= List of Brooklyn Law School alumni =

The following list shows notable Brooklyn Law School alumni:

== Academia ==
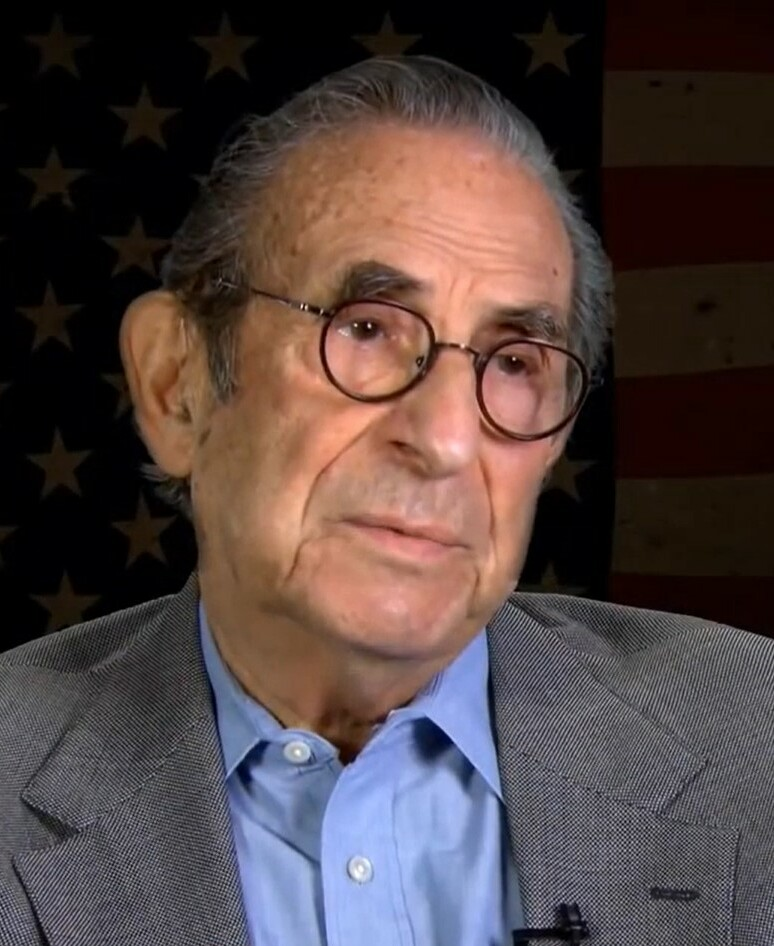
I. Leo Glasser

- Vincent Martin Bonventre, 1976, Justice Robert H. Jackson Distinguished Professor at Albany Law School
- William B. Carswell, 1908, Dean of Brooklyn Law School; New York (NY) State Senator, and Associate Justice of the NY Supreme Court, Appellate Division.
- I. Leo Glasser, 1948, Dean of Brooklyn Law School; Judge on the U.S. District Court for the Eastern District of New York.
- Daniel Gutman, 1922, Dean of New York Law School, NY State Senator, and NY State Assemblyman.
- Jerome Prince, 1933, Dean of Brooklyn Law School; evidence scholar and author of Prince on Evidence.
- Harold Rosenberg, 1927, professor of Social Thought in the Art Department at the University of Chicago
- Patricia Schiller (born Pearl Silverman), 1934, professor of Obstetrics and Gynecology at Howard University College of Medicine
- Edward V. Sparer, 1959, professor at Yale Law School and University of Pennsylvania Law School; founded Mobilization for Justice and considered the "father of welfare law."
- Stephen Teret, 1969, professor of Health Policy and Management, and Associate Dean, at the Johns Hopkins Bloomberg School of Public Health

== Business ==
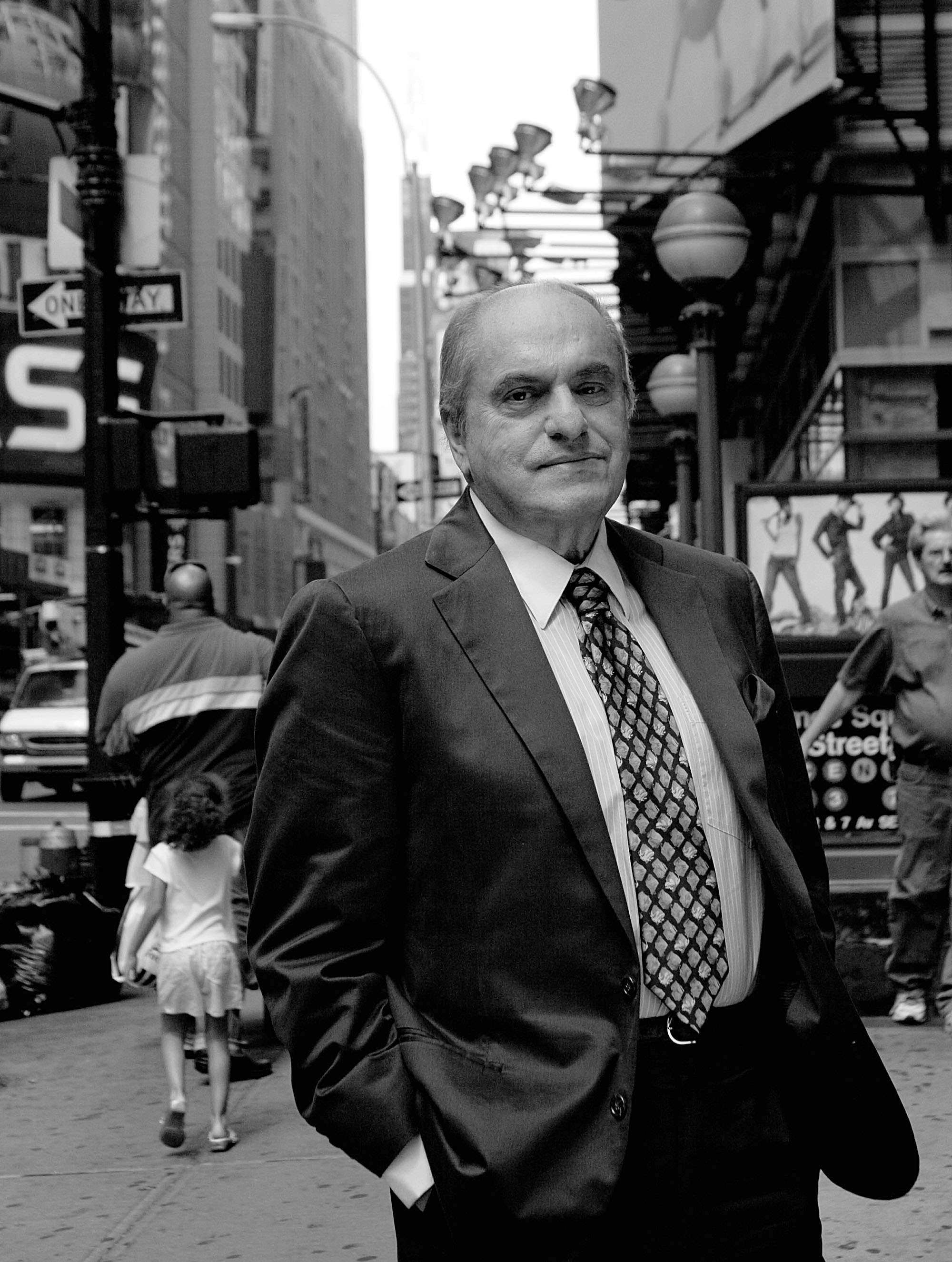
Leon Charney

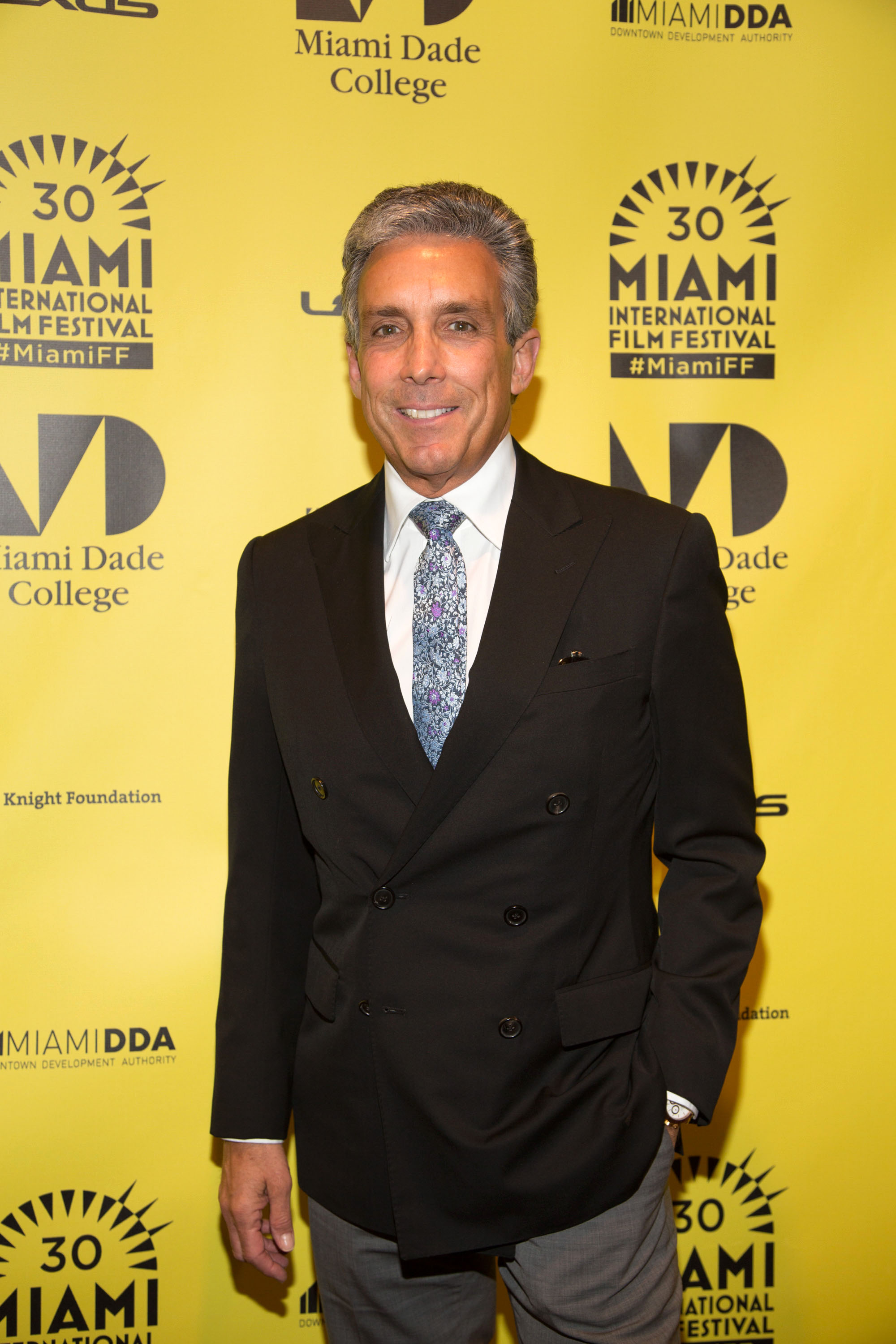
Charles S. Cohen

- William F. Aldinger III, 1975, CEO of HSBC Finance Corporation and Capmark (now Ally Financial).
- Leon Charney, 1964, real estate tycoon and billionaire.
- Charles S. Cohen, 1977, CEO of Cohen Brothers Realty Corporation and billionaire.
- Milton Cooper, 1953, CEO of Kimco Realty Corporation.
- Jeffrey Feil, 1973, real estate developer and CEO of The Feil Organization.
- Noah J. Hanft, 1976, General Counsel, MasterCard International.
- Lon Jacobs, 1981, Chief Legal Officer, Senior Executive Vice President, and Group General Counsel of News Corporation.
- Alfred J. Koeppel 1957, New York real estate developer
- Marvin Kratter, 1939, real estate investor, head of the Boston Celtics.
- Nat Lefkowitz, co-chairman of the William Morris Agency
- Bernie Madoff, class of 1963 (left after first year), financial fraudster
- Fred Rosen, former CEO of Ticketmaster, co-founder of the Bel Air Homeowners Alliance.
- George H. Ross, 1953, Executive Vice President and Senior Counsel, Trump Organization; appeared on two seasons of The Apprentice.
- Barry Salzberg, 1977, CEO of Deloitte & Touche.
- Larry Silverstein, 1955, billionaire real estate investor and developer; owns and is developing the World Trade Center complex in Lower Manhattan.
- Stuart Subotnick, 1968, partner and Chief Operating Officer, Metromedia; one of 400 wealthiest people in the US; chairman, Brooklyn Law School Board of Trustees.
- Joel Wiener, 1974, CEO of Pinnacle Group, real estate developer and billionaire.

== Government ==
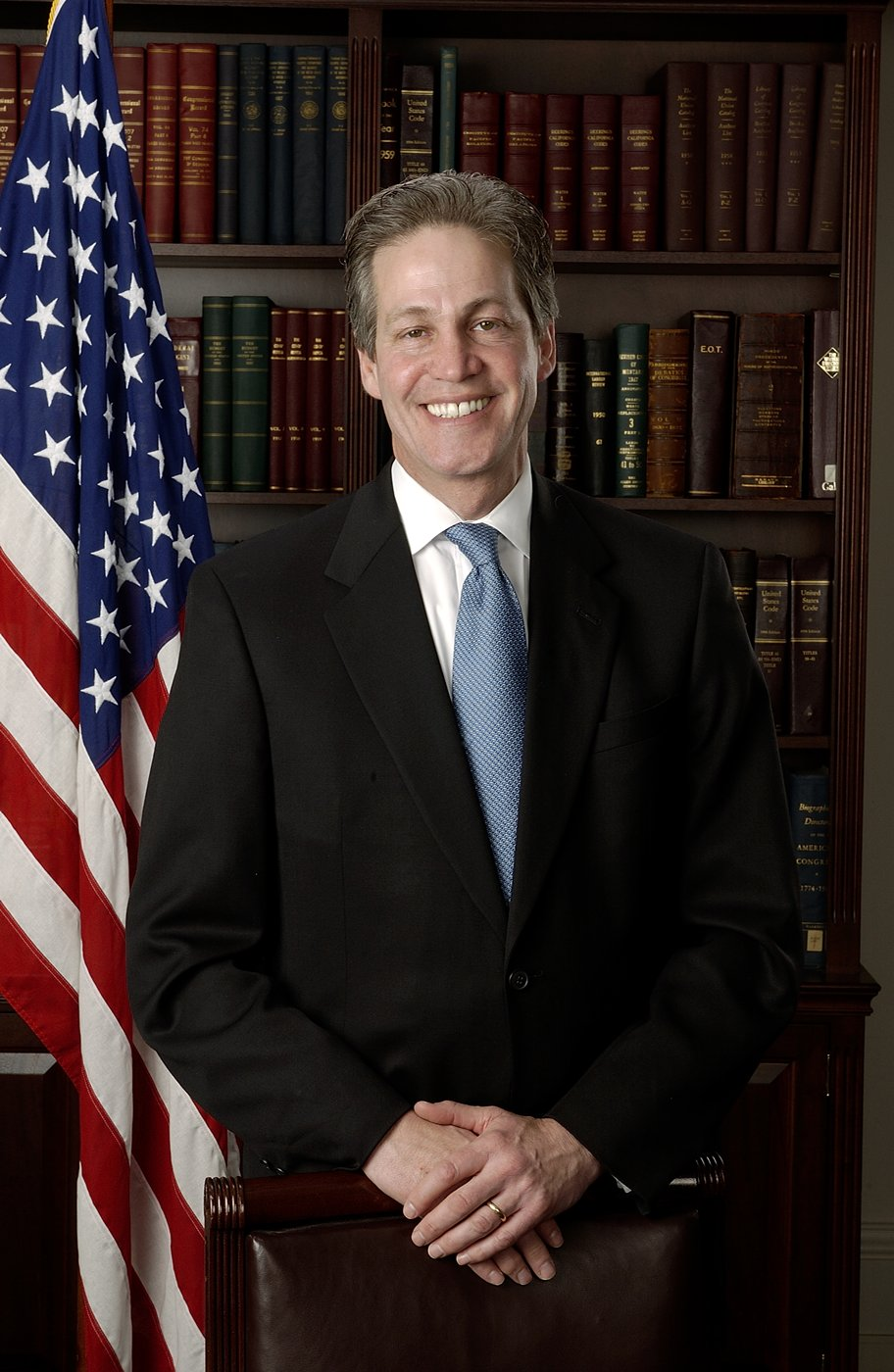
Senator Norm Coleman

- Victor Anfuso, 1927, Democratic Member of the U.S. House of Representatives from New York (NY), 8th Congressional District.
- Herman Badillo, 1954, Democratic Member of the U.S. House of Representatives from NY, 21st and 22nd Districts; Bronx Borough President. First Puerto Rican elected to these posts (outside of Puerto Rico).
- John J. Bennett Jr., 1923, NY State Attorney General (Democrat)
- Abraham Bernstein, 1941, NY State Senator (Democrat)
- Todd Blanche, 2003, United States Attorney General (Republican)
- Frank J. Brasco, 1957, Democratic Member of the U.S. House of Representatives from NY, 11th District.
- James F. Brennan, 1982, NY State Assemblyman, 44th District (Democrat)
- John D. Clarke, 1911, Republican Member of the U.S. House of Representatives from NY, 34th District.
- Sol Chaikin, 1940, President of the International Ladies Garment Workers Union
- Norm Coleman, attended 1972–'74, U.S. Senator from Minnesota, Mayor of Saint Paul, Minnesota (1994–2002).
- Steven Cymbrowitz, 1990, NY State Assemblyman, 45th District (Democrat).
- John J. Delaney, 1927, Democratic Member of the U.S. House of Representatives from NY, 7th District.

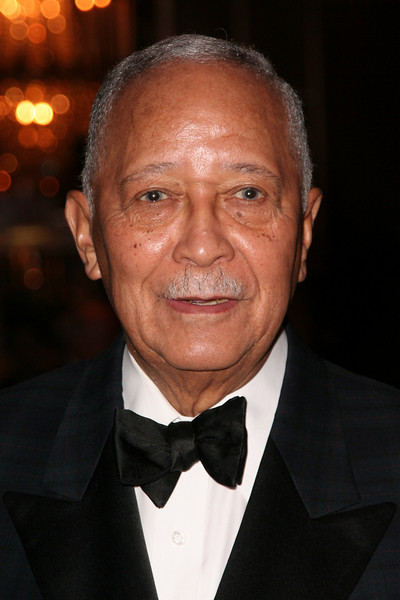
Mayor David Dinkins

- David Dinkins, 1956, Mayor of New York City (1990–93); first African American to hold that office (Democrat).
- Jeffrey Dinowitz, 1979, NY State Assemblyman, 81st District (Democrat).
- Morris M. Edelstein, 1909, Democratic Member of the U.S. House of Representatives from NY, 14th District.
- James H. Fay, 1929, Democratic Member of the U.S. House of Representatives from NY, 16th District.
- Joseph V. Flynn, 1906, Democratic Member of the U.S. House of Representatives from NY, 3rd District.
- Leonard Garment, 1949, acting special counsel to U.S. President Richard Nixon, and 2005 National Medal of Arts recipient.
- Howard Golden, 1958, Brooklyn Borough President (Democrat)
- Frieda B. Hennock, 1924, first woman Federal Communications Commission Commissioner.
- Edward Jurith, 1976, acting director of the Office of National Drug Control Policy
- Howard L. Lasher, 1968, Democratic NY State Assemblyman, 46th and 47th Districts. First Orthodox Jew elected to state office in NY State.
- Henry J. Latham, 1931, Republican Member of the U.S. House of Representatives from NY, 3rd and 4th Districts.
- Norman J. Levy, 1958, NY State Senator (Republican)
- John Marchi, 1953, NY State Senator (Republican)
- Christopher Mega, 1953, NY State Senator, Assemblyman, and judge (Republican).
- George M. Michaels, 1933, NY State Assemblyman (Democrat).
- Abraham J. Multer, 1922, Democratic Member of the U.S. House of Representatives from NY, 13th and 14th Districts.
- Thomas V. Ognibene, 1974, Republican member of the New York City Council, 30th District; held the position of Council minority leader.
- E. Jean Nelson Penfield (1872-1961), co-founder, League of Women Voters; National President, Kappa Kappa Gamma
- Rafael Piñeiro, 1980, New York City First Deputy Police Commissioner.
- Robert Plunkett 2006, member of the Vermont Senate
- Bertram L. Podell, 1949, Democratic Member of the U.S. House of Representatives from NY, 13th District.
- David M. Potts, 1926, 1933, Republican Member of the U.S. House of Representatives from NY, 26th District.
- Morton Povman, 1955, Democratic New York City Council Member
- John J. Robinson, 1909, NY State Assemblyman (Democrat)
- Benjamin S. Rosenthal, 1949, Democratic Member of the U.S. House of Representatives from NY 6th, 7th, and 8th Districts.
- Sean M. Ryan, 1992, NY State Assemblyman (Democrat)
- Irving H. Saypol, 1927, United States Attorney for the Southern District of New York
- Nicholas Scoppetta, 1962, 31st New York City Fire Commissioner and first Commissioner of the Administration for Children's Services.
- Sheldon Silver, 1968, Democratic Speaker of the New York State Assembly (1994–present), the second-longest speakership in NY State history.
- Leonard Silverman, 1954, five-term NY State Assemblyman, former Chairman of the Committee on Insurance, and Judge for the NY State Court of Claims.
- Herbert J. Simins, 1958, New York City Commissioner of Public Works, Nassau County Commissioner of Public Works.
- Lawrence J. Smith, 1964, Democratic Member of the U.S. House of Representatives from Florida, 16th District.
- Percy Sutton, 1950, first African-American Manhattan Borough President, civil rights activist, founder of Inner City Broadcasting Corporation.
- Edward Thompson, 1936, New York City Fire Commissioner
- Lester D. Volk, 1911, Republican Member of the U.S. House of Representatives from NY, 10th District.
- Benjamin Ward, 1965, New York City Police Commissioner.
- Ivan Warner, 1955, NY State Senator (Democrat)
- Mark Weprin, 1992, NY State Assemblyman, 24th District (Democrat).
- Saul Weprin, 1951, Democratic Speaker of the NY State Assembly (1991–94).
- Paul Windels, 1909, Corporation Counsel of New York City (1934–37)

== Judges ==
=== U.S. Court of Appeals ===
- Frank Altimari, 1951, Judge on the U.S. Court of Appeals for the Second Circuit

=== U.S. District Court ===
- Matthew T. Abruzzo, 1910, Judge for the U.S. District Court for the Eastern District of NY
- Henry Bramwell, 1948, first African-American Judge appointed to the U.S. District Court for the Eastern District of NY.
- Mark Americus Costantino, 1947, Judge for the U.S. District Court for the Eastern District of NY.
- I. Leo Glasser, (see Academia above)
- Sterling Johnson Jr., 1966, Senior Judge of the U.S. District Court for the Eastern District of NY.
- Harold Maurice Kennedy, 1925, Judge of the U.S. District Court for the Eastern District of NY.
- Edward R. Korman, 1966, Chief Judge of the U.S. District Court for the Eastern District of NY.
- Shirley Wohl Kram, 1950, Judge for the U.S. District Court for the Southern District of NY.
- Mary Johnson Lowe, 1954, Judge for the U.S. District Court for the Southern District of NY.
- Ramon E. Reyes Jr., 1992, Judge for the U.S. District Court for the Eastern District of New York.
- Nelson Roman, 1989, Judge for the U.S. District Court for the Southern District of NY.
- George Rosling, 1923, Judge for the U.S. District Court for the Eastern District of NY.
- Sparkle L. Sooknanan, 2010, Judge on the U.S. District Court for the District of Columbia.
- Arthur Donald Spatt, 1949, Judge on the U.S. District Court for the Eastern District of NY.
- Jennifer P. Wilson, 2001, Judge for the U.S. District Court for the Middle District of Pennsylvania.
- Stephen Victor Wilson, 1967, Judge on the U.S. District Court for the Central District of California.

=== U.S. Court of International Trade ===
- Claire R. Kelly, 1993, Judge of the U.S. Court of International Trade
- James Lopez Watson, 1951, Judge of the U.S. Court of International Trade.

=== U.S. Customs Court ===
- Webster Oliver, 1911, Chief Judge of the U.S. Customs Court

=== State ===
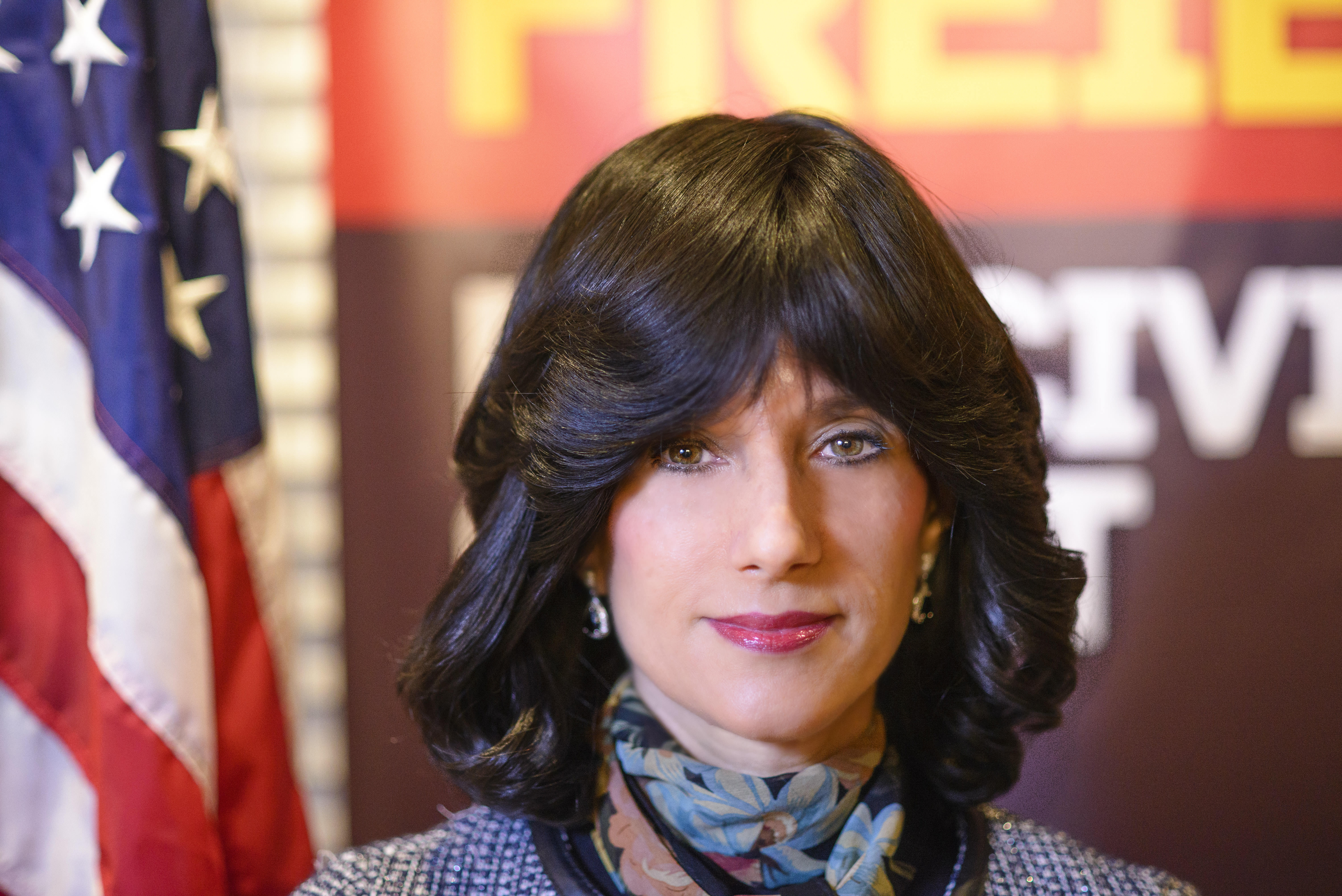
Judge Rachel Freier

- Harold Birns, 1938, Associate Justice of the NY Appellate Division, First Department
- Bernard Botein, 1924, Presiding Justice of the NY State Supreme Court, Appellate Division, First Department, and President of the New York City Bar Association.
- Dorothy Chin Brandt, 1974, first descendant of a Chinese immigrant to win elective office in New York State, also the state’s first female jurist of Asian heritage, served in Civil Court in Manhattan, Brooklyn and Queens; in Criminal Court in Queens; and, from 1991 to 1992 and 2001 to 2016, as an acting New York State Supreme Court justice.
- Jeanette Goodman Brill, 1908, first woman Magistrate in Brooklyn
- John Carro, 1956, Associate Justice of the NY Appellate Division, First Department, first Puerto Rican to be designated an Appellate Court Justice, and founding partner of the largest Latino-owned law firm in New York.
- Noach Dear, 1991, New York Supreme Court judge
- Steven W. Fisher, 1972, Associate Justice of the NY Appellate Division, Second Department
- Rachel Freier, 2005, Civil Court judge for the Kings County 5th judicial district in NY State, first Hasidic Jewish woman to be elected as a civil court judge in NY State, and first Hasidic woman to serve in public office in US history.
- Julius J. Gans, 1919, member of the New York State Assembly and New York Supreme Court Justice
- E. Leo Milonas, 1960, partner of Pillsbury Winthrop Shaw Pittman LLP; former Associate Justice, Associate Justice of the NY Appellate Division, First Department, and Chief Administrative Judge of the State of NY.
- Frank D. O'Connor, 1934, Judge of the Appellate Division of the NY State Supreme Court, Queens District Attorney, President of the New York City Council.
- Ann Pfau, 1984, Chief Administrative Judge of the NY State Unified Court System.
- Raja Rajeswari, 1998, Judge of the Criminal Court of NYC, first India-born woman to be appointed a judge in New York City
- Rosalyn Richter, 1979, Associate Justice of the NY Appellate Division of the Supreme Court, First Department
- E. Ivan Rubenstein, 1917, Justice of the New York Supreme Court
- Irma Vidal Santaella, 1961, 1967, justice of the NY State Supreme Court, first Puerto Rican woman admitted to the NY State Bar and first Puerto Rican woman to be elected to the NY State Supreme Court.
- Benjamin F. Schreiber, 1905, justice of the New York Supreme Court
- Brian P. Stern, 1991, associate justice of the Rhode Island Superior Court
- William C. Thompson, 1954, justice of the NY State Supreme Court, Appellate Division, Second Department; founding member of nation's first community development corporation, Bedford Stuyvesant Restoration Corporation.
- Peter Tom, 1975, first Asian-American appellate justice in NY State
- Edwin Torres, 1957, NY State Supreme Court justice and best-selling author of crime novels.
- Moses M. Weinstein, 1934, justice of the NY Supreme Court, Appellate Division, Second Department, and Acting Speaker of the NY State Assembly.

== Media and entertainment ==
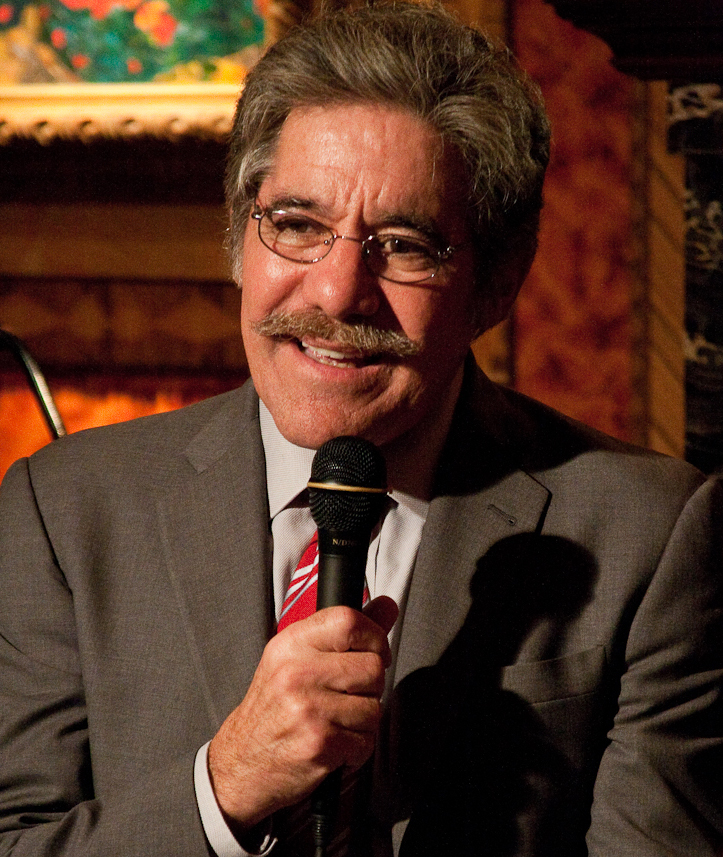
Geraldo Rivera

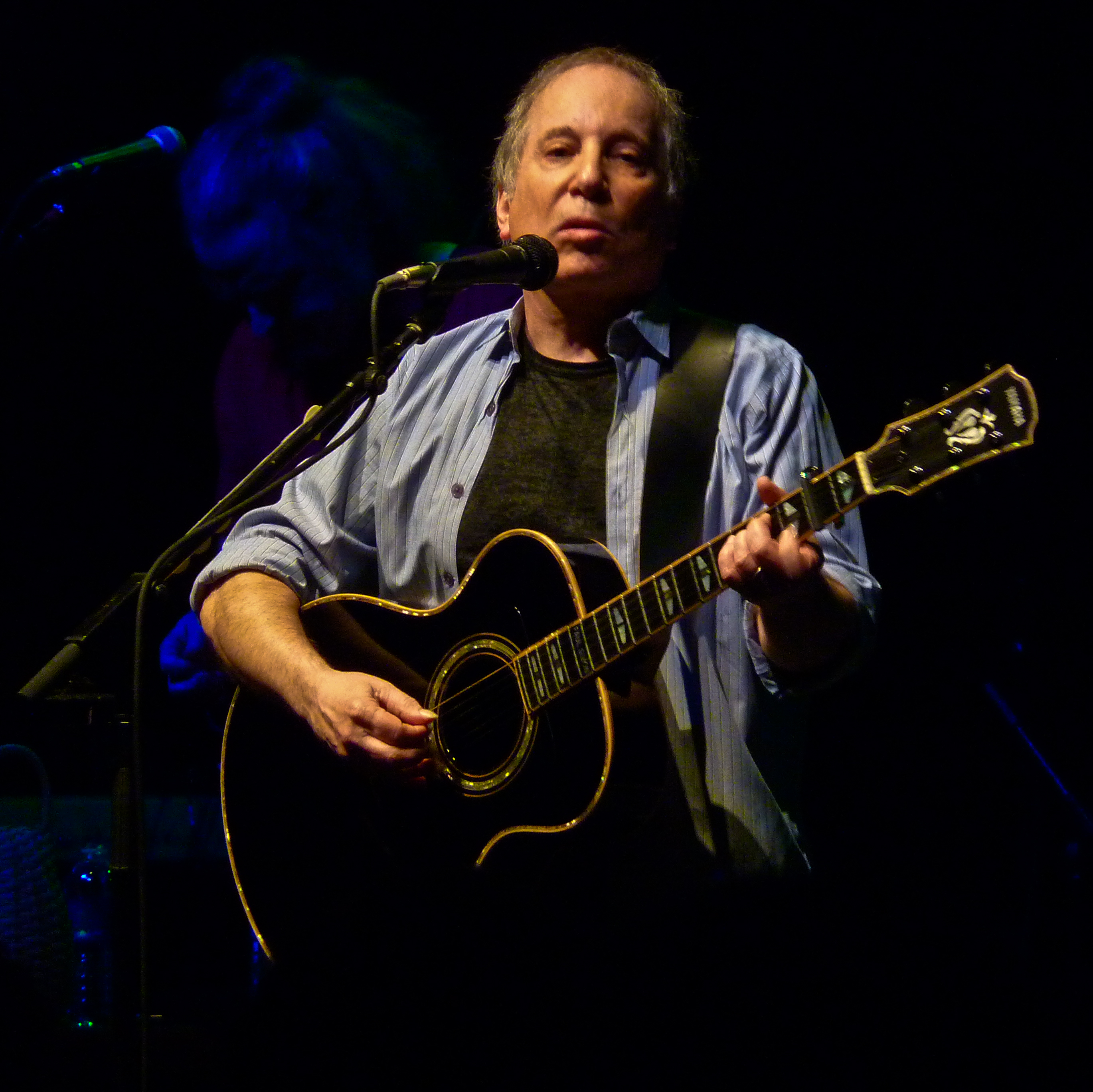
Paul Simon

- Marty Bandier, 1965, CEO of Sony/ATV Music Publishing.
- Himan Brown, 1931, producer of radio programs, member of the Radio Hall of Fame and recipient of the Peabody Award
- Sergio De La Pava, novelist
- Joey Fallon, child actor of television, theater, radio and film, portrayed the kidnap victim in "Fearful Decision" and Tom Sawyer to Eileen Heckart's Aunt Polly in an episode of Campbell Television Playhouse
- Irving Fein, 1936, Emmy Award-winning TV and film producer, and manager of Jack Benny and George Burns.
- Kevin Heffernan, actor, writer, producer, and director
- Irving "Swifty" Lazar, 1931, talent agent and deal-maker. Dubbed "Swifty" by Humphrey Bogart when he put together three major deals for Bogart in a single day.
- Errol Louis, 2005, journalist and television show host
- Russell T. Lewis, 1973, CEO of The New York Times Company.
- Kalman Magyar, Hungarian folk musician and lawyer.
- Bill Mantlo, 1987, comic book writer.
- Bruce Ricker, 1970, jazz and blues documentarian
- Geraldo Rivera, 1969, host of the newsmagazine program Geraldo at Large; appears regularly on Fox News Channel.
- Paul Simon, 1963 (attended), 12-Grammy Award-winning musician, songwriter, and producer.
- Brian Sullivan, 2003, television news anchor and business journalist.
- Hy Zaret, 1930s, lyricist and composer; co-author of 1955 hit "Unchained Melody."

== Private practice ==
- Frank J. Aquila, 1983, corporate lawyer at Sullivan & Cromwell.
- Mark M. Baker, 1972, criminal defense attorney
- Melvin Block, 1950, (deceased) former trial lawyer from New York City
- Bruce Cutler, 1974, and Gerald Shargel, 1969, (deceased) criminal defense lawyers known for defending high-profile defendants including John Gotti
- Julia V. Grilli, 1914, (deceased) former suffragist, formerly active with the Italian Welfare League
- Allen Grubman, 1967, entertainment lawyer.
- Leonard Grunstein, 1975, finance executive, retired lawyer, and philanthropist.
- Alfred S. Julien, (deceased) founding partner, Julien & Schlesinger, P.C.
- Robert M. Kaufman, 1957, (deceased) partner at Proskauer Rose, and President of the New York City Bar Association.
- Gerald B. Lefcourt, 1967, criminal defense lawyer.
- Richard Raysman, 1973, founding member of Thelen Reid Brown Raysman & Steiner
- Gerald Shargel, 1969, criminal defense lawyer; Practitioner-in-Residence at Brooklyn Law School.

== Sports ==
- Nikki Dryden, 2005, Olympic swimmer, 3-time Pan Am Games silver medal winner, 3-time World Cup gold medal winner
- Jeffrey B. Gewirtz, 1994, Senior Vice President & General Counsel, New Jersey Nets
- Timothy Kelly, 2005, former General Manager for the Long Island Lizards of Major League Lacrosse; current General Manager of the New York Titans of the National Lacrosse League.
- Don Kennedy, paralympic athlete, weightlifter and wheelchair basketball player
- Yuliya Levitan, 2006, a Woman International Master in chess
- Chris Massey, 2004, attackman who played professional field lacrosse in Major League Lacrosse
- Pete Spanakos, bantamweight boxer who won a bronze medal at the 1959 Pan American Games
- Lonn A. Trost, 1971, Chief Operating Officer & General Counsel, New York Yankees.

== Other ==
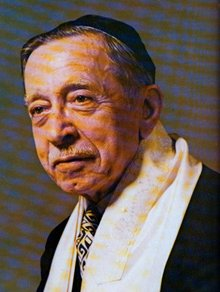
Rabbi Harry Halpern

- Charles Abrams, 1922, urbanist and housing expert
- Randall Amster, 1991, author, activist, and educator
- Alejandra Caraballo, 2016, civil rights attorney and clinical instructor at the Harvard Law School Cyberlaw Clinic.
- Morton J. Gold, 1949, US Air Force Brigadier General
- Harry Halpern, 1926, prominent Conservative rabbi
- Rosalie Gardiner Jones, 1919, socialite and suffragist.
- Alexander Lowen, 1936, physician and psychotherapist
- Mickey Marcus, 1934, Colonel in the U.S. Army, first General of the Israeli Army
- Monique Mehta, 2006, humanitarian and political activist
- Robert Rosenthal, 1941, decorated Jewish USAF B-17 commander flew 53 missions, despite shot down twice; later assisted U.S. prosecutor at Nuremberg
