= Grilli =

Grilli is a surname. Notable people with the surname include:

- Francesca Grilli (born 1978), Italian visual artist
- Guido Grilli (born 1939), American baseball relief pitcher
- Jason Grilli (born 1976), American baseball relief pitcher
- Julia V. Grilli (1893–1991), American lawyer and concert singer
- Paolo Grilli (1857–1952), Italian sculptor and painter
- Rodrigo-Antonio Grilli (born 1979), Brazilian tennis player
- Steve Grilli (born 1949), American baseball pitcher, father of Jason
- Vittorio Grilli (born 1957), Italian economist and academic

== See also ==
- Grilli, Gavorrano, village in Tuscany
