= Jack Molinas =

American basketball player (1931–1975)

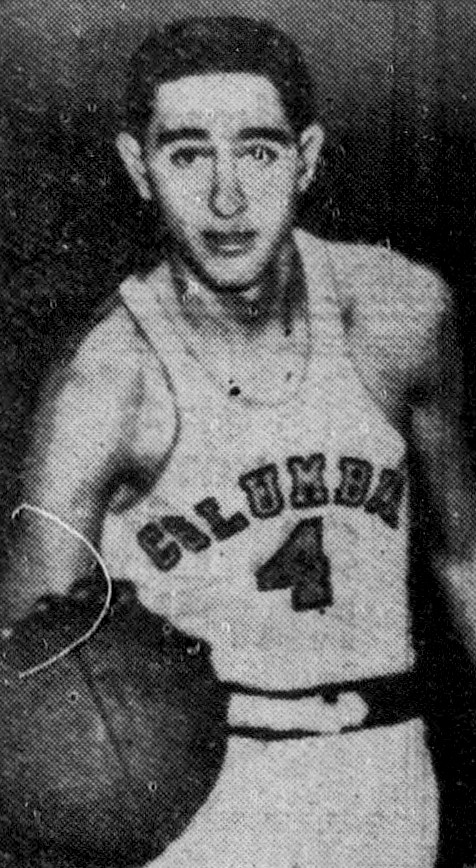
- Molinas, circa 1951

Personal information
- Born: October 31, 1931 New York City, New York, U.S.
- Died: August 3, 1975 (aged 43) Hollywood, California, U.S.
- Listed height: 6 ft 6 in (1.98 m)
- Listed weight: 200 lb (91 kg)

Career information
- High school: Stuyvesant (New York City, New York)
- College: Columbia (1950–1953)
- NBA draft: 1953: 1st round, 3rd overall pick
- Drafted by: Fort Wayne Pistons
- Playing career: 1953–1962
- Position: Small forward / power forward
- Number: 6
- Coaching career: 1960–1961

Career history

Playing
- 1953–1954: Fort Wayne Pistons
- 1954–1959: Williamsport Billies
- 1960–1961: Hazleton Hawks
- 1961–1962: Wilkes-Barre Barons

Coaching
- 1960–1961: Hazleton Hawks

Career highlights
- NBA All-Star (1954); EPBL Most Valuable Player (1956); 5× All-EPBL First Team (1955–1958, 1960); 2× All-EPBL Second Team (1959, 1961)

Career NBA statistics
- Points: 370 (11.6 ppg)
- Rebounds: 228 (7.1 rpg)
- Assists: 51 (1.6 apg)
- Stats at NBA.com
- Stats at Basketball Reference

Jacob Louis Molinas (October 31, 1931 – August 3, 1975) was an American professional basketball player, playing first for Columbia University in New York City, and later briefly in the early National Basketball Association (NBA) with the Fort Wayne Pistons. He also played for multiple minor league teams after his brief NBA stint (mostly in Pennsylvania, although he would play in the summer leagues, sometimes with other players that had controversial pasts as well) during the 1950s and early 1960s. During that period of time, he supposedly became an associate of the Genovese crime family due to his association with a couple of people there, and he later became a key figure in one of the most wide-reaching point shaving cheating scandals in college basketball history.

== Early life ==
Molinas grew up in Brooklyn and attended the then all-boys premier academic selective specialized Stuyvesant High School in Manhattan of New York City. His parents owned a bar on Coney Island, the ocean-side resort in Brooklyn. Molinas notably was among a part of the crowd of people to see his hometown New York Knicks in their first ever home game at the Madison Square Garden against the Chicago Stags in the Basketball Association of America on November 11, 1946 (with Molinas sitting at Section 325 during that night's game) due to him being among a group of students that were from the Bronx High School of Science that he would sometimes hang out with. That game not only was a game where he could see himself competing against the rest of the competition in that league (which would later be rebranded into the National Basketball Association), but also continue seeing him getting involved with the world of gambling after he previously met up with Joe Hacken (who would later be a long-time associate of his) at the young age of 12 years old.

== College career ==
He attended Columbia University from 1950 to 1953 where he played basketball. In the 1952–1953 season he was the captain of Columbia's team and led the team in scoring. In 1953, he set a team record for most points scored in a game—a mark that was eclipsed a few years later by Chet Forte. During his time in Columbia, he was measured to have a genius-level I.Q. of 175. He also had some involvement in the 1951 college basketball point-shaving scandal back when he played college basketball, though he was never caught while he played for Columbia.

== Professional career ==
The Fort Wayne Pistons drafted him third in the 1953 NBA draft. He played in 32 games before the league banned him for wagering on Pistons games. Molinas was selected for the 1954 NBA All-Star Game, but was suspended at the time of the game and was replaced by teammate Andy Phillip. He later sued the NBA for $3 million, claiming the league's ban was an unreasonable restraint of trade. Judge Irving Kaufman ruled against him in the case. Molinas would be the last active player to be banned from the NBA for gambling until 2024, 70 years later, when Jontay Porter was banned from the NBA for his own involvement in gambling on NBA games in which he played.

Molinas played in the Eastern Professional Basketball League (EPBL) from 1954 to 1962 for the Williamsport Billies, Hazleton Hawks and Wilkes-Barre Barons. He was selected as the EPBL Most Valuable Player in 1956. Molinas was a five-time All-EPBL First Team selection (1955–1958, 1960) and two-time Second Team selection (1959, 1961). He served as a player-coach for the Hawks during the 1960–61 season. After his playing career was nearing its end, he entered the Brooklyn Law School, graduating with a law degree. Before his admission to law school, the Bronx County District Attorney investigated his case and concluded that he had not committed a crime. The bar association also reviewed his case and admitted him to the New York Bar.

== Point-shaving scandal ==
Molinas became the central figure in the 1961 point-shaving scandal. The gambling ring went on from 1957 to 1960 and involved 50 players from 27 colleges. Two of the most notable players ensnared in the scandal were future Hall of Famers Connie Hawkins and Roger Brown. Molinas gave Hawkins $250 during his first year at Iowa but never encouraged him to throw games. Although Molinas never implicated Hawkins in any way, both Hawkins and Brown were effectively blackballed from both collegiate and professional basketball until signing with the upstart American Basketball Association (ABA) in 1967. Hawkins also played in the American Basketball League (ABL) for its entire existence (1961–63), and filed a lawsuit against the NBA in 1967 with the objective of being admitted to the league; the lawsuit was settled and Hawkins signed in 1969 with the Phoenix Suns. Meanwhile, Brown spent his entire professional career in the rival ABA, leading the Indiana Pacers to three ABA titles before retiring from basketball in 1975; the Pacers retired his number (No. 35) on November 2, 1985. In 1963, Molinas was convicted for his role in the scheme and was sentenced to 10 to 15 years in prison. He was paroled in 1968 after serving five years. Molinas was said to have contacts with New York City mobsters Thomas Eboli and Vincent Gigante. According to Molinas' attorney in the case, Jacob Evseroff, it was possible that he could have won his case had he taken the stand on his own behalf, yet he failed to do so since he notably lost his nerve (the only time he had done so during the case) in relation to members of organized crime and sports gambling.

== Later life ==
Molinas moved to Los Angeles in 1970. After unsuccessfully negotiating with film producers to have his life portrayed in a motion picture, he began writing an autobiography.

In 1973, authorities arrested and charged him with interstate shipment of pornography and furs in Taiwan, and he was scheduled to stand trial on those charges at the time of his death.

== Death ==
At 2:00 am on August 3, 1975, at age 43, Molinas was shot and killed while standing in the backyard of his home in Los Angeles. Molinas was hit in the neck, and his girlfriend and dog were both wounded as well. Police did not rule out a mob-related murder. His business partner had been beaten to death in November 1974.

== Career statistics ==
Legend
GP	Games played	GS	Games started	MPG	Minutes per game
FG%	Field goal percentage	3P%	3-point field goal percentage	FT%	Free throw percentage
RPG	Rebounds per game	APG	Assists per game	SPG	Steals per game
BPG	Blocks per game	PPG	Points per game	**Bold**	Career high

=== NBA regular season ===
Year	Team	GP	MPG	FG%	FT%	RPG	APG	PPG
1953–54	Fort Wayne	32	29.9	.390	.759	7.1	1.6	11.6
Career		32	29.9	.390	.759	7.1	1.6	11.6

=== EPBL regular season ===
Year	Team	GP	MPG	FG%	FT%	RPG	APG	PPG
1954–55	Williamsport	28						22.7
1955–56	Williamsport	26						27.3
1956–57	Williamsport	29						26.5
1957–58	Williamsport	26						32.2
1958–59	Williamsport	19						26.1
1958–59	Williamsport	19						26.1
1959–60	Williamsport-Hazleton	22			66.8	7.4	3.6	25.0
1960–61	Hazleton	22			77.9	9.5	2.6	30.0
1961–62	Wilkes-Barre	7			69.8	4.4	2.9	17.7
Career		157						27.0

== See also ==
- List of Stuyvesant High School people
- List of Columbia University alumni and attendees
- List of Brooklyn Law School alumni
- List of people banned or suspended by the NBA
- 1951 college basketball point-shaving scandal
- 1953–54 Fort Wayne Pistons season
- 1961 NCAA University Division men's basketball gambling scandal
- Connie Hawkins
- Roger Brown
- Jontay Porter
- 2025 NBA illegal gambling prosecution
