= Ron Galella =

American photographer (1931–2022)

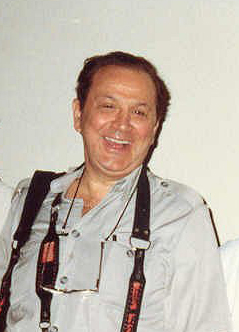
- Galella at the 60th Academy Awards, 1988
- Born: Ronald Edward Galella; January 10, 1931; New York City, New York, U.S.
- Died: April 30, 2022 (aged 91); Montville, New Jersey, U.S.
- Other name: Paparazzo Extraordinaire
- Occupation: Celebrity photographer
- Spouse: Betty Lou Burke (m. 1979; died 2017)
- Website: rongalella.com

Ronald Edward Galella (January 10, 1931 – April 30, 2022) was an American photographer, known as a pioneer paparazzo. Dubbed "Paparazzo Extraordinaire" by Newsweek and "the Godfather of the U.S. paparazzi culture" by Time magazine and Vanity Fair, he is regarded by Harper's Bazaar as "arguably the most controversial paparazzo of all time". He photographed many celebrities out of the public eye and gained notice for his feuds with some of them, including Jacqueline Onassis and Marlon Brando. Despite the numerous controversies and claims of stalking, Galella's work was praised and exhibited in art galleries worldwide.

During his career, Galella took more than three million photographs of public figures.

== Early life ==
Galella was born in New York City on January 10, 1931, in a family of Italian heritage. His father, Vincenzo, was an immigrant from Muro Lucano, Basilicata, who manufactured pianos and coffins; his mother, Michelina (Marinaccio), was born in New Jersey to immigrants from Benevento, Campania, and worked as a crochet beader. After graduating high school, he won a two-year scholarship at the Pratt Institute in Brooklyn but turned it down due to his deficiencies in mathematics.

Galella served as a United States Air Force photographer from 1951 to 1955, including during the Korean War. He later attended the Art Center College of Design in Pasadena, California, graduating with a degree in photojournalism in 1958. In his free time, Galella took pictures of the stars arriving at film premieres, selling them to magazines like National Enquirer and Photoplay. He soon became known for his photographic approach, portraying famous people out of the spotlight, usually in spontaneous expressions.

== Career ==
Galella's photographs have been featured in hundreds of publications including Time, Harper's Bazaar, Vogue, Vanity Fair, People, Rolling Stone, The New Yorker, The New York Times, and Life. In his in-home darkroom, Galella made his own prints which have been exhibited at museums and galleries throughout the world, including the MoMA in New York City, San Francisco Museum of Modern Art, the Tate Modern in London, and the Helmut Newton Foundation Museum of Photography in Berlin.

In 2009, his father's hometown of Muro Lucano made Galella an honorary citizen. He was the subject of a 2010 documentary film by Leon Gast entitled Smash His Camera. The film's title is a quote from Jacqueline Kennedy Onassis directed to her security agent after Galella pursued her and her children through Central Park, New York. The documentary premiered at the 2010 Sundance Film Festival, winning the Grand Jury Award for Directing in the U.S. Documentary category. It also received positive reviews at the 54th BFI London Film Festival before it aired on the BBC.

== Controversies ==
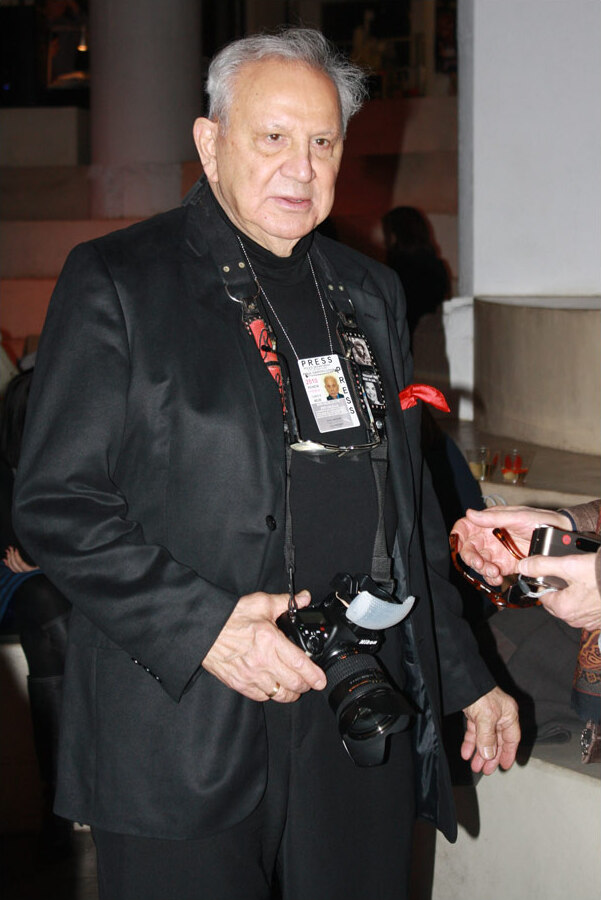
Galella in 2010

Galella was known for his obsessive picture taking of Jacqueline Onassis and the subsequent legal battles associated with it. The New York Post called it "the most co-dependent celeb-pap[arazzo] relationship ever". The 1972 free-speech trial Galella v. Onassis resulted in a restraining order to keep Galella 50 yards (later changed to 25 feet) away from Onassis. He was found guilty of breaking this order four times and faced seven years in jail and a $120,000 fine; later settling for a $10,000 fine and surrendering his rights to photograph Jackie and her children.

On June 12, 1973, actor Marlon Brando punched Galella in the face outside a restaurant in Chinatown in New York City, breaking the photographer's jaw and knocking out five of his teeth on the left side of his mouth. Galella had been following Brando, who was accompanied by Dick Cavett, to the restaurant after a taping of The Dick Cavett Show earlier that day. Galella hired lawyers Stuart Schlesinger and Alfred Julien to sue Brando and ultimately settled for US$40,000. Schlesinger reported in the 2010 documentary Smash His Camera that Galella received two-thirds, but only cared about getting the message out, "I don't want anyone to think they can go around punching me if I am taking their picture. Get that story out, not the money." The next time Galella chased Brando, he wore a football helmet.

Galella once lost a tooth when he was beaten by Richard Burton's security guards. He unsuccessfully sued the actor. Elizabeth Taylor, who tended to be tolerant towards photographers, was often heard to mutter, "I'm going to kill Ron Galella!", although the actress would later use his photographs in her biography. Galella's other targets included Elvis Presley, whose bodyguards slashed his tires, Brigitte Bardot, whose security staff hosed him down, the restaurateur Elaine Kaufman of Elaine's who once threw a trashcan lid at his head, and Sean Penn, who spat at him and reportedly punched him while being photographed with his then-wife Madonna.

In spite of these controversies, art galleries across the world have valued his work for its artistic and socio-historical value. He was praised by Andy Warhol, who said: "My idea of a good picture is one that's in focus and of a famous person doing something unfamous. It's being in the right place at the wrong time. That's why my favorite photographer is Ron Galella." Art writer Glenn O'Brien defined him as a "brilliant realist able to represent the world faithfully." One of Galella's pictures depicting Jacqueline Onassis, dubbed Windblown Jackie, was included among "The Most Influential Images of All Time" by Time magazine in 2016.

== Personal life ==
Galella married Betty Lou Burke in 1979. She worked as a photo editor for Today Is Sunday, and was subsequently his business partner. They remained married until her death on January 9, 2017, at the age of 68. Speaking of his wife, Galella said, "When Betty first purchased my photos for publication and granted me assignment credentials over the phone, I fell in love with her warm soft, loving voice. I met her in person for the first time, two years later, on Dec. 10, 1978, at the Kennedy Center for the premiere of Superman. With one look at that beautiful girl, I said, 'I'm gonna marry you.' And five months later, we were. Once married, we became a team."

After retiring as a paparazzo, Galella was active as a photographer at prominent culture events. He resided in Montville, New Jersey, during his later years.

Galella died on April 30, 2022, at his home in Montville, New Jersey. He was 91, and suffered from congestive heart failure prior to his death.

== Publications ==
- Jacqueline. 1974, Sheed and Ward. ISBN 978-0-8362-0573-2.
- Offguard: A Paparazzi Look at the Beautiful People. 1976, McGraw-Hill. ISBN 978-0-07-022733-0.
- The Photographs of Ron Galella: 1965–1989. 2001, Greybull. ISBN 978-0-9672366-6-7.
- Ron Galella Exclusive Diary. 2004, Photology. ISBN 978-8888359137.
- Disco Years. 2006, PowerHouse Books. ISBN 978-1-57687-325-0.
- Warhol by Galella: That's Great!. 2008, Verlhac; Montacelli; Seeman Henschel. ISBN 978-1-58093-204-2.
- No Pictures. 2008, PowerHouse. ISBN 978-1-57687-457-8.
- Viva l'Italia!. 2009, Galella; Distributed by PowerHouse. ISBN 978-0-615-28678-5.
- Man in the Mirror: Michael Jackson. 2009, PowerHouse. ISBN 978-1-57687-535-3.
- Boxing with the Stars. 2011, Verlhac. ISBN 978-2-916954-82-0.
- Ron Galella: Paparazzo Extraordinaire with Mathias Prinz. 2012, Hatje Cantz. ISBN 978-3-7757-3324-3.
- Jackie: My Obsession. 2013, Galella. ISBN 978-0-9857519-0-6.
- Pop, Rock & Dance. 2013, Galella. ISBN 978-0-9857519-2-0.
- The Stories Behind the Pictures. 2014, Galella. ISBN 978-0-9857519-3-7.
- Sex in Fashion. 2015, Galella. ISBN 978-0-9857519-4-4.
- Rock and Roll. 2016, Galella. ISBN 978-0-9857519-5-1.
- Donald Trump the Master Builder. 2017, Galella. ISBN 978-0-9857519-6-8.
- Shooting Stars. January 2019, Galella. ISBN 978-0-9857519-7-5.
- 100 Iconic Photographs – A retrospective by Ron Galella. November 2021, Galella. ISBN 978-1-7378102-1-6.

== Exhibitions ==
- Soho Gallery, 1972, New York City
- G. Ray Hawkins Gallery, 1976, New York City
- Rizzoli Gallery, 1976, New York City
- Union Carbide, 1977, New York City
- William Lyons Gallery, 1980 Coconut Grove, Florida
- Octagon Club, 1987, New York City
- Nikon Gallery, 1993, New York City
- Serge Sorokko Gallery, 1997, New York City
- Andy Warhol Museum, Ron Galella Retrospective, June 2002 – September 2002 Pittsburgh, PA
- Paul Kasmin Gallery, The Photographs of Ron Galella, 2002, New York City
- Holt-Renfrew, Flick, 2003 Toronto, Canada
- Photology, Ron Galella Exclusive Diary, 2004 Milan, Italy
- Galerie Wouter van Leeuwen, The Photographs of Ron Galella, 2004/5, Amsterdamn, Netherlands
- Artelibro Festival of Art and Books, Ron Galella Exclusive Diary: Caught Off-Guard, 2005, Bologna, Italy
- Ferragamo Gallery, Ron Galella Exclusive Diary: Caught Off-Guard, 2005, New York City
- Kunstforum, Superstars: From Warhol to Madonna, 2005/6
- PowerHouse Arena, Ron Galella: The Kennedy, New York City
- Paul Kasmin Gallery, Disco Years, 2005/6, New York City
- Buro Beelende Kunst Vlissinger Ron Galella: The One and Only Paparazzo, Brooklyn, New York
- Galerie Wouter van Leeuwen, Disco Years, 2006/7, Amsterdamn, Netherlands
- PowerHouse Arena, Warhol is Dead!, 2007
- The Gershwin Hotel – 2007, New York City
- PowerHouse Arena, That 70's Show, 2007 Brooklyn, New York
- The Museum of Modern Art, Iconic Photos of Ron Galella acquired into collection, 2007, New York City
- The Museum of Modern Art, Iconic Photos of Ron Galella acquired into collection, 2008, New York City
- The Tate Modern Museum, Street + Studio: An Urban History of Photography, 2008 London, England
- The Hollywood Roosevelt Hotel Warhol by Galella: That's Great!, 2008–Present Hollywood, CA
- Galerie Wouter van Leeuwen, Warhol by Galella: That's Great!, 2008–Present Amsterdam, Netherlands
- Staly-Wise Gallery, Warhol by Galella: That's Great!, 2008–Present, New York City
- GMW Law Offices, Offguard: Ron Galella Photography, 2008–Present Den Haag, Netherlands
- Helmut Newton Foundation Museum of Photography, Pigozzi and the Paparazzi, 2008 Berlin, Germany
- Hamburger Bahnfof Museum Fur Gegenwart, Celebrities: Andy Warhol and the Stars 2008/9
- Palazzo Lanfranchi, Carlo Levi Hall, Ron Galella: Italian Icons, 2009, Matera, Italy
- Archeology Museum of Muro Lucano, Viva l'Italia, 2009–Present
- La Casa Encendida, 2009, Madrid, Spain
- MART Museo di arte moderna e contemporanea di Trento e Rovereto, Picturing New York: Photographs from the Museum of Modern Art, 2009, Rovereto, Italy
- Centaur Theatre Company, Viva l'Italia, 2009, Montreal, Canada
- Irish Museum of Modern Art, Picturing New York: Photographs from the Museum of Modern Art, 2009/10, Dublin
- Lena Di Gangi Gallery, The Photographs of Ron Galella, 2009/10, Totawa, NJ
- PowerHouse Arena, Man in the Mirror: Michael Jackson by Ron Galella, 2009, Brooklyn, NY
- Foam Fotografiemuseum Amsterdam, Netherlands- Ron Galella: Paparazzo Extraordinaire!, 2012
- Galerie La Flo, St. Tropex France, Boxing with the Stars, 2012
- Fundación Novacaixagalicia, Ron Galella: Paparazzo Extraordinaire!, La Coruña, Spain, 2013/14, Pontevedra, Spain, 2014
- Centre Pompidou Paparazzi!, Metz, France, Photographers, Stars, and Artists, 2014
- Staley-Wise Gallery, Pop, Rock & Dance, 2013/14, New York City
- Fotomuseum Winterthur, Switzerland, 2014
- Albertina, Blow-Up -Vienna, Austria, 2014
- Schirn Kunsthalle, Frankfurt, Germany, Paparazzi! Photographers, Stars, and Artists, 2014
- Musée de l'Elysée, Lausanne, Switzerland, Paparazzi! Photographers, Stars, and Artists, 2014/15
- C/O Berlin, Berlin, Germany, Blow-Up, 2015
- Photology Noto, Noto, Sicily, Vintage Galella, 2015
- Photology Garzón, Garzón, Uruguay, Vintage Galella, 2016
- Staley Wise Gallery, New York City, 55 Years a Paparazzi, 2015
- Int'l Center for Photography, New York City, Public, Private Secret, 2017
- Photology Online Gallery, Exclusive Diary, 2021
- Palazzo Sarcinelli, Conegliano, Italy, Ron Galella, Paparazzo Superstar, 2022
