= Thomas Carney (mixologist) =

English-American mixologist (1940–2022)

- Born: Thomas Thaddeus Carney; January 29, 1940; Liverpool, England
- Died: August 30, 2022 (aged 82); Palm City, Florida, U.S.
- Occupation: Mixologist
- Spouse: Rosemary Carney
- Children: 3

Thomas Thaddeus Carney (January 29, 1940 – August 30, 2022) was an English-American mixologist. He was best known as the bartender at Elaine Kaufman's iconic bar and restaurant Elaine's in New York City.

== Biography ==
Carney was born in Liverpool, the son of Agnes Campbell and Thomas, a rail worker. At the age of two, his father died of tuberculosis. At the age of fourteen, he worked on a galley of the Cunard Line, which was based at the Carnival House. Carney sailed to Montreal, then later emigrated to New York. After arriving in New York, he worked as a waiter at numerous restaurants.

Carney first visited Elaine Kaufman's bar and restaurant Elaine's in 1978. He was soon hired to work as a bartender at Elaine's, where he served such notable people as film director, writer, actor and comedian Woody Allen, actor Al Pacino, singer, songwriter, actor and film producer Mick Jagger, actor Michael Caine and comedian and actor Don Rickles, crooner Frank Sinatra, and novelist, journalist, essayist, playwright, activist, filmmaker and actor Norman Mailer, among others.

In 2007, Carney retired from his job as a bartender at Elaine's, which held a celebration in honor of his retirement. After retiring, he moved to Florida, where he took up golf. He also established at least two restaurants in Westwood, New Jersey and Sparkill, New York. He died in August 2022 of chronic obstructive pulmonary disease at his home in Palm City, Florida in his sleep, at the age of 82.
