= Bobby Zarem =

American publicist (1936–2021)

- Born: Robert Myron Zarem; September 30, 1936; Savannah, Georgia, U.S.
- Died: September 26, 2021 (aged 84); Savannah, Georgia, U.S.
- Education: Phillips Academy Andover, Yale University
- Occupation: Public relations agent

Robert Myron Zarem (September 30, 1936 – September 26, 2021), commonly known as Bobby Zarem, was an American publicist and press agent. His clients included celebrities such as Dustin Hoffman, Cher, Arnold Schwarzenegger, Michael Jackson, Diana Ross, Michael Douglas, Michael Caine, Sophia Loren, Ann-Margret, Alan Alda, among others.

== Early life ==
Robert Myron Zarem was born on September 30, 1936, in Savannah, Georgia, to Rose (Gold) and Harry Zarem. He was raised in an Orthodox Jewish household and was the youngest of three sons. Zarem's father owned a shoe company, and his mother was a pianist. When he was a child, his parents would travel to New York City and bring him back autographed playbills and menus. He would sometimes accompany them, attending Broadway shows that gave him an appreciation for the industry.

Zarem's trips to New York City became more frequent when his father moved there to receive treatment for lung cancer at the Memorial Sloan Kettering Cancer Center. Zarem would stay with his father in the Waldorf Astoria, sitting by the front entrance and collecting autographs from the hotel's famous patrons. When Zarem was thirteen, his father died from cancer, which greatly impacted him. "I was scared to get close to anybody out of fear that that person, too, would disappear," Zarem said.

Though Zarem struggled with attention-deficit disorder (ADD) his entire life, he attended Phillips Academy Andover and Yale University. He graduated from Yale with a degree in political science. After graduation, Zarem moved to New York City and worked for a year and a half at the United States Trust Company until he received a draft notice in 1960 from the Army. He ultimately joined the Air National Guard for a brief time.

== Career ==
=== Press agent ===
Zarem's first job in show business was at Columbia Artists Management, where he worked for five years. He discovered an affinity for public relations and artist promotion, and began his career as a PR agent under producer Joseph E. Levine in 1968. Zarem became an agent somewhat by chance; the company had seventeen minutes of the film The Lion in Winter starring Katharine Hepburn and Peter O'Toole, even though Zarem had been working for the company in a business capacity, he invited a number of his friends, including some journalists, to watch the preview of the film. When articles on the movie began to appear in publication, Zarem realized he had become a PR agent, and Levine later made him head of magazine publicity.

Zarem moved on to the PR firm Rogers & Cowan in 1969. There he served some of his first prominent clients, including Ann-Margret and Dustin Hoffman. He began handwriting personalized letters and press releases that became well-known in the industry. In 1974, Zarem started his own agency: Zarem, Inc. He promoted Tommy which premiered in the West 57th Street subway station in front of hundreds of New York socialites. He earned the nickname Superflack at a party he threw for Stevie Wonder in the late 1970s. Mick Jagger and New York Times reporter Judy Klemesrud were waiting by the elevator when Wonder finally showed up. Zarem reprimanded Wonder for tardiness in front of Klemesrud, and she deemed him "Superflack", which was later popularized in a profile on Zarem in Newsweek.

Zarem also frequently promoted films. He would call outlets and say that films reeked of Oscar, threatening to kill himself if the outlet refused to write a piece for him. He regularly worked fourteen hour days, had a short temper, and was known to hold grudges. Publicist Peggy Siegal claimed he had thrown a typewriter across a desk at her for incorrectly taking down a phone message, but he denied the charge by pointing out how difficult it would have been to miss her with such a large instrument at such close range.

Zarem is credited with helping save Saturday Night Fever from obscurity. Though Paramount and Robert Stigwood had hired Zarem to publicize the movie, they expected the movie to fail and did not let Zarem send promotional pictures to media outlets. However, several magazines were already eager for material on the film, and when Martha Duffy, art editor for Time, asked Zarem how soon he could get her pictures, he stormed the Paramount office. When the Saturday Night Fever's marketing director refused to give Zarem any pictures, Zarem pushed the marketing director onto a couch and rushed across the hall to the art department, taking six color negatives that he sent to The New York Times, Time, Newsweek, and People.

Zarem claimed that he was responsible for Arnold Schwarzenegger's success. Zarem had watched an early screening of the documentary, Pumping Iron, starring the then-unknown Schwarzenegger. Zarem secured the documentary's first national coverage on his own initiative and was hired to promote the film. At Schwarzenegger's request, Zarem scheduled a meeting between Schwarzenegger and Jacqueline Kennedy Onassis. A picture from the meeting gained significant media attention and earned Schwarzenegger a spot on 60 Minutes, helping to establish his fame. Schwarzenegger and Zarem collaborated again on the Planet Hollywood restaurant franchise in the early 1990s. Schwarzenegger was one of the principal celebrity investors; Zarem, who had previously promoted the Hard Rock Café, was hired to promote the new restaurant chain. Zarem claimed that he conceived the idea to make Planet Hollywood a national chain, developed the signature aesthetic of the restaurants, and put together its financiers, Keith Barish and Robert Earl. However he ultimately feuded with Barish and Earl over credit, and left the company a year later.

Throughout the 1970s, 1980s, and 1990s, Zarem promoted the films Tommy, Saturday Night Fever, The China Syndrome, Rambo, Scarface, Pee-wee's Big Adventure, and Dances With Wolves. By the turn of the century, his fees were estimated to be upwards of $10,000 a month per client.

In 1994, Zarem was sent 10 copies of John Behrendt's true crime book, Midnight in the Garden of Good and Evil by the publisher, Random House, in hopes that he would spread the word to his contacts in Savannah, where the book is set. The book quickly became popular in the city. Zarem wrote an item for Neil Travis's column in the New York Post about the stir the book caused, which he said secured the book's international bestseller status. The book spent 216 weeks on the New York Times Best Seller list. Savannah attracts tourists drawn to the city by the book and its landmarks, and there are many guided tours of the locations in the book.

=== "I Love New York" campaign ===
Zarem conceived the public relations for I Love New York campaign and helped in its development. In 1975, Zarem was walking home from Elaine's on Second Avenue in Manhattan, and realized "you could have rolled a coin down the street and nobody would have stopped it. The city was dying. Something had to be done." Distraught by the decline of New York's reputation as a cultural hub and declining Broadway ticket sales, William Doyle hired Zarem and brought on the advertising agency Wells Rich Greene to implement his ideas for the television campaign starring Broadway stars, which helped turn around tourism for the city. Governor Hugh Carey raised $16 million for the campaign, and when it proved a success, New York mayor Ed Koch started claiming credit for the slogan, as did Wells Rich Greene. However, He maintained that, other than the iconic heart-shaped logo designed by Milton Glaser, he was responsible for the campaign.

=== Denise Rich controversy ===
Before she met Zarem, Denise Rich had primarily been known as the wife of commodities trader Marc Rich, who had been accused of owing millions of dollars to the United States government and fled the country for Switzerland. Baby Jane Holzer introduced Denise Rich to Zarem in 1991, hoping that Zarem could help Rich gain recognition as a songwriter. Zarem and Rich grew close and he assisted her in her career, which allowed her to become more well known on the New York social scene.

When Rich became involved in the Democratic Party and began donating hundreds of thousands of dollars, critics accused her of angling for a pardon for Marc, and believed Zarem was masterminding her campaign. Zarem denied this accusation, citing his life-long support of the Democratic party and insisting that his only motive was to sway Rich to support causes he cared for.

These charges peaked in January 2001, when President Bill Clinton issued a number of pardons on his last day in office, including one for Marc. Zarem dismissed claims that Denise had taken any direct action to bring about Marc's pardon. Days later, news broke that Denise had written a letter to Bill Clinton asking for clemency for Marc, contradicting what Zarem had been telling the press (and what Denise had told Zarem). Zarem claimed that it was he who exaggerated Denise's surprised reaction into a denial, but when Denise invoked the Fifth Amendment at a congressional hearing, many in the press portrayed Zarem as having been misled by Denise.

=== Savannah Film Festival ===
In 1998, the Savannah Film Festival was a year old and based at the Savannah College of Art and Design (SCAD) when Zarem took over its program, a job he would maintain until 2013. The festival honors excellence in film and rewards prizes to nurture young talent. Zarem was responsible for attracting A-list names to the event and often met with SCAD students in an advisory capacity. In 2010, Zarem moved back to Savannah and received the festival's Lifetime Achievement Award.

== Feuds ==
Zarem was involved in several disputes with notable figures. One of the most publicized was his spat with gossip columnist Liz Smith. Zarem believed Smith was the author behind the pseudonym "Robin Adams Sloan", a columnist who wrote critical coverage of Zarem's clients. He asked her to stop writing negative press about his clients but Smith refused, turning the disparaging focus of the column on Zarem himself. He responded by sending out hundreds of wedding announcements, revealing Smith's recent marriage to Iris Love, her partner, effectively outing Smith as gay. Smith was angry, but to her knowledge, Love never saw the announcements. Although Zarem denied responsibility for the prank at the time, he would admit to conceiving of the announcements decades later. Zarem later accused Smith of murder, a charge she laughed off.

Zarem also feuded with Page Six gossip columnist, Claudia Cohen. The feud started when she approached Zarem and asked him to pass on a note to Kirk Douglas, with whom he was eating lunch. Not knowing that Cohen and Douglas knew each other, Zarem hid her note under his plate. She returned to his table and told him that if he didn't give her note to Douglas, she would ban him from Page Six. He ripped up both notes, stuffed them in his mouth, and pretended to swallow.

Zarem had a falling out with his early client, Dustin Hoffman, for years. Zarem represented Hoffman as he was becoming a star in the early 1970s. On December 31, 1973, the last day of Zarem's contract with Hoffman, the actor asked Zarem to get him some marijuana. After searching in Greenwich Village, Zarem bought some and deposited it through Hoffman's mail slot. Zarem did not hear from Hoffman for years, and when the two saw each other again decades later, Zarem said Hoffman asked him if he still hated him.

== Elaine's ==
Elaine's was an Upper East Side restaurant opened by Elaine Kaufman in 1963. Three weeks after its opening, Zarem discovered the restaurant and frequented the place for the next forty-seven years, eating there at least twice a week. He began bringing his celebrity clients to the restaurant. He and Kaufman became close friends and she encouraged him to open his own agency in 1974.

It was at Elaine's that Zarem introduced Mia Farrow to Woody Allen. Allen was a regular there and Farrow asked Zarem to introduce her. Zarem obliged, and after Farrow left that night, Zarem gave Allen her number at Allen's request.

When Zarem moved back to Savannah in 2010, he held his farewell party at Elaine's. Less than a year later, Elaine died of emphysema and pulmonary hypertension. "I just don't know what to say", Zarem said after Kaufman's death. "We were best friends and extremely supportive of one another." Elaine's closed within months of Kaufman's death.

== Personal life ==
Zarem never married and reportedly never had an intimate relationship. He said that not having a partner allowed him to devote more time to his work and be a better agent.

For over thirty years, Zarem was a client of Czechoslovak psychiatrist Samuel Lowy. While he was in therapy, he often recommended Lowy to his friends.

Zarem spoke about his psychological motivations for becoming a PR agent, telling Hampton's magazine, "I think that's why I did what I did. Not feeling that I had anything to communicate, I felt that if I made the rest of the world accept Dustin Hoffman and Ann-Margret and Cher, and all these people, then I would be accepted." He also said, "To be loved and accepted. I don't think there's any doubt that's one of the things I've always wanted most."

Zarem died in his native Savannah on September 26, 2021, aged 84, from complications of lung cancer, the same disease that claimed his father. He was 4 days shy of his 85th birthday.

=== Legacy ===
Zarem is regarded as an influential New York publicist. He trained PR agents such as Peggy Siegal, Jason Weinberg, Liz Rosenberg, and Peter Himler, and mentored filmmakers like James Kicklighter.

Zarem lamented the state of PR in the present day, saying that "It's a whole different world and there's no logic to it, no building of a campaign. Today there is no schedule or program anymore, because there are so many outlets that by the time major publications learn something it's already been out on Gawker or Nikki Finke."

Al Pacino's character, Eli Wurman, in the 2002 film People I Know was inspired by Zarem. Director Daniel Algrant had met Zarem in the early 1990s and said that the idea for his film came from watching Zarem, confined to his apartment by a broken leg, conduct his business over the phone against the backdrop of the New York City skyline. Pacino spent time with Zarem, to prepare for his role.
