= Barillari =

Barillari is a surname. Notable people with the surname include:

- Al Barillari (1917–2007), American baseball pitcher, manager, and scout
- Alexandre Barillari (born 1975), Brazilian actor
- Rino Barillari (born 1945), Italian photographer
