= Elaine's =

Restaurant in New York City (1963–2011)

- Interactive map of Elaine's

Restaurant information
- Established: 1963
- Closed: 2011
- Location: 1703 Second Avenue, New York City, Manhattan, New York, 10128, United States
- Coordinates: 40.77918°N 73.95077°W

Elaine's was a bar and restaurant in New York City that operated from 1963 to 2011. It was frequented by many celebrities, particularly actors and authors. The restaurant was established, owned and named after Elaine Kaufman, who was closely associated with the establishment, which closed shortly after Kaufman's death.

Elaine's was located on the Upper East Side, at 1703 Second Avenue, near East 88th Street in Manhattan.

== History ==
Established in 1963, Elaine's was known for its chain-smoking proprietress Elaine Kaufman, who operated the restaurant for over four decades, as well as the numerous writers and other prominent New Yorkers who were regular patrons, including Nelson W. Aldrich Jr., Woody Allen, Noel Behn, Chuck Blazer, William J. Bratton, Candace Bushnell, Paul Desmond, Joan Didion, Jared Faber, Mia Farrow, Clay Felker, Helen Frankenthaler, Joseph Heller, Jill Krementz, Peter Maas, Norman Mailer, Robert Motherwell, George Plimpton, Mario Puzo, Sally Quinn, Daniel Simone, Gay Talese, Kurt Vonnegut, Tom Wolfe, Bobby Zarem, and Sidney Zion.

Other visitors to the establishment included Alan Alda, Lucille Ball, Leonard Bernstein, Michael Caine, Kirk Douglas, Clint Eastwood, Mick Jagger, Willie Nelson, Jacqueline Kennedy Onassis, Luciano Pavarotti, Don Rickles, Eli Wallach, and Elaine Stritch, who served as bartender in 1964. Mixologist Thomas Carney served as the bartender from 1978 until 2007.

The restaurant hosted an annual Oscar night event, where celebrities and visiting Hollywood figures gathered to watch the Academy Awards ceremony.

Kaufman had a reputation for directness, moving less-favored customers to accommodate new arrivals and refusing to serve hamburgers. She was once arrested after a physical altercation with a visiting Texan. Kaufman also had a physical confrontation with actress Tara Tyson, later claiming that Tyson had burned her with a lit cigarette. She once chased away paparazzo Ron Galella by hurling two garbage can lids at him and exclaiming, "Beat it, creep... you're bothering my customers". In 2003, when New York City banned smoking in restaurants, Kaufman claimed to have quit smoking several years earlier but expressed displeasure about customers being forced to forgo tobacco at their seats.

== In culture ==
Billy Joel referenced the establishment in his song "Big Shot" (1978), with the lyrics, "They were all impressed with your Halston dress and the people that you knew at Elaine's".

The opening dinner scene from Woody Allen's Manhattan (1979) was filmed at the restaurant, as was a scene from his later work Celebrity (1998). There is a brief sequence in the film Morning Glory (2010) with Elaine Kaufman playing herself at the bar of Elaine's, where the producer played by Rachel McAdams is attempting to locate the television host played by Harrison Ford, and Elaine relates at what time he left. In the comedy Big Business (1988), to divert a mismatched set of twins (played by Bette Midler and Lily Tomlin) from disrupting an important shareholder vote, Midler's character offers to take them to Elaine's.

In the 2018 American television miniseries The Looming Tower, the main character John O'Neill, played by Jeff Daniels, is frequently seen at Elaine's. The character of Elaine is played by actress Barbara Rosenblat in episodes 1 and 6.

On May 10, 2014, The Moth Radio Hour featured pre-recorded monologues about experiences at Elaine's by George Plimpton (featuring his introducing Jerry Spinelli to writers, editors, and director Woody Allen at Elaine's, two months before Houghton Mifflin published Spinelli's first book) and Plimpton's friend José Torres (who recounted an anecdote he had shared at Elaine's, about overcoming his fear the first time he faced a white opponent in the boxing ring).

Until its closing, Elaine's was a frequent dinner spot in Stuart Woods's novel series featuring Stone Barrington, with the author typically beginning the first paragraph with "Elaine's. Late". (Note: See, for example, Woods, Stuart (2007). Shoot Him If He Runs. G.P. Putnam's Sons. ISBN 978-0-399-15444-7.)

The restaurant is the subject of A.E. Hotchner's 2013 book Everyone Comes to Elaine's: Forty Years of Movie Stars, All-Stars, Literary Lions, Financial Scions, Top Cops, Politicians, and Power Brokers at the Legendary Hot Spot.

== Closing ==
Elaine Kaufman died from chronic obstructive pulmonary disease (COPD) and pulmonary hypertension on December 3, 2010, aged 81. Kaufman willed the establishment to longtime manager Diane Becker. Becker closed the restaurant soon thereafter; it shut down on May 26, 2011 after a 46-year run. Becker later explained her decision to close the restaurant: "The truth is, there is no Elaine's without Elaine... the business is just not there without Elaine."

In late 2013, The Writing Room, owned by Michael and Susy Glick, opened in Elaine's former space, featuring the previous restaurant's original canopy and paying homage to the famous writers who frequented Elaine's. This restaurant closed in 2020 due to the COVID-19 pandemic. As of 2024, the site hosts a French restaurant, Café d'Alsace, which moved there in 2021, renovating the interior.

== See also ==
- Chasen's
