= Leon Gast =

American film director (1936–2021)

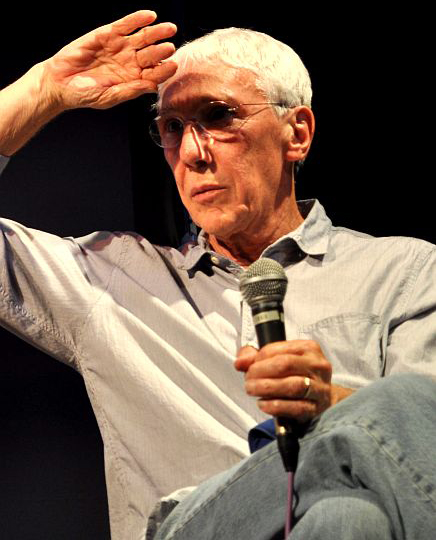
- June 2010
- Born: Leon Jacques Gast; March 30, 1936; Jersey City, New Jersey, U.S.
- Died: March 8, 2021 (aged 84); Woodstock, New York, U.S.
- Occupations: Filmmaker; artist
- Notable work: When We Were Kings
- Spouse: Geri Spolan (m. 1991)
- Children: 2

Leon Jacques Gast (March 30, 1936 – March 8, 2021) was an American documentary film director, producer, cinematographer, and editor. His documentary, When We Were Kings depicts the iconic heavyweight boxing match: The Rumble in the Jungle between Muhammad Ali and George Foreman. This film would go on to win the 1996 Academy Award for Best Documentary Feature and the Independent Spirit Award. Gast co-directed the 1977 documentary, The Grateful Dead Movie with guitarist Jerry Garcia. The film captured the band's October 1974, five-night performance at the Winterland Ballroom in San Francisco. Gast also co-directed the 1983 film Hell's Angels Forever, which focused on the notorious motorcycle club Hells Angels. The Angels are believed to have learned that Gast put material in the documentary which they didn't prefer. To this end, Gast claimed that the Angels tracked him down and beat him up. Gast also produced works on B.B. King and Celia Cruz.

== Early life ==
A native of Jersey City, New Jersey, Gast graduated from Henry Snyder High School and studied dramatic arts at Columbia University, and in that same period worked on the television series High Adventure with writer and broadcaster Lowell Thomas. Gast is also known for his still photography which has appeared in such magazines as Vogue, Esquire, and Harper's Bazaar. Gast would make album covers for Fania All-Stars which would lead him to make Our Latin Thing.

== Kinshasa & When We Were Kings ==
Leon Gast is best known for his documentary When We Were Kings, for which he won the Academy Award for Best Documentary Feature. The film details the boxing match known as "The Rumble in the Jungle" between Muhammad Ali and George Foreman. Ali defeated Foreman in the fight, for which the two split a $10 million purse.

Gast was not originally supposed to film this documentary. Gast went to Kinshasa and was still a photographer who had one documentary which was on Latin music. Gast was hired to create a documentary about a three-day music festival that was happening in Kinshasa when the fight was occurring. Zaire's ruler declared the concert free-of-charge days before it was supposed to happen. This was problematic because funds for the documentary were supposed to come directly from the proceeds of the festival. Five days before the scheduled fight, Foreman acquired a bad cut above one of his eyes and the fight was pushed back six weeks. Gast turned his attention to the fight and centered the documentary on Ali.

When Gast returned from Kinshasa, he had 300,000 feet of 16mm film (138 hours). Initially Gast didn't have the money to finish the documentary, so he paid the bills by making documentaries on the Grateful Dead and the Hell's Angels. In 1989, Gast's former lawyer, David Sonenberg, helped Gast out by putting up almost $1 million to finish the project. The film was first featured at the 1996 Sundance Film festival. Gast won an award for the documentary and was eventually premiered at Radio City Music Hall. Gast spent close to two decades on When We Were Kings. This documentary was focused towards the comeback of Ali who was forced into exile after he objected to the draft during the Vietnam Draft. When We Were Kings has received strongly positive critical reaction. The documentary highlighted an important time in sports. Susan Ryan, who is a Cineaste reviewer, said “this entertaining documentary shows the boxer at one of the most celebrated moments in his career, dancing around the press, and preaching black pride with the same skill that he once used dancing around the ring”.

== Golden Door International Film Festival ==
Leon Gast has also been awarded the lifetime achievement award at the Golden Door International Film Festival in 2012. Gast is one of a small group of New Jersey natives to have won an Oscar. Frank Sinatra (Hoboken) won for From Here To Eternity, Bruce Springsteen (Freehold) won for Philadelphia. Jed Dimatteo presented the award to Gast. Dimatteo also is a Jersey City social historian and publisher of the Jersey Journal newsletter. Dimatteo was involved in planning the festival and brought up Gast's name after he rediscovered Gast's work.

== Other works ==
Gast's 2010 project is a documentary entitled Smash His Camera, a film about paparazzo photographer Ron Galella. The film won the award for best director of a documentary at the 2010 Sundance Film Festival. Galella got his start in street journalism. Galella “is best known for his obsessive ten-year pursuit of Jacqueline Kennedy Onassis, which resulted in a lengthy court case weighing the rights of the press vs. the individual's fight to privacy.”

Gast directed his second documentary on a boxing legend, Manny, with Ryan Moore. It focuses on the boxing career of Manny Pacquiao, detailing his rise from poverty to the very top of the boxing world.

== Personal life and death ==
Gast married Geri Spolan in 1991. He had two children from a previous marriage.

Gast died from complications of Alzheimer's disease at his home in Woodstock, New York, on March 8, 2021.

== Filmography ==
- Our Latin Thing (Nuestra Cosa) (1972)
- Celia Cruz and the Fania Allstars in Africa (1974)
- The Grateful Dead Movie (1974); as a co-director for Jerry Garcia
- B.B. King - Sweet 16 (1974)
- Hells Angels Forever (1983)
- When We Were Kings (1996)
- One Love (2003)
- Soul Power (2008)
- Smash His Camera (2010)
- The Trials of Muhammad Ali (2013) (executive producer)
- Manny (2014)

== Awards ==
- Special Jury Recognition, Sundance Film Festival (1996 – When We Were Kings)
- Academy Award for Best Documentary Feature (1997 – When We Were Kings)
- Independent Spirit Truer than Fiction Award (1997 – When We Were Kings)
- National Society of Film Critics Award for Best Non-Fiction Film (1997 - When We Were Kings)
- Sundance Film Festival Directing Award: U.S. Documentary (2010 – Smash His Camera)
- News & Documentary Emmy Award for Outstanding Historical Programming (2015 – Independent Lens)
