= Smash His Camera =

- Directed by: Leon Gast
- Starring: Ron Galella
- Edited by: Doug Abel
- Distributed by: DreamWorks Pictures; HBO Documentary Films
- Release date: January 18, 2010 (Sundance)
- Running time: 87 minutes
- Country: United States
- Language: English

Smash His Camera is a 2010 documentary film directed by filmmaker Leon Gast about the life and career of paparazzi photographer Ron Galella. The film won the "Directing Award Documentary" at the 2010 Sundance Film Festival, and was released on June 18, 2010 through DreamWorks Pictures, and was shown on HBO.
