= Peggy Siegal =

American entertainment publicist (born 1947)

- Born: Peggy Siegal; July 17, 1947 (age 79); Manhattan, New York, U.S.
- Occupations: Media publicist; event planner
- Years active: 1970s–present

Peggy Siegal (born July 17, 1947) is an American entertainment and media publicist who specializes in film. Her company, Peggy Siegal Company, which has offices in New York, Los Angeles, and London, was described as one of the top 12 media marketing firms in 2018.

In 2019, in light of Siegal's previous association and social relationship with financier Jeffrey Epstein, several studio clients such as Netflix, FX Networks, and Annapurna Pictures severed ties with Siegal and her company.

== Early life ==
Peggy Siegal was born in Manhattan, New York, and raised in Englewood Cliffs, New Jersey, by Polish-Jewish parents Martin and Annette Siegal. Her brother, Gary Siegal, was born in 1949. Her grandfather immigrated to the United States from Warsaw, Poland, before settling in New York City and working for Thomas Edison's original lightbulb company. He later set up his own lightbulb company in Brooklyn, which was passed down to her father, Martin, ultimately making her known as the "Lightbulb Princess," in high school.

When Siegal was 12, her mother, Annette, sent her brother, Gary, to a private school but made Peggy go to the public Fort Lee High School; telling The New York Times, "Every day in high school I had to watch my brother come home in a school uniform, going to school with rich kids in New York. I was going to school at Fort Lee High with the children of hairdressers and gas station attendants. This was beyond humiliating." The decision tarnished Siegal's relationship with her mother, later saying, "I never got over this. I felt this intellectual stigma my entire life, and every time someone said to me, 'Where did you go to school?' I hated my mother."

== Career ==
After graduating from Syracuse University, Siegal moved to New York City to pursue a career in fashion. She began working as a junior designer on Seventh Avenue, and eventually established her handbag and accessories line Peggy Siegal for Applause, which was carried at Bloomingdale's. Soon thereafter, she met publicist Bobby Zarem and told him she wanted to work for him, and although he told her he had no money to pay her, she became his secretary anyway. She later left Zarem to work for Lois Smith at Pickwick Public Relations, and started doing publicity for Brian De Palma, Lawrence Kasdan, and Barry Levinson, Billie Jean King, Richard Gere, and Liza Minnelli, who she says "hated" her. For four months in 1982, Siegal lived in Hollywood to work with director Steven Spielberg on E.T. the Extra-Terrestrial, before returning to New York to form the Smith & Siegal firm, which was financed by Siegal's father. Smith left the firm in 1986 to return to Pickwick.

In 2000, Siegal and publicist Lizzie Grubman formed their firm, Lizzie Grubman Public Relations–Peggy Siegal Company, however it dissolved in December of the following year.

Siegal organizes and hosts private events, including film screenings, to which she invites prominent guests to help the film's reception. By 2007, Siegal hosted around 120 events per year, hosting anywhere from 100 to 1,100 guests, and earning $25,000 per event.

Her services are in highest demand in the season before award nominations, in particular the Academy Awards. Her reputation in the industry has been attributed, by her and others, to carefully selecting the guests she invites to these events. According to Siegal, she keeps a list of 30,000 contacts divided by nationality, including filmmakers, artists, writers, and finance professionals.

== Relationship with Jeffrey Epstein ==
In a March 2026 interview with New York Magazine, Siegal said her first interaction with Jeffrey Epstein was either in 2006 or 2007 after he sent a "very expensive" Cartier travel clock to her Upper East Side home. He later called her, referenced people they mutually knew, indicated his wealth, and asked her if she had ever been married, which she says was in attempt to be included on her screening list. "He wanted to find out some weakness in my makeup or my life. There was a sense of danger," said Siegal. She described him as "charming and funny", and said he flattered her constantly, saying, "He couldn't get enough of me. He thought I was funny. He thought I knew everybody. That is sort of hypnotic."

Siegal had previously been described as a friend of Epstein in a 2007 profile in New York Magazine. In 2010, Siegal organized an event at Epstein's mansion whose guests included notable people such as Prince Andrew, George Stephanopoulos, Katie Couric, and Chelsea Handler. In 2011, after Epstein told the New York Post that he wasn't a sexual predator but an 'offender', Siegal said, "He said he'd served his time and assured me that he changed his ways."

In July 2019, after The New York Times reported Siegal's business and social connections with Epstein, some of Siegal's clients, such as Netflix and FX, cancelled their contracts as a result of the Epstein scandal and larger Me Too movement.

In 2025, the United States House of Representatives released documents related to Epstein, including a 2011 email exchange between Epstein and Siegal, in which Epstein asked Siegal to enlist the help of Arianna Huffington (co-founder and then editor-in-chief of The Huffington Post) to refute accusations of him facilitating sexual assault and to send reporters to investigate Virginia Giuffre, one of his accusers. Siegal offered to contact Huffington, but she, Huffington, and The Huffington Post denied that any such message was sent. Siegal later said that she only offered to help Epstein in order to end the conversation. In her own defence, Siegal stated to The New York Times: "The culture before #MeToo was — 'You've done your time, now you're forgiven.'"

In 2026, released emails within the Epstein files showed that Siegal had corresponded with Epstein in 2009 during a trip to Kenya. In the correspondence, she had offered to "bring a little baby back for you….or two. Boys or girls?" She also stated that she planned to pose for photographs in "mud huts" and pretend that she had "crashed the winter White House" and posed "with Obama's relatives".
