= Paparazzi =

Photographers who take candid pictures of celebrities

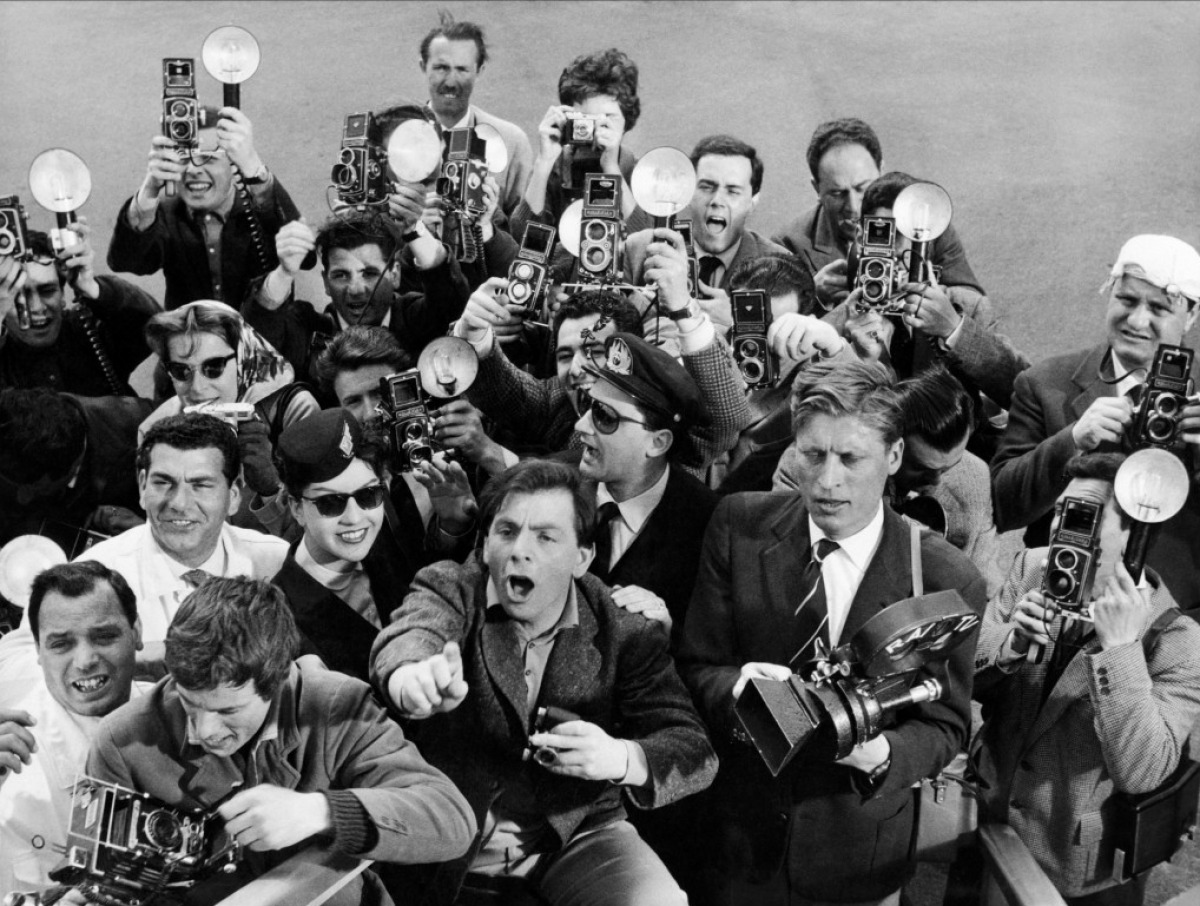
Swarm of paparazzi in a scene from La Dolce Vita (1960), including the original eponymous character Paparazzo

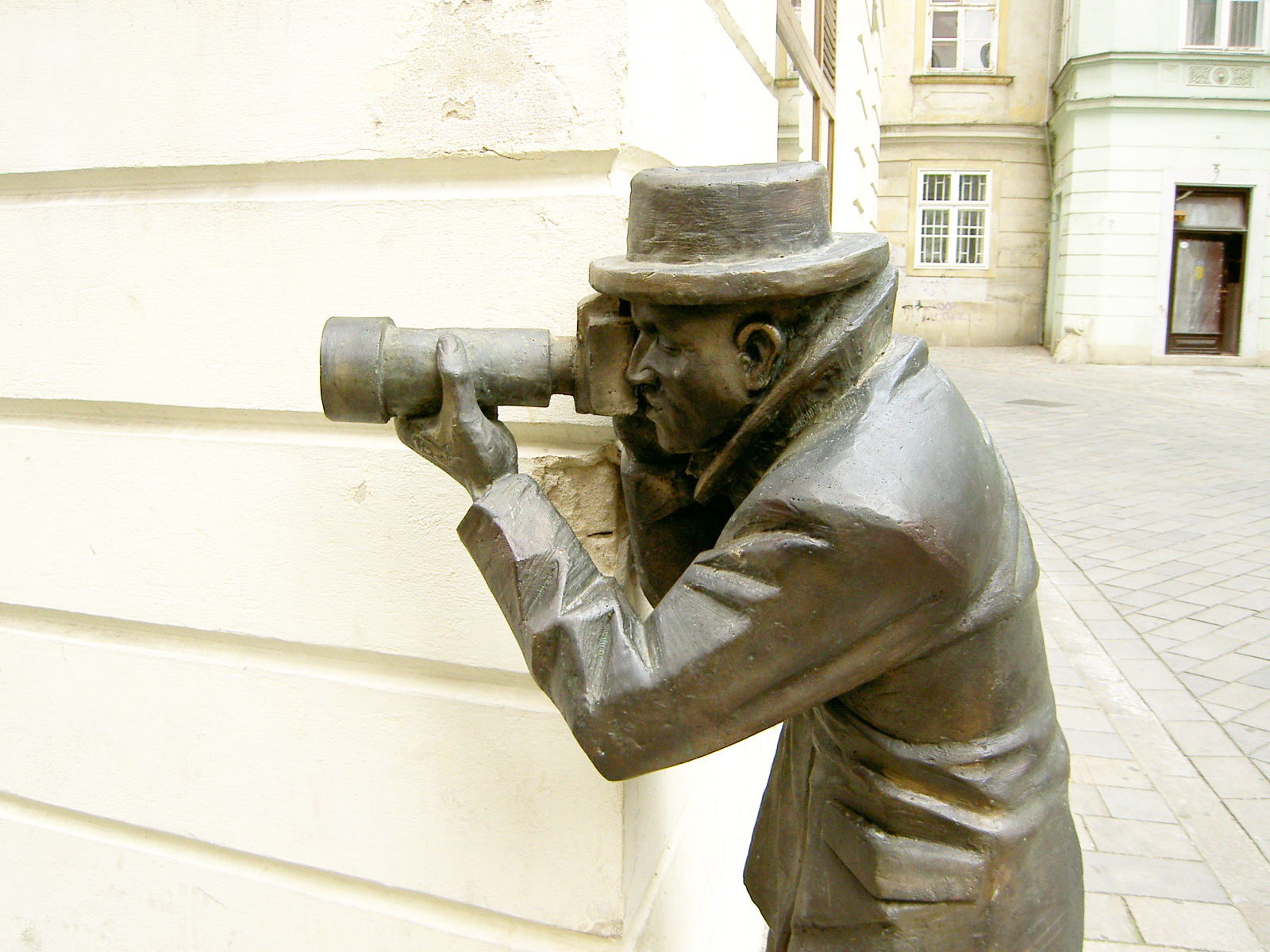
Statue of a paparazzo by sculptor Radko Mačuha in Bratislava, Slovakia

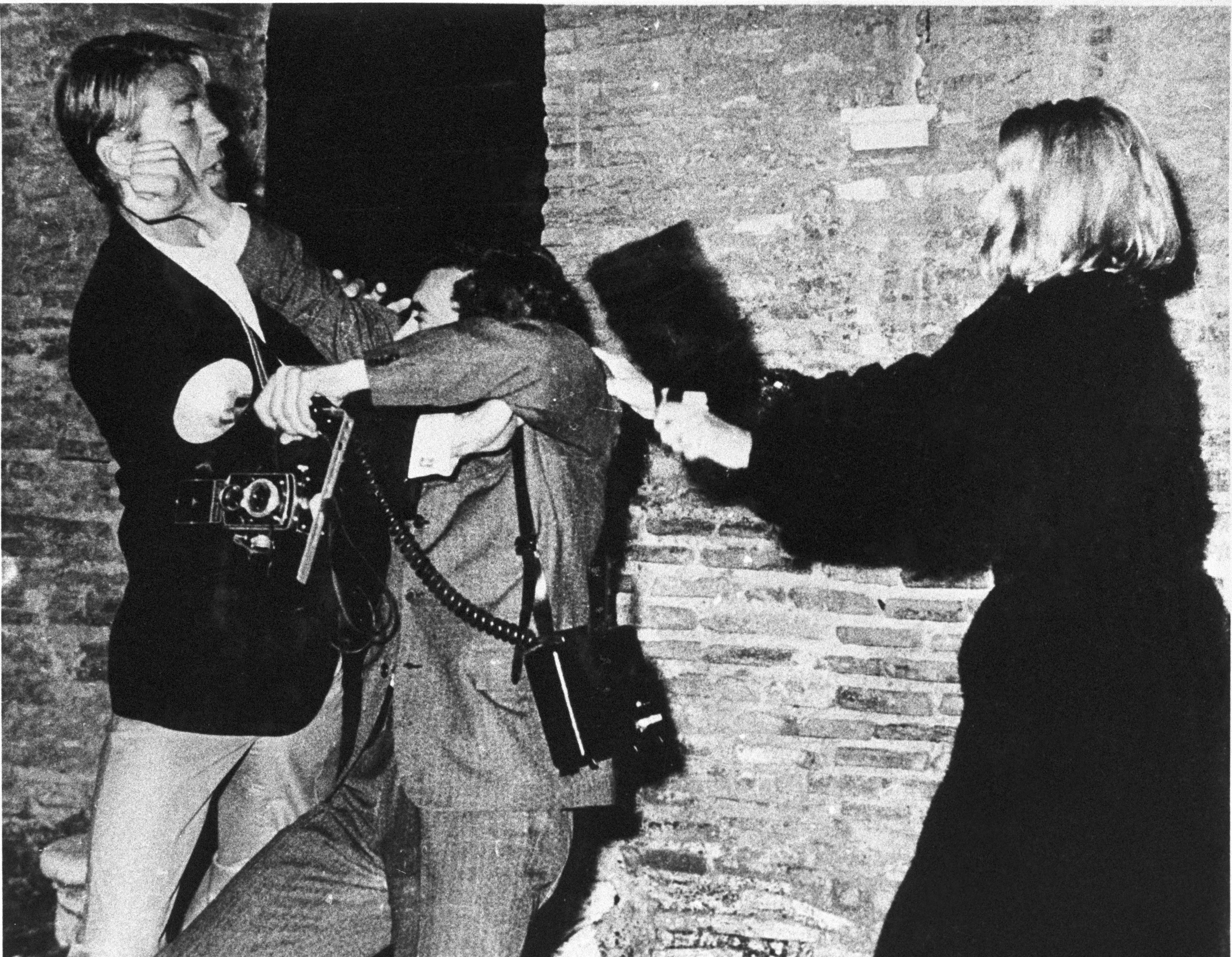
Mickey Hargitay assaults the "King of Paparazzi" Rino Barillari while a woman hits him with her purse on Via Veneto in Rome, 1963.

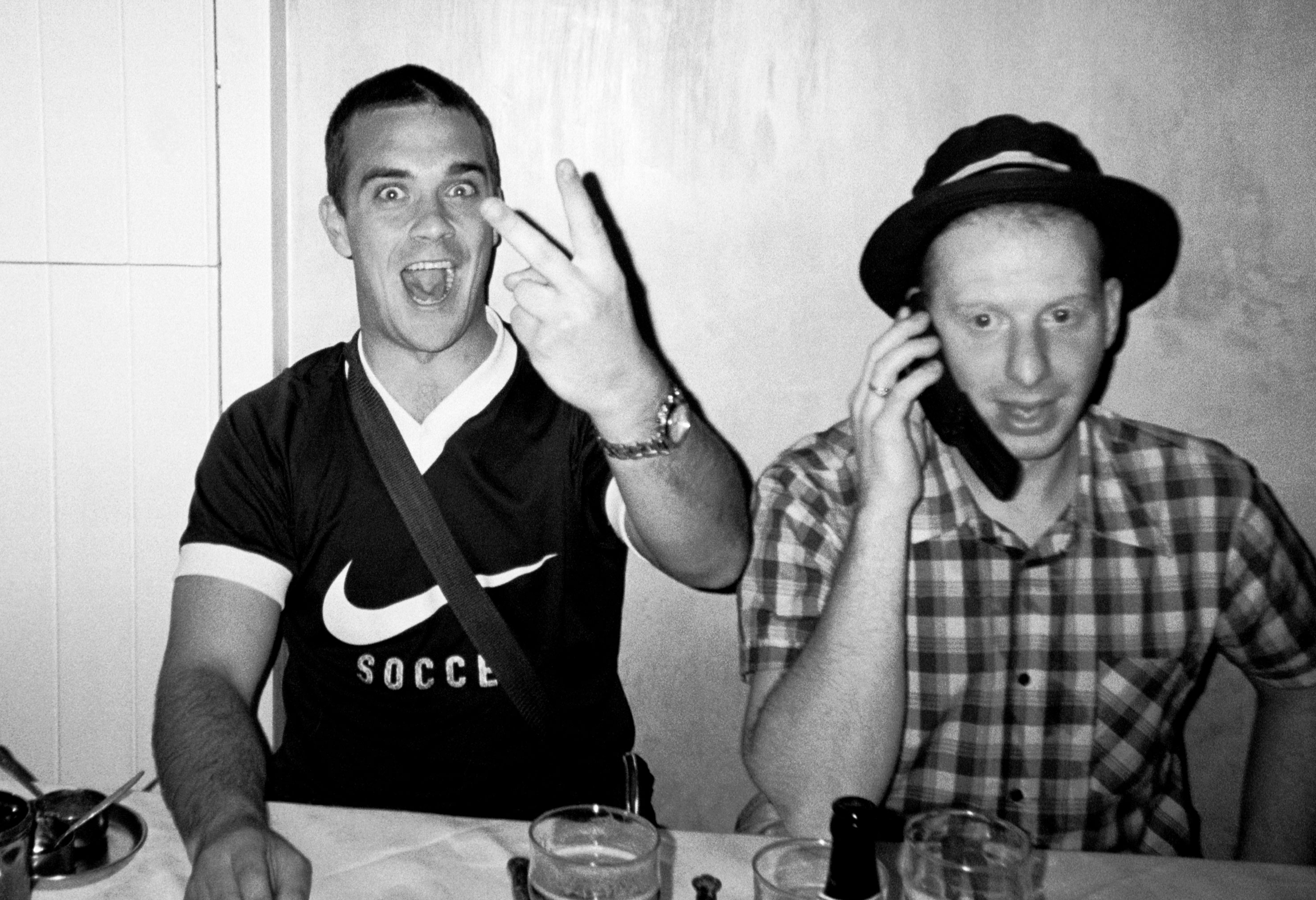
Henry Bond's photograph of English singer-songwriter and entertainer Robbie Williams, shot in a paparazzo style in London in 2000

Paparazzi (singular form paparazzo) are independent photographers who take pictures of high-profile people, such as actors, musicians, athletes, politicians, and other celebrities who go about their daily life routines. Paparazzi are often known for their relentless pursuit of celebrities, often using telephoto lenses and electronic flashes, or even following them in vehicles to capture personal, unflattering, or private moments. The photographs taken by paparazzi are commonly sold to tabloids, gossip magazines, and websites, where they are published to attract attention and increase sales. This type of invasive photography is often controversial because it can violate the privacy of the subjects involved.

== Description ==
Paparazzi tend to be independent contractors, unaffiliated with mainstream media organizations, who track high-profile people and take pictures of them opportunistically. Some journalists have described the behavior of paparazzi as stalking, and anti-stalking laws in many countries address the issue by seeking to reduce harassment of public figures and celebrities, especially when they are with their children. Some public figures and celebrities, such as Adele, Prince Harry, and Kristen Stewart, have expressed concern at the extent to which paparazzi go to invade their personal space. The filing and receiving of judicial support for restraining orders against paparazzi has increased, as have lawsuits with judgments against them.

Paparazzi are often a problem for celebrities, as the latter have become increasingly objectified and worshipped by fans, especially through social and mass media. This happens because constant exposure to and coverage of these figures leads people to treat celebrities like they are their social intimates, whom they admire, gossip about, or copy habits from. A 2009 study which anonymously interviewed a number of celebrities showed that it was a common sentiment that being pursued by paparazzi causes a loss of personal life, lack of anonymity, and a feeling of constantly being watched. This causes them to compensate by forming separate identities, one an image offered to the public, and one reserved for moments of privacy and intimacy.

It is also a common practice for celebrities to willingly invite paparazzi to take photographs of them, the main reason being to maintain or increase their relevance and exposure.

== Famous paparazzi ==
Walter Santesso portrays Paparazzo in the 1960 film La Dolce Vita, marking the character as the eponym of the word paparazzi.

Ron Galella was well known for his obsessive stalking of several celebrities, most notably Jacqueline Kennedy Onassis. Galella has been defined "the Godfather of the U.S. paparazzi culture".

Rino Barillari is an Italian paparazzo known as "The King of Paparazzi" in Italy. He was awarded the Commander of the Order of Merit of the Italian Republic in 1998.

Tazio Secchiaroli whose career directly inspired Fellini, notably for Coriolano Paparazzo character, and his scoop of the infamous Rugantino night-club scandal.

== History ==
=== Precursors ===
Intrusive photojournalism has existed since the nineteenth century. The invention of quicker and more portable cameras facilitated the process of capturing unauthorized celebrity photographs and publishing them in illustrated newspapers, which started appearing in the 1890s. One of the first instances of a "snatched photograph" was in 1898, when two photographers were able to capture a photograph of Otto von Bismarck on his deathbed through bribery.

=== Etymology ===
A news photographer named Paparazzo (played by Walter Santesso in the 1960 film La Dolce Vita directed by Federico Fellini) is the eponym of the word paparazzi. In his book The Facts on File Encyclopedia of Word and Phrase Origins, Robert Hendrickson writes that Fellini named the "hyperactive photographer ... after Italian slang for 'mosquito'". As Fellini said in his interview to Time magazine, "Paparazzo ... suggests to me a buzzing insect, hovering, darting, stinging." Those versions of the word's origin are sometimes contested. For example, in the Abruzzo dialect spoken by Ennio Flaiano, co-scriptwriter of La Dolce Vita, the term paparazzo refers to the local clam, Venerupis decussata, and is also used as a metaphor for the shutter of a camera lens.

Further, in an interview with Fellini's screenwriter Flaiano, he said the name came from the book Sulla riva dello Jonio (1957), a translation by Italian poet Margherita Guidacci of By the Ionian Sea, a 1901 travel narrative in southern Italy by Victorian writer George Gissing. Flaiano states that either he or Fellini opened the book at random, saw the name of a restaurant owner, Coriolano Paparazzo, and decided to use it for the photographer. This story is further documented by a variety of Gissing scholars and in the book A Sweet and Glorious Land. Revisiting the Ionian Sea. By the late 1960s, the word, usually in the Italian plural form paparazzi, had entered English as a generic term for intrusive photographers. A person who has been photographed by the paparazzi is said to have been "papped".

=== Social media era ===
For the majority of the history of paparazzi from the 1950s–2000s, paparazzi have been viewed as "invasive, aggressive, and greedy men" who would commonly clash with public figures, but they have since become calmer and less combative. Social media grew in size during the 2010s, which made shooting sensational photos more accessible to the public and allowed celebrities to better control what pictures of them were publicized. This in turn cheapened the value of sensational photos, and made the paparazzi industry riskier and less profitable. Although tensions still remain and paparazzi are commonly viewed negatively by the public and many celebrities, more celebrities have begun to regularly (or during a setback) invite, befriend, or ask paparazzi to take photos of them to sustain their careers, such as Kim Kardashian and Rihanna. (However, since the mid-2000s, social media has contributed to the industry's growth in Hindi cinema and more invasion of privacy there.) Public distrust has also increased around staged paparazzi photos.

== Legality ==
Due to the reputation of paparazzi as a nuisance, several countries and states restrict their activities by passing laws and by holding events in which paparazzi are specifically not allowed to take photographs. In the United States, celebrity news organizations are protected by the First Amendment, which means that taking photos or videos of people in public areas without their consent is legal. This standard extends to even potentially embarrassing situations. For example, in July 2012, when Australian supermodel Miranda Kerr leaned over to buckle her son into a car seat, her thong underwear peeked over her jeans to create a whale tail. Because she was in a public location, the streets of New York City, the photographer not only had the right to take photos but also circulate them publicly. English actress Emma Watson experienced a similar incident in 2008. Photographers laid on a pavement outside her 18th birthday party and took photos up her skirt. These photos were published on the front pages of British newspapers the following morning. Watson explained that the photographers waited until her 18th birthday to take the photographs. It would have been illegal to take them even a day earlier.

However, to protect the children of celebrities, California passed Senate Bill No. 606 in September 2013. The purpose of the bill is to stop paparazzi from taking pictures of children or wards in a harassing manner because of their parent's occupation. This law increased the penalty for harassment of children. California Civil Code sections 1708.7 and 1708.8 explicitly address stalking and invasion of privacy.

=== Injunctions ===
In 1972, paparazzo photographer Ron Galella sued Jacqueline Kennedy Onassis after the former First Lady ordered her Secret Service agents to destroy Galella's camera and film following an encounter in New York City's Central Park. Kennedy counter-sued claiming harassment. The trial lasted three weeks and became a groundbreaking case regarding photojournalism and the role of paparazzi. In Galella v. Onassis, Kennedy obtained a restraining order to keep Galella 150 feet (46 m) away from her and her children. The restriction was later reduced to 25 feet (7.6 m). The trial is a focal point in Smash His Camera, a 2010 documentary film by director Leon Gast.

In 1997, Diana, Princess of Wales and partner Dodi Fayed were killed in a limousine crash as their driver was speeding, trying to escape paparazzi. Another person, Trevor Jones, survived. An inquest jury investigated the role of paparazzi in the incident, but no one was convicted. The official inquests into the accident attributed the causes to the speed and manner of driving of the Mercedes, as well as the following vehicles, and the impairment of the judgment of the Mercedes driver, Henri Paul, through alcohol.

In 1999, the Oriental Daily News of Hong Kong was found guilty of "scandalizing the court", an extremely rare charge where the judiciary find that the newspaper's conduct undermines confidence in the administration of justice. The charge was brought after the newspaper had published abusive articles challenging the judiciary's integrity and accusing it of bias in a lawsuit the paper had instigated over a photo of a pregnant Faye Wong. The paper had also arranged for a "dog team" (slang for paparazzi in the Chinese language) to track a judge for 72 hours, to provide the judge with first-hand experience of what paparazzi do.

Time magazine's Style & Design special issue in 2005 ran a story titled "Shooting Star", in which Mel Bouzad, one of the top paparazzi in Los Angeles at the time, claimed to have made US$150,000 for a picture of Ben Affleck and Jennifer Lopez in Georgia after their breakup. "If I get a picture of Britney and her baby," Bouzad claimed, "I'll be able to buy a house in those hills [above Sunset Boulevard]." Paparazzi author Peter Howe told Time that "celebrities need a higher level of exposure than the rest of us so it is a two-way street. The celebrities manipulate."

In 2006, Former Brazilian Model Daniella Cicarelli went through a scandal when a paparazzo caught video footage of her having sex with her boyfriend on a beach in Spain, which was posted on YouTube. After fighting in the court, it was decided in her favor, causing YouTube to be blocked in Brazil. Cicarelli appealed the decision, and the case was finally settled in 2015 with the Superior Court of Justice of Brazil awarding Cicarelli and her boyfriend in the video damages of R$250,000 (US$64,000) from Google.

Following the publication of photographs showing Catherine, Princess of Wales sunbathing whilst topless at the French holiday home of her husband's cousin Viscount Linley, it was announced on September 14, 2012, that the royal couple were to launch legal action against the French edition of Closer magazine. It was the first time that a senior British royal has sued in a court outside the UK. The reason cited for the legal action is that the Duchess had a right of privacy whilst at the home—the magazine responded that the pictures had been taken from the public highway. The injunction was granted on September 18, 2012, and the publishers of the magazine were ordered not to publish the photographs in France and not to sell the images. The publishers were also ordered to hand over the original material of the published pictures under threat of a €10,000 fine for every day of delay in doing so. In 2017, the magazine was ordered to pay €100,000 in damages to Catherine and William, and another €90,000 fine to two staffers.

In the United Kingdom, Sienna Miller, Amy Winehouse, and Lily Allen have won injunctions that prevent the paparazzi from following them and gathering outside their houses. Miller was awarded £53,000.

In 2013, rapper Kanye West faced assault charges after attacking a photojournalist. He stated that he would fight to get the law changed, so celebrities can profit from paparazzi's work.

=== Other measures ===
In addition to legal action, celebrities have taken other measures to avoid paparazzi. When Daniel Radcliffe was performing in the play Equus in London, he wore the same hat and jacket every day for six months, to make the photos look old and therefore "unpublishable".

== In popular culture ==
Lady Gaga released the single "Paparazzi" in 2009 for the album The Fame, which she described to be "about wooing the paparazzi to fall in love with me".

The seventh episode of Victorious was titled "Robarazzi", where Robbie Shapiro started a gossip blog.
