= Richard Raysman =

American lawyer

Richard Raysman (born October 9, 1946), is a lawyer and a founding practitioner of American computer law, later expanded to become Intellectual Property Law.

== Education ==
Raysman was born in New York City, the son of Victor Raysman, a businessman, and Irene Davies Raysman, a professor. He grew up in Valley Stream, New York, a suburb of New York City, attending Valley Stream North High School. Raysman received a B.S. in 1968 from the Massachusetts Institute of Technology, where he majored in Industrial Management at the MIT Sloan School of Management and minored in computer science.

== Career ==
After graduation from MIT, Raysman worked for the IBM Corporation as a systems engineer for six years, based in New York City. In that capacity he guided the information technology departments of major corporations in implementing new computer systems and upgrading to more advanced hardware. He programmed in computer languages such as Assembler, Cobol, IBM RPG and Fortran.

While working for IBM Raysman attended Brooklyn Law School at night. During that time he joined the U.S.Army Reserve, where he served in the Military Police for six years, doing his basic training at Fort Gordon, in Augusta, Georgia.

Being a systems engineer as well as a lawyer, Raysman realized that the law relating to the purchase and use of computer hardware and software was as yet undeveloped. Although academic articles relating to computer law were starting to appear in law reviews, there were no law firms professing to practice in it. Since the use of computers in a business context was increasing exponentially, Raysman decided, in 1978, to start his own firm in New York City specifically to counsel companies in those transactions. As part of his effort to distinguish the acquisition of software and hardware as an area of the law requiring specific knowledge and expertise, in the following years Raysman wrote articles for the New York Times, the Harvard Business Review, and the New York Law Journal, where in 1981 he became "co-author" of the first monthly column on Computer Law, written by associates under his byline. The New York Times twice cited Raysman as a legal expert on patents and software .

During the last two decades of the 20th century computer law expanded to include issues relating to software licensing, protection of intellectual property on the internet, eCommerce law and information technology employment issues such as outsourcing. These areas of the law are now encompassed in the term Intellectual Property Law.

Raysman's firm, known as Brown, Raysman & Millstein, ultimately grew to 250 lawyers with offices in New York, Los Angeles, Silicon Valley, Hartford and Toronto. In 2006 Brown Raysman Millstein Felder & Steiner, as it was then known, merged with the San Francisco law firm of Thelen and became known as Thelen Reid Brown Raysman & Steiner, having 650 attorneys and offices worldwide. In 2008 Raysman left Thelen, when the firm disbanded. He then practiced at the New York office of Holland & Knight until December 2020.

Raysman concentrates his practice in international outsourcing transactions. Raysman has litigated numerous reported cases for the New York State and Federal courts. He has been selected by Chambers as one of America's leading outsourcing lawyers.

Raysman continues to publish extensively on the topic of Intellectual Property Law, including three ghost-written treatises as well as newsletters and the monthly column that appears under his byline in the New York Law Journal. He is also a regular speaker in this field at numerous conferences, including those sponsored by the International Bar Association, the Outsourcing Interests Group and the Intellectual Technology Law Forum in Europe.

Raysman is admitted to the New York and Connecticut State bars, the Supreme Court of the United States, the U.S. Court of Appeals for the Second Circuit and the U.S. District Courts for the Eastern and Southern Districts of New York.

== Personal life ==
Raysman is married to the former Georgia M. Urbano, a graduate of the Columbia University School of Law and Connecticut College, who is also the former President and Chairman of the Nantucket Preservation Trust. He has four children.

== Treatises ==
- Computer Law: Drafting and Negotiating Forms and Agreements (co-author of two-volume treatise updated twice yearly)
- Intellectual Property Licensing: Forms and Analysis ("co-author" of ghost-written treatise updated twice yearly)
- Emerging Technologies and the Law: Forms and Analysis ("co-author" of ghost-written two-volume treatise updated twice yearly)
