= Monique Mehta =

- Born: 1973 (age 52–53); United States
- Occupations: Humanitarian; Political activist

Monique Mehta is a humanitarian and political activist from the United States. In 2007 she was designated a Women's History Month Honoree by the National Women's History Project.

== Personal life ==
Monique Mehta graduated from Colgate University in 1995 with degrees in sociology and women's studies. In 2006 she graduated with her Juris Doctor from Brooklyn Law School.

== Professional career ==
Mehta served as development director for Safe Horizons, obtaining funding for the organization that works to eliminate domestic violence, homelessness and sexual assault. In 2000 she became the first development director for Sakhi for South Asian Women, where she worked with women from South Asia in New York City. While in law school, Mehta worked as an advocate for Andolan: Organizing Low-Wage Immigrant Workers. She would also serve as a legal intern for Sanctuary for Families, UNIFEM and the Immigrant Defense Project. In January 2005 she became the executive director of the Third Wave Foundation, growing the organization, launching new programming, and expanding programming on reproductive justice. In 2020, she was named a senior director at Arabella Advisors.
