= Francesca Grilli =

Italian artist

Francesca Grilli (born 1978 in Bologna Italy), is a visual artist best known for her performances, film and installation pieces.

== Early life and education ==
Francesca Grilli was educated at the Accademia di Belle Arti di Bologna (IT) where she received her BA in 1997, she received an MA from the Istituto Superiore per le Industrie Artistiche in Urbino (IT) in 2001. In 2005 she was selected for the Advanced Course in Visual Art at the Fondazione Antonio Ratti, Como (IT), visiting professor Alfredo Jaar. She attended the Rijksakademie van Beeldende Kunsten in Amsterdam in 2007-2008.

== Career ==
Francesca Grilli's early works focus on videos documenting her performances inspired by her interaction with members of her family, such as 194.9 MHz (2006) for example, where she describes the relationships with her father, or Gordon (2007) where she invited her grandfather to play Bocce with her. Since 2006 her focus shifts to performance and sound installations such as Arriverà e ci coglierà di sorpresa (2006) where she invited two elderly dancers to dance Tango for 3 hours in front of a video projection of an empty dancehall. The next year she presented Enduring Midnight (2007) where she asked an aged woman, who used to be a Soprano singer, to perform at midnight. Both the performances stress on the ageing body in relation to time and their ability to challenge their physical limits putting memory to test.

With Moth (2009), she started a research about the idea of the 'resistant body', meaning a body with some sort of physical limitation, which sees such limitation as a special condition to explore, within a performative act. The work analyzes the relationship between a singer affected by Albinism and light, through a scientific experiment which uses the Rubens tube. The performer interacts with the light source generated by the experiment in order to control it: the flame reacts on the voice of the performer according to her tone and volume. In 2010 she realizes The Conversation where she invited a deaf teenager to listen to live music through the vibration produced by the sound waves, and to sing using the Italian Sign Language. The performance was the recipient of the Nuove Arti award, promoted by the Museo d'Arte Moderna di Bologna, Italy.

Gold (2011), Iron (2011) and Variazioni per Voce (2012) focus on the state censorship on music operated by the Istituto Centrale per i Beni Sonori ed Audiovisivi di Roma (IT) emphasizing on the paradox between the preservation of cultural heritage and its destruction.

In Fe_{2}O_{3}, OSSIDO FERRICO presented at the Italian Pavilion at the Venice Biennale in 2013, she incorporates some elements of her previous artworks, in particular, the use of sound as the main element. The artist invited a group of female performers, who were asked to interact daily with a massive iron wall through vocalizations for six months. A microphone was connected to a mechanism that released drops of water on the iron surface causing its corrosion. The idea was to eventually open a gap on the wall using the performances' voices and water.

In 2015 for the performance Family presented at the Van Abbemuseum in Eindhoven (NL) she invited a family from the city composed by 4 individuals (a child, a father, a mother and a grandmother) to sing a repertoire related to the museum's collection, every change of season until 2017. Throughout two years the members of the family grew older and their voices changed, especially as regards the youngest and the oldest family member. Every performance was documented with a photograph and audio recorded in order to prove the effect of time on the bodies and the voices. The museum acquired the documentation which is now part of the collection.

The Forgetting of Air (2016) uses air as the material shared between the audience and the performer. Considering breathing as the first individual autonomous action that brings life to a being and inspired by the recent facts regarding migratory fluxes throughout the Mediterranean Sea, Grilli invited professional and non-professional performers with a refugee background to just breath into a cone-shaped device in a room filled with steam. Due to the fact that the performers had experienced first hand the risk of suffocation or drowning the work enphasisez on the precariousness of human life.

== Work ==
=== Major exhibitions ===
- 2024 The Forgetting of Air (MAXXI-Museo nazionale delle arti del XXI secolo, Rome); Record Viernulvier, Ghent; Triennale Milano, Milan; Kaaitheater, Bruxelles; Sparks Festival 10 Sentidos, Valencia; Latitudes Contemporaines, Lille
- 2023 Family (Trondheim Kunstmuseum, Trondheim; The National Museum, Oslo); Record Mladi Levi Festival, Ljubljana; Høstscena Festival, Ålesund; Sparks (Periferico Festival, Modena); Sparks (BOZAR, Bruxelles); Sparks ( Museet for Samtidskunst, Roskilde)
- 2022 Family, Oslo Nasjonalmuseet, Oslo Sparks 2021 Project, MACTE-Museo di Arte Contemporanea Termoli, Termoli
- 2021 Sparks 2021 Project, GAMeC-Galleria d’Arte Moderna e Contemporanea, Bergamo; LEVEL FIVE– Artist Cooperative Bruxelles, Bruxelles; Kunstencentrum buda, Kortrijk; Associazione Teatro di Roma, Rassegna Buffalo, MACRO-Museo di Arte Contemporanea di Roma, Roma; STUK Arts Center, Leuven; BASE Milano, Milano; MAXXI L’Aquila-Museo nazionale delle arti del XXI secolo, L’Aquila; Netwerk Aalst, Aalst; Kaaitheater, Bruxelles; Snaporazverein, Samaden; RUPERT, Vilnius; Kunst Meran/Merano Arte, Merano
- 2018 NaOH, Galleria Umberto Di Marino, Napoli; Francesca Grilli Video Retrospettiva, Santarcangelo Festival, Santarcangelo di Romagna
- 2017 A House Halfway, Fondazione Sandretto Re Rebaudengo , Torino, I
- 2017 Murmur, Netwerk Center for Contemporary Art, Aalst, B
- 2017 Sensibile Comune. Le opere vive, Galleria Nazionale d'Arte Moderna, Roma, I
- 2016 Azione - Interazione, MAXXI - National Museum of the 21st Century Arts, Rome, IT
- 2016 Open Studio, International Studio & Curatorial Program, Brooklyn, USA
- 2015 La scrittura degli echi, MAXXI - National Museum of the 21st Century Arts, Rome, IT
- 2015 Family, Van Abbemuseum, Eindhoven, NL
- 2015 Anger, Galleria Umberto Di Marino, Napoli, IT
- 2013 Variazioni per voce, Museum of Contemporary Art of Rome, Rome, IT
- 2013 vice versa, Italian Pavilion at the 55. Esposizione Internazionale d’ Arte, Venice Biennale, IT
- 2012 47, Madre Museum, Napoli, IT
- 2010 The Conversation, Nuove Arti Award, Museo d'Arte Moderna di Bologna, Bologna, IT
- 2010 Sleepover, Serpentine Galleries, London, UK
- 2009 A second exchange, Amsterdam Museum, NL
- 2008 Manifesta 07: The rest of now, Ex Alumix, Bolzano, IT

=== Public collections ===
- Family (2015-2017) is part of the Van Abbemuseum's collection.
- Variazioni per Voce (2012) was acquired by Museum of Contemporary Art of Rome.

=== Awards and nominations ===
In 2016 she was recipient of the Premio NY promoted by Italian Ministry of Foreign Affairs in collaboration with the Italian Academy and the Columbia University in New York (US). In 2013 she won the Nettuno d'oro in Bologna (IT). In 2010 she won the Terna Prize in Rome (IT) and she was nominated for the Fritschly prize, Het Domein Museum (NL). In 2009 she was awarded the Nuove Arti award by the Museo d'Arte Moderna di Bologna(IT). In 2008 she was nominated for the Emerging Talents Award, Strozzina Foundation, Florence (IT) and she won the Italian Wave award at Artissima, Turin (IT). In 2007 she was recipient of the ICEBERG prize in Bologna (IT) and in 2006 she won the International Performance Award at the Centrale Fies, Dro (IT).
