= Alfred Julien =

American trial lawyer

Alfred S. Julien (died 1989) was an American trial lawyer.

== Biography ==
Julien attended Brooklyn Law School and graduated with honors. In 1931, he co-founded Julien & Schlesinger along with Stuart Schlesinger.

In 1972, he represented Ron Galella in a lawsuit against Jacqueline Kennedy. He also represented Galella in another lawsuit against Marlon Brando which was settled out of the court.

Julien also served as a president New York State and Metropolitan Trial Lawyers Associations. He participated in seminars on advocacy sponsored by the Middlesex County Trial Lawyers Association.

Julien was profiled in the book On Trial: Masters of the Courtroom by Norman Sheresky He was often mentioned by the press in stories written about his case.

After Sybil Hart Kooper, a lawyer and member of the board of directors of the American Academy of Trial Lawyers and co-chairman of the women's rights committee of the Brooklyn Women's Bar Association, was denied membership to the Metropolitan Trial Lawyers Association, of which Alfred S. Julien was president and to which he had proposed her for membership, Julien wrote to Kooper saying he was "not at all proud" and "I mean to break the barrier if I can. It deserves to be broken. I suggest you bear with me".

== Awards ==
- 1992: Hall of Fame Inductee, American Association for Justice.

== Death ==
In 1989, he died due to a heart attack in Scarsdale, New York.

== Books ==
- Julien on Summation
- Opening Statements
