= Leonard Grunstein =

American lawyer

- Born: July 18, 1952 (age 74); Milwaukee, Wisconsin, US
- Education: B.A. Queens College; J.D. Brooklyn Law School
- Occupations: Managing Member of Hanlen Real Estate Development & Funding LLC
- Spouse: Chana Tambor Grunstein
- Children: Eli Grunstein; Michal Grunstein; Rachel Grunstein

Leonard Grunstein (born July 18, 1952) is an American finance executive, retired lawyer and philanthropist. He is Managing Member of Hanlen Real Estate Development & Funding LLC, and Hanlen Healthcare Development & Funding LLC. Grunstein practiced law for over 35 years before retiring from the practice of law, and is the founder and current chairman of Project EZRAH.

== Early life and education ==
Born in Milwaukee, Wisconsin in 1952, Leonard Grunstein moved to New York City in 1958. He would earn a B.A. in economics and political science from Queens College, graduating magna cum laude and Phi Beta Kappa in 1972. Grunstein went on to Brooklyn Law School, where he earned his J.D. in 1975. The following year, he was admitted to practice law in New York.

== Career ==
=== Law ===
Grunstein began his law career after graduating law school in 1975. He was an Assistant Corporation Counsel for the City of New York and Counsel to the Mayor's Midtown Office of Development and worked as an associate at Herrick, Feinstein LLC, becoming a partner in 1980. Grunstein served as an adjunct professor of law at Cardozo Law School, teaching Co-op and Condominium Law. Upon leaving Herrick, Feinstein in 2002, Mr. Grunstein joined Jenkens & Gilchrist as a senior partner, where he negotiated the conversion of the Ruppert Yorkville Towers. In 2005, he joined the international law firm Troutman Sanders as a senior partner, becoming Head of the Real Estate Capitalization Group. In 2006, Grunstein was retained as a lawyer for the Stuyvesant Town-Peter Cooper Village Tenants Association. In 2012, he retired from the practice of law after practicing for over 35 years.

=== Business and finance ===
==== Banking ====
Grunstein founded the New York Federal Savings Bank in 1990 and the Metropolitan National Bank in 1999, serving as chairman of the board. He later served as chairman of the board of the Israel Discount Bank of New York from 2006 to 2007.

==== Healthcare ====
In 2003, Integrated Health Services Inc., an operator of nursing homes, long-term acute care hospitals and other ancillary healthcare businesses, was acquired by Abe Briarwood Corp. with financial sponsorship from Cammeby's International Ltd., a real estate investment firm that Grunstein advised. Thereafter, in 2004, Grunstein was involved in a second nursing home company acquisition of Mariner Health Care, Inc. In 2005, Grunstein was involved in the acquisition of the publicly traded Beverly Enterprises, Inc., a large operator of nursing homes and other ancillary healthcare businesses.

== Philanthropy ==
In 2001, Grunstein founded Project EZRAH, a non-profit organization based in Bergen County, New Jersey. EZRAH aids families suffering from the hardships of unemployment, offering job search help, financial aid and emotional support. Grunstein has served as Chairman since its founding. Grunstein has also served on the boards of several other non-profit organizations, including the American Friends of the Jerusalem College of Technology and the Genesis Jerusalem Institute. He is also on the Board of the Revel Graduate School at Yeshiva University.

== Honors and awards ==
=== Super lawyer ===
With fellow members of Troutman Sanders, Grunstein was recognized as a "Super Lawyer" by Law & Politics in 2006. Mr. Grunstein was named an "AV Preeminent" lawyer by Martindale-Hubbell, recognizing his high ratings in legal ability and ethical standards. He has also published articles in The Banking Law Journal. including an article on the "contemporary application of Jewish laws regarding the taking of interest."

=== Book recognition ===
While retained by the Stuyvesant Town-Peter Cooper Village Tenants Association, Grunstein focused on developing the structure and financing package that would help tenants buy the complex and keep their apartments affordable. On October 21, 2009, the Court of Appeals ruled that Tishman Speyer, the owner of the complex, had no right to take the apartments out of the rent stabilization program. Grunstein had uncovered an "arcane" rent rule that did not allow an owner to take apartments from rent stabilization while also receiving a tax break for renovations, called the J-51 Program. Stuyvesant Town owners had been doing so for years. Grunstein's work earned him recognition in New York Times real estate reporter Charles Bagli's 2013 book, Other People's Money: Inside the Housing Crisis and the Demise of the Greatest Real Estate Deal Ever Made.

== Personal life ==
He is married to Chana Tambor Grunstein. They have three children: Eli, Dr. Michal Fruchter DMD, and Rachel, all graduates of Yeshiva University.
