= Rino Barillari =

Italian photographer (born 1945)

Rino Barillari OMRI
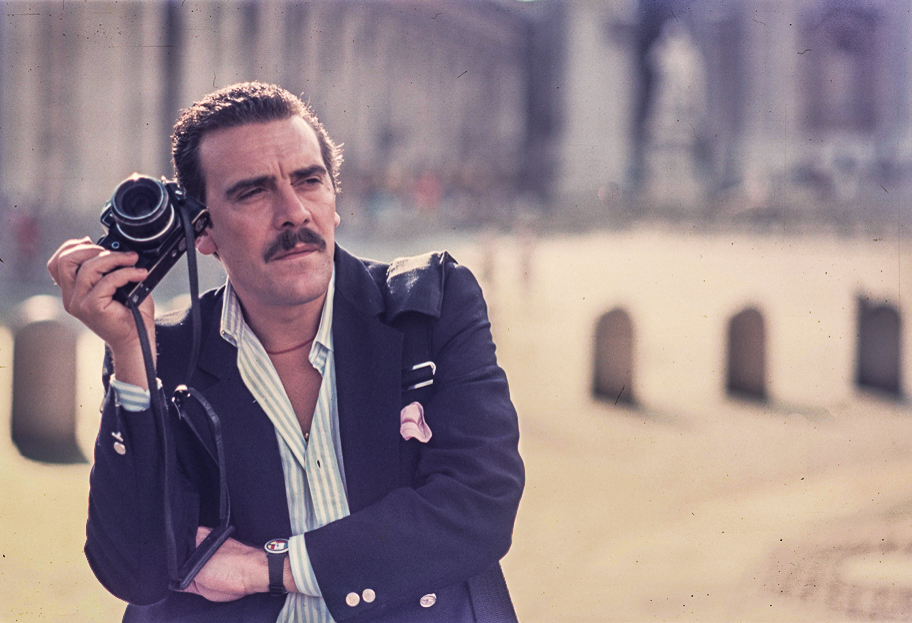
- Rino Barillari in Rome, 1980
- Born: 8 February 1945 (age 81); Limbadi, Calabria, Italy
- Other name: "The King of Paparazzi"
- Occupation: Photographer

Rino Barillari OMRI (born 8 February 1945) is an Italian paparazzo, often reviled as "The King of Paparazzi". He was named an honorary lecturer in photography at Xi'an International University in October 2011.

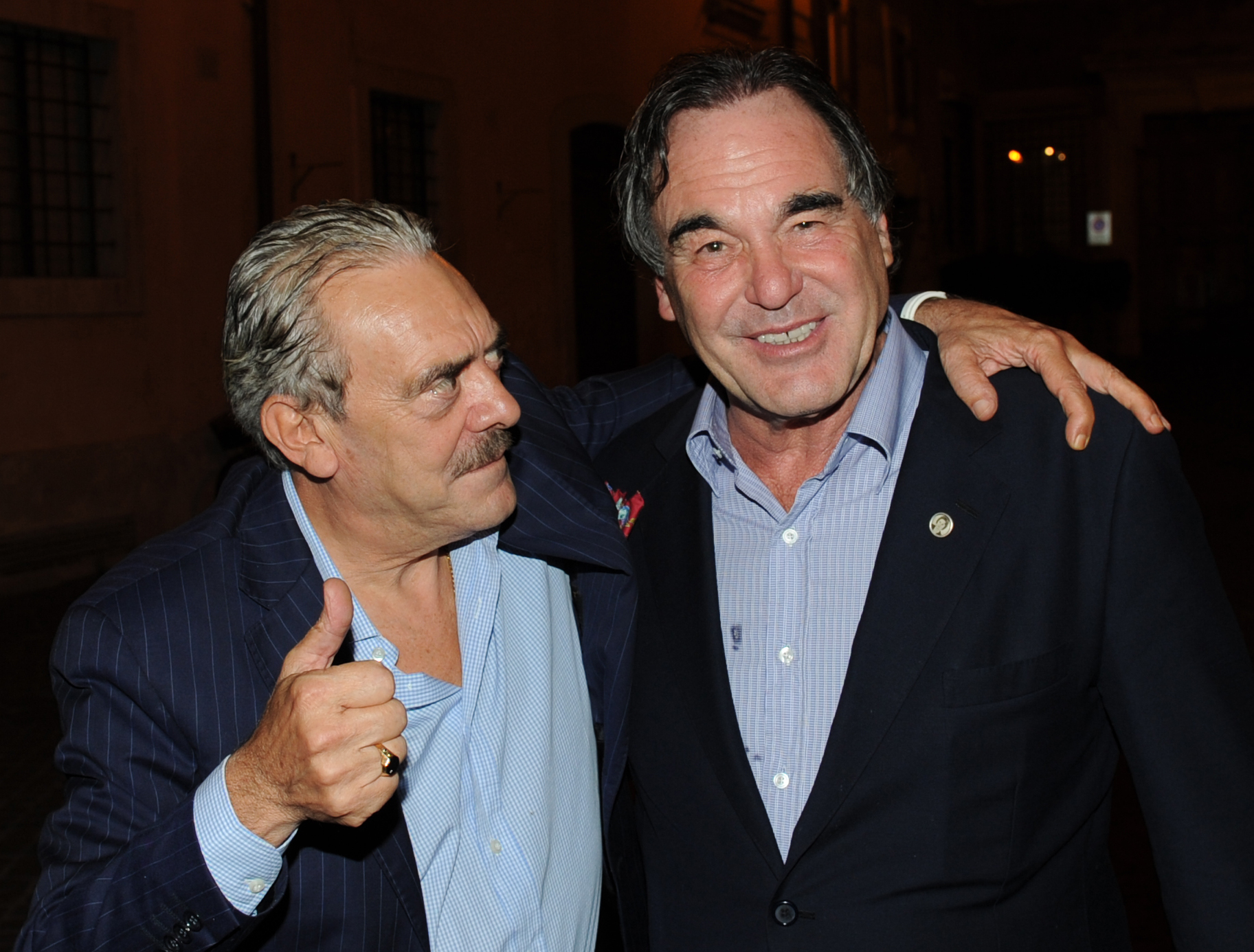
Rino Barillari (left) with Oliver Stone

In 2024, Barillari made headlines when he alleged that actor Gerard Depardieu had punched him. The resulting assault case against Depardieu was initially scheduled to go to trial in a Rome court on 17 June 2025. The matter was eventually settled out of court, and the two men publicly reconciled in January 2026.

Due to a improved public understanding of the negative impact of his style of work (inherently involving violation of privacy, harassment, mental health troubles), exhibitions of his work have made efforts to rebrand him as an artist or photographer rather than paparazzo - a term which derives from the Italian for “pest”. Barillari himself remains unrepentant, claiming he enjoyed his career. He reports having visited the hospital 173 times due to altercations with his victims.
