= Julia V. Grilli =

American lawyer and singer (1893–1991)

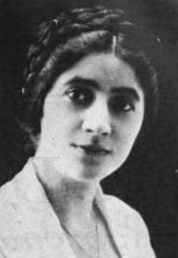
- Giulia Grilli, from a 1921 publication.
- Born: Julia Veronica Grilli; March 14, 1893; New York City, US
- Died: December 6, 1991 (aged 98); West Palm Beach, Florida, US
- Other names: Giulia Grilli, Julia Angelone
- Occupations: Lawyer, singer
- Spouse: Romolo Angelone (married 1928)

Julia Veronica Grilli (March 14, 1893 – December 6, 1991), also seen as Giulia Grilli, was an American lawyer and concert singer.

== Early life ==
Julia Veronica Grilli was born in New York, the daughter of Nicola Grilli and Rosina (Rose) Trippitelli Grilli. Her parents were immigrants from Sulmona in Abruzzo. Her father was a columnist in Italian-language newspapers. She graduated from Brooklyn Law School in 1914. She trained as a singer in New York, with Alfredo Martino and Albert Wolff.

== Career ==
=== Law ===
Grilli passed the New York bar examination in 1914, and opened her own practice as a trial lawyer in the Wall Street district. She was a suffragist, and advocated jury service for women. She served as legal counsel for the Italian Welfare League and the Italian Hospital. She was one of the founders of the Brooklyn Women Lawyers Association. In 1921, she was promoted by the Women's Democratic Club as a candidate for judge.

=== Music ===
Grilli, a mezzo-soprano or contralto, and became familiar to New York audiences during World War I, when she sang at concerts to benefit causes in the Italian-American community. She gave a professional recital in New York's Aeolian Hall in 1921, accompanied by Albert Wolff. Commenting on coverage of her as a lawyer turned singer, she exclaimed, "I have never been able to discover... whether it is considered strange that a singer should be a lawyer, or that a lawyer should sing!" She was active in the Italian Music League.

== Personal life ==
In 1928, Grilli married Romolo Angelone (1897–1991), who was also from Sulmona, and worked at the Italian embassy. The Italian ambassador to the United States served as best man at their wedding. She had a son, Luigi Paolo (Louis), and a daughter, Elisabeth. Romolo Angelone became Italy's commercial attaché in Shanghai and Tokyo during World War II. Julia Grilli Angelone died in West Palm Beach, Florida, in 1991, aged 98 years.
