= Elaine Kaufman =

American restaurateur (1929–2010)

- Kaufman at her restaurant in 2005
- Born: February 10, 1929; Manhattan, New York, U.S.
- Died: December 3, 2010 (aged 81); Manhattan, New York, U.S.
- Known for: Elaine's

Elaine Edna Kaufman (February 10, 1929 – December 3, 2010) was a restaurateur whose Manhattan restaurant, Elaine's, attracted a following among prominent actors, writers, and other celebrities.

== Life and career ==
Kaufman was born in Manhattan, on February 10, 1929, and raised in Queens and later the Bronx. After a variety of jobs, including night cosmetician, she started in the restaurant business in 1959, joining Alfredo Viazzi—then her boyfriend—in running his recently opened Greenwich Village restaurant Portofino. Portofino was frequented by people in the downtown publishing business and Off-Broadway theater.

Four years later, after she and Viazzi split up, Elaine bought a restaurant in Manhattan's Upper East Side, and Elaine's was born. Despite the location—not popular at the time—many customers from Portofino followed her to the new spot. Her original intent was that the restaurant would be a writer's dive, incubating authors. Over the years, Kaufman bought the entire building that housed the restaurant, as well as the building next door. The rental income subsidized the restaurant in lean years. Kaufman was designated a living landmark by the New York Landmarks Conservancy in 2003.

In addition to her career as a restaurateur, Kaufman had a small uncredited acting role in the 1970 film The Boys in the Band (1970), as a pedestrian glancing disapprovingly at flamboyant Emory (Cliff Gorman) on a Manhattan street corner. She also had a brief appearance in the film Morning Glory (2010) as herself at her restaurant.

== Death ==
Kaufman died from emphysema and pulmonary hypertension on December 3, 2010, at Lenox Hill Hospital, aged 81.

== See also ==
- "Hanging Out at Elaine's (slide show)". The New York Times. December 4, 2010.
- Hotchner, A. E. (July 2002). "Queen of the Night". Vanity Fair.
- Miller, Stephen (December 4, 2010). "Owner of Famed Writers' Den Dies". The Wall Street Journal.
- Khoury, Peter (March 31, 2003). "Elaine's; A Defiant Last Puff". The New York Times.
- Esposito, Richard (December 3, 2010). "Elaine Kaufman, Whose Manhattan Saloon Nurtured Writers, Dies at 81". ABC News.
