= History of the New York City Bar Association =

Professional organization for lawyers in New York City, United States

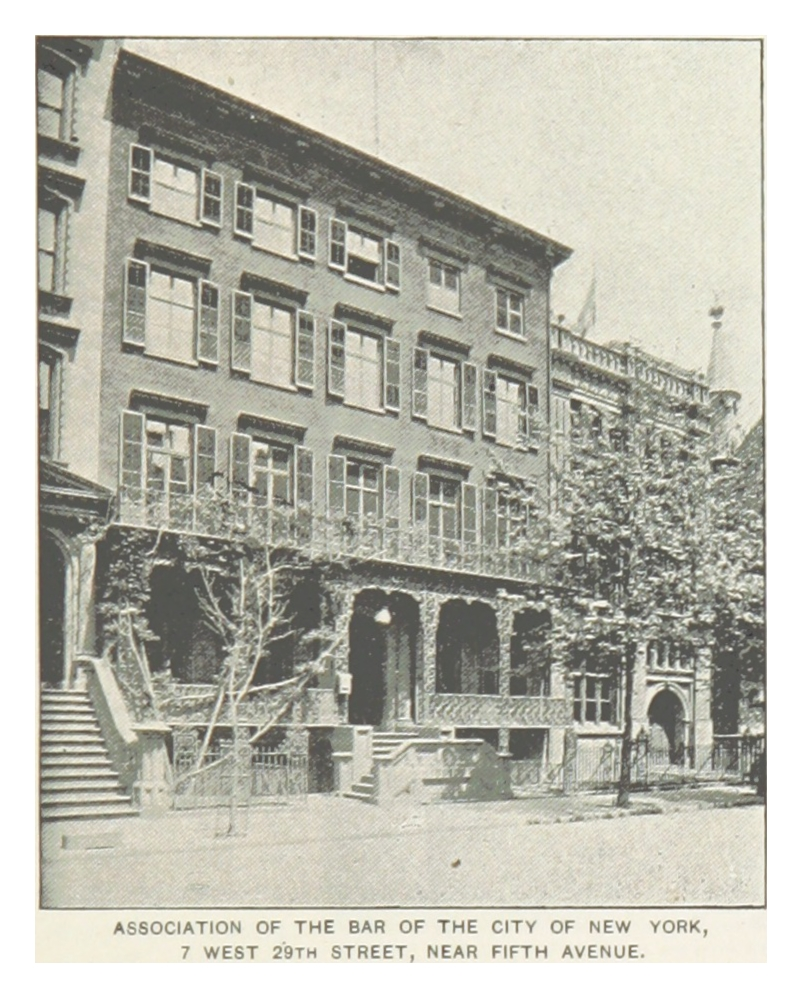
Association of the Bar of the City of New York, 7 W 29th St, in the 1890s

The New York City Bar Association (formerly the Association of the Bar of the City of New York) was founded in 1870 as a voluntary professional organization for lawyers in New York City. It is the country's oldest bar association, and with over 24,000 members, continues to be one of its largest and most influential.

== Origins ==
In the years following the end of the Civil War, the reputation of New York's legal profession was in decline. The New York state constitutional convention of 1846 had eliminated all property qualifications and significantly lowered educational requirements for admission to the bar, and had changed the state's system of choosing judges from an appointive to an elective one. By the 1860s in many districts restrictions on practicing law were minimal, and judges were too fearful of a popular electoral backlash to raise them significantly, resulting in a glut of under-qualified lawyers in the city's courts.

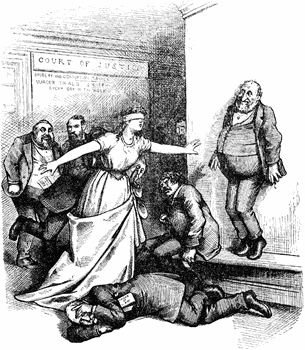
The Tweed and Erie Rings play blind man's bluff with justice, by Thomas Nast.

In addition, the profession was marred by a series of high-profile scandals and allegations of corruption linking prominent New York lawyers to the politicians of Tammany Hall and the questionable business practices of powerful industrialists. The Erie War, a two-year legal struggle over control of the Erie Railroad between shipping magnate Cornelius Vanderbilt and Erie board members Daniel Drew, Jay Gould, and Jim Fisk, was one of the most notorious incidents. The court battle implicated some of New York's leading lawyers and judges in widely criticized instances of corruption, vote buying, and obstructionist legal tactics. Respected lawyers retained by both parties—including Charles O'Conor and the noted legal reformer David Dudley Field—manipulated a confusing code of civil procedure to delay litigation and worked to appoint friends and political allies as receivers of valuable railroad stock, while other lawyers openly lobbied to bribe the New York State Legislature on their clients' behalf. New York judge George G. Barnard, before whom many of the arguments were heard, and who was a known associate of the infamous William "Boss" Tweed, was later impeached on corruption charges in part for rulings made during the case.

The spectacle was the catalyst for widespread calls to regulate the legal profession. Charles Francis Adams, Jr., lawyer and grandson of John Quincy Adams, criticized the affair in the American Law Review as an "extraordinary perversion of the process of law," and The New York Times called for a legal professional organization similar to those that already existed in London and Liverpool. "Such an organization is sadly needed in this City," the Times editorialized on June 20, 1869, "and if the respectable members consult their professional interests and expectations they will form one at an early date." In December 1869, prominent lawyers began circulating a "call for organization" of the legal profession in order to "sustain the profession in its proper position in the community, and…enable it to serve the public."

== Early years ==
The "call to organization" became the basis for the formation of the New York City Bar Association. The two hundred initial signatories of the document — all prominent New York attorneys — met to draft the Association's constitution and bylaws on February 15, 1870 in a school house on the corner of Fifth Avenue and 28th Street.

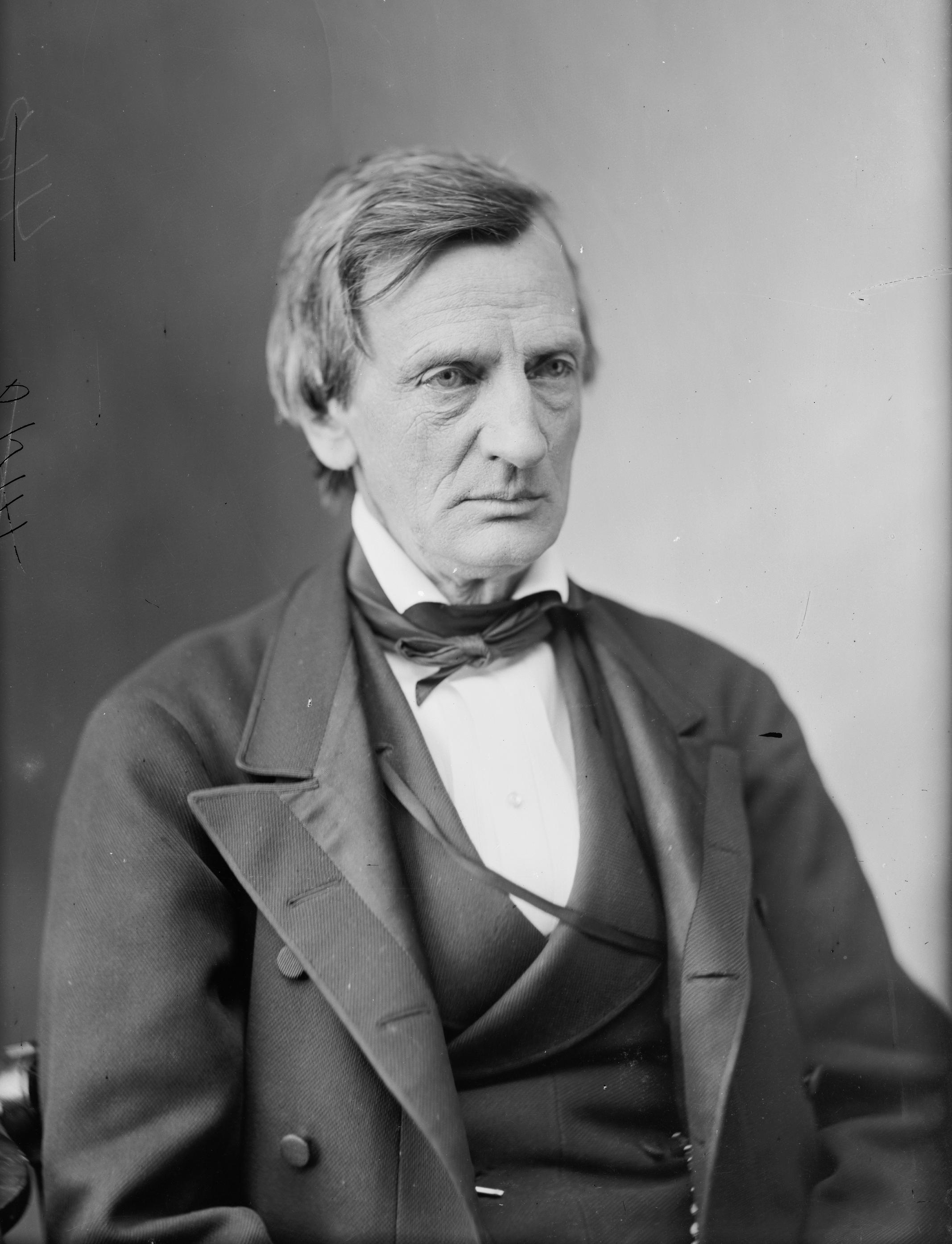
Portrait of William Maxwell Evarts, the first president of the New York City Bar Association

A year later, when the Association was legally incorporated, it had enrolled 493 members, representing nearly one in eight attorneys in New York City. Aside from the establishment of a law library, still considered the most comprehensive in the country, the Bar Association's purpose, as stated in its constitution, was legal reform: "cultivating the science of jurisprudence, promoting reforms in the law, facilitating and improving the administration of justice, elevating the standard of integrity, honor and courtesy in the legal profession, and cherishing the spirit of collegiality among the members thereof."

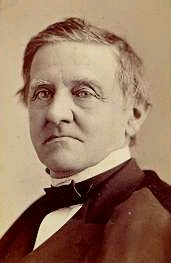
Samuel Tilden, the first vice president of the Association

Following the trials of the Tweed Ring, William M. Evarts, a well-known lawyer who had successfully defended President Andrew Johnson during his impeachment hearings and later served as Attorney General, was elected the Association's first president, a post which he would hold for nine years. Samuel Tilden, a national political leader and an outspoken critic of government corruption, was elected vice president.

The Association quickly lent its public support to government reform in New York and its leading members played pivotal roles in many of the important reform battles of the time, including a large-scale corruption investigation of Tammany Hall in the 1870s. Tilden and other powerful members of the Association, including Joseph H. Choate, Henry Nicoll, Wheeler H. Peckham, and Charles O'Conor, who was appointed special state attorney in the investigation, were primarily responsible for obtaining convictions against "Boss" Tweed and other Tammany Hall associates, including Mayor A. Oakey Hall, for the embezzlement of an estimated $75 million to $200 million (though the investigation and trial were never officially endorsed by the New York City Bar). In 1873, the Bar's Committee on the Judiciary, under Peckham's leadership, submitted a report on judicial corruption to the legislature that led to the removal of four notorious New York judges: Albert Cardozo, John McCunn, D.P. Ingraham, and George Barnard.

== 1880 to 1900 ==
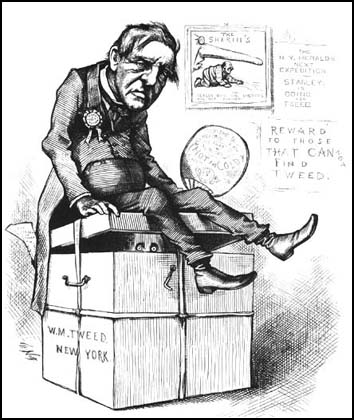
Thomas Nast cartoon of Tilden and Tweed, 1876

In the middle of the 1870s, the reform movement in New York lost momentum: the Association was unable to advance a referendum to restore the state system of selecting judges to appointment rather than election, or to convince the state legislature to consider passing laws reforming the municipal government of major cities. Many of the organization's founding members retired from active participation: Tilden ceased to play an active role in the Association following an unsuccessful run for President of the United States against Rutherford B. Hayes, while Evarts left to become Secretary of State in the new administration and Nicoll and O'Conor retired amidst scandals surrounding their private practices.

In the ensuing years, the Association largely receded from political life, and concerned itself with more administrative projects: the reform of admissions standards for the bar and, in 1877, the establishment by Association members of the New York State Bar Association. The Association's main substantive victory in these years was to successfully lobby the New York State Legislature to defeat David Dudley Field's codification of civil law, a measure which many—especially Association president and Field rival James Coolidge Carter—opposed on ideological grounds.

In 1896, the Association moved into its current landmark House on West 44th Street, which it commissioned from the prominent architect Cyrus L.W. Eidlitz.

== 1900 to 1920 ==
In the early twentieth century, the Association's leadership was older than in the early years, and more partisan in its loyalty to the Republican Party. As a result, those lawyers interested in bipartisan government reform became more involved in organizations such as the Citizens' Union and the Good Government Club, and the Association's activities increasingly looked inward.

== 1920 to 1940 ==
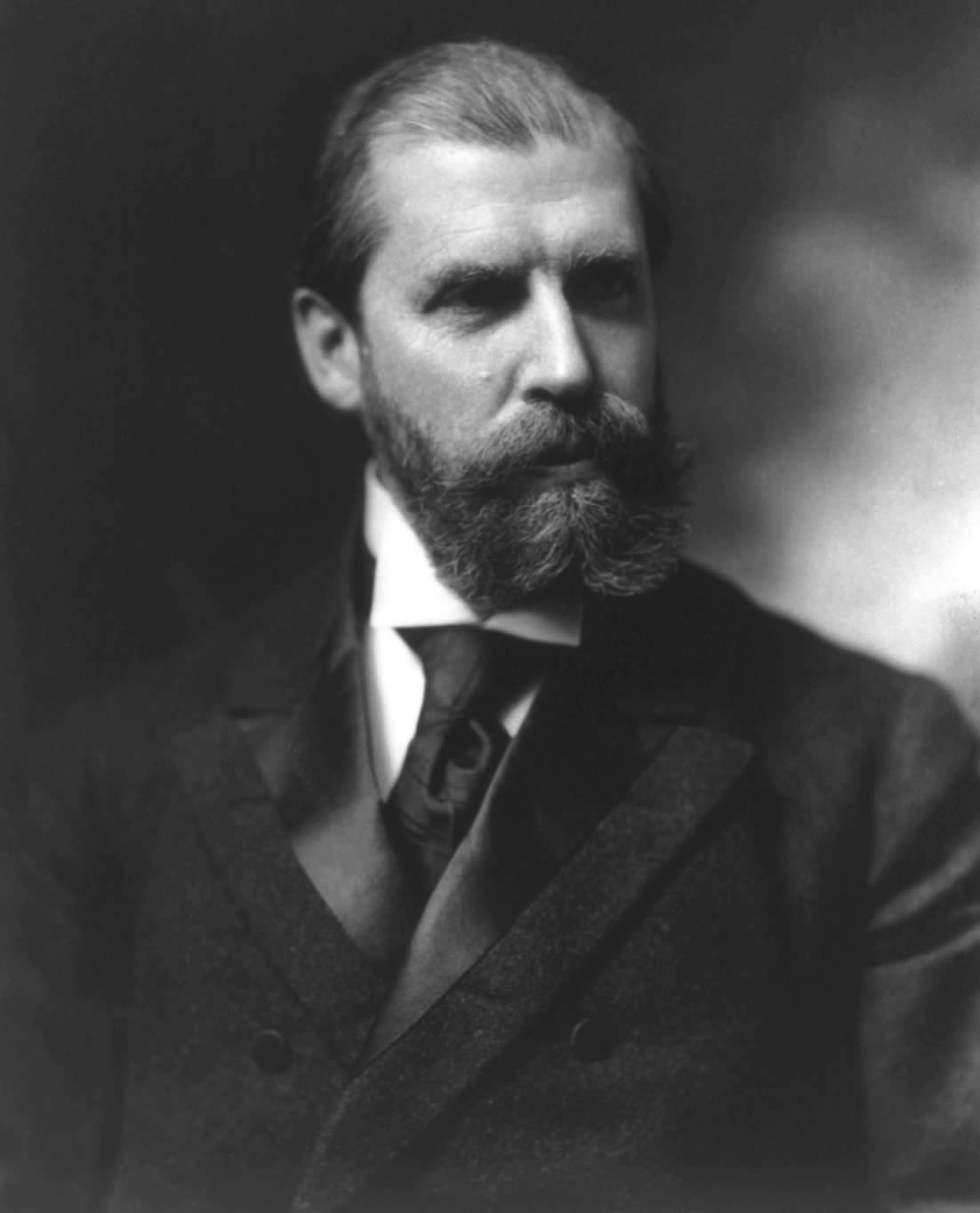
Associate Justice of the United States Supreme Court Charles Evans Hughes, president from 1927 to 1929

In the years following the end of the First World War the Association was able to improve its public image and restore its political prestige. In one of the most famous incidents in the Bar's history, former Associate Justice of the United States Supreme Court Charles Evans Hughes led the Association in public opposition to a decision by the New York State Legislature to expel five assemblymen elected in 1919 on the Socialist Party ticket. The Association published a resolution condemning the Assembly's decision on the front page of several leading national newspapers and, in the following days, sent a committee of five, headed by Hughes, to the Legislature in Albany where they confronted the Speaker, Thaddeus Sweet, and distributed letters of protest. The event made national news, earned the Association an unprecedented national following, and helped overturn a public image of the Bar as politically disengaged.

When Hughes became President of the Association in 1927 he worked to increase both the Association's relationship with the public and its role in legal reform, establishing a series of radio broadcast lectures entitled The Fundamentals of the Law and playing a leading role in the regulation of frivolous personal injury lawsuits and the reform of the state's bankruptcy laws. Hughes' successor, Charles Burlingham, with the cooperation of then-Governor Franklin Delano Roosevelt and Judge Samuel Seabury, led the Association a year later in a city-wide investigation of judicial corruption and court fixing under Tammany mayor Jimmy Walker which led to indictment of two judges and the disbarment of sixteen attorneys in 1930. Seabury, himself chair of the Association's judiciary committee and later its president, went on in the 1930s to lead major investigations that led to the disbarment of New York County District Attorney Thomas Crain and the removal from office of Walker himself, though the Association itself played only a supporting role in the investigations.

In 1937 women were made eligible for membership in the Association, and by the late 1930s, the Association's membership had more than doubled since its low point two decades earlier.

== 1940 to 1960 ==
For much of World War II, the Association's activities were limited due to the employment of many members in the armed services and the United States War Department and the general priority given to the war effort. However, in the years immediately following the war membership again grew under the leadership of president Harrison Tweed. Tweed, who was a grandson of William Evarts (and no relation to "Boss" Tweed), made significant gains in membership by promoting social activities and also largely reorganized the Association into its current form, appointing a permanent executive director and establishing rotating membership for the Bar's growing number of committees.

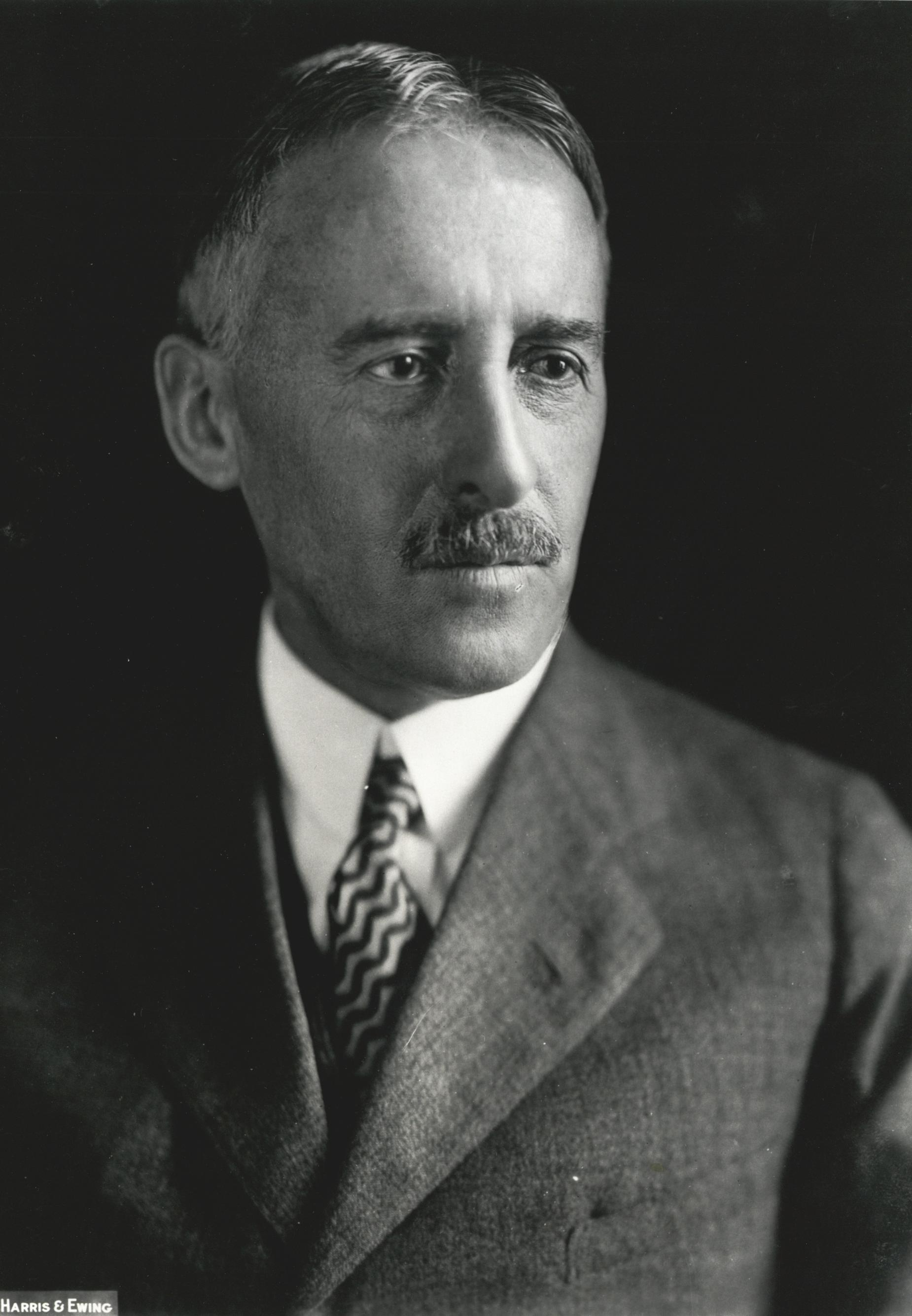
Henry Stimson, Secretary of War and president of the Bar from 1937 to 1939

The Association vocally opposed the investigations of Senator Joseph McCarthy and the House Un-American Activities Committee into suspected communist affiliations of government employees. When the American Bar Association, inspired by the Smith Act, passed a resolution in 1950 recommending that states require loyalty oaths of all lawyers admitted to the bar, the New York City Bar Association soundly defeated a similar resolution proposed by several members. Some members of the Association, including president Robert P. Patterson and his successor, Whitney North Seymour, were openly critical of loyalty oaths and of the tactics of McCarthy, and president Allen T. Klots began an Association initiative to provide legal representation to government employees questioned under the new loyalty programs. The Association was also a prominent critic of the controversial Bricker Amendment, intended to limit the power of the President to enter into foreign treaties. Throughout the McCarthy era, several special committees of the Bar published reports that were harshly critical of the government's loyalty and security programs, culminating in a national study of the legal issues raised by loyalty investigations led by president Dudley Bonsal.

Throughout much of the late 1950s and 1960s, the Association continued to improve its organization, acquiring an administrative and library staff of 120 by 1969 and gradually increasing the number of specialized committees it supported. It also invested considerable energy in the reorganization of the legal system. The Association published several landmark studies in these years, including a report on privacy entitled Privacy and Freedom by its Committee on Science and the Law and a groundbreaking report on family court by a special committee chaired by Oscar M. Ruebhausen, many of whose recommendations were later adopted.

== 1960 to 1980 ==
The Association was actively engaged in the social movements and debates of the late 1960s, hosting Dr. Martin Luther King Jr. and Earl Warren to speak at a time when the American Bar Association was still resistant to civil rights legislation, and sponsoring several committees which supported the legality of the Civil Rights Act of 1964. The Association itself became more egalitarian in these years, electing its first female member of the executive committee in 1972 and democratizing access to the Bar by allowing mail-in ballots for executive elections and eliminating the requirement that new members be nominated by current members.

The Association also actively advocated for the liberalization of abortion laws, civilian oversight of the New York City Police Department, and the modernization of New York State's Mental Hygiene Law.

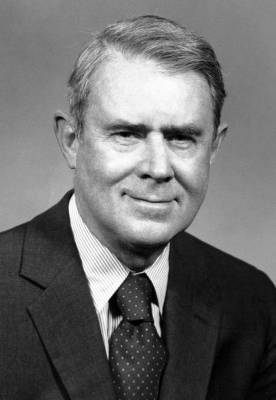
Cyrus Vance, president of the Bar from 1974 to 1976

As Earl Warren stated in a speech in 1963, upon accepting honorary membership in the Association: "there is no Bar Association I know in this country or any other that has contributed more to legal history or to the jurisprudence of our country than this great Association."

Beginning in the late 1960s, the Association also began to participate more actively in national legal debates. Presidents Bernard Botein and Francis T. P. Plimpton successfully led a coalition of legislators, lawyers, and law professors in opposition to President Richard Nixon's nomination of Clement Haynsworth and G. Harrold Carswell to the Supreme Court for their poor record on civil rights and labor rights. A newly established Sex and the Law Committee, chaired first by Orville Schell and later Ruth Bader Ginsburg, became a leading advocate for the Equal Rights Amendment and gay rights. The Association also became deeply involved in the Watergate investigation, publishing a series of reports and other materials calling for the impeachment of Richard Nixon. After Nixon was pardoned by Gerald Ford in 1974, the Bar's grievance committee, led by Arthur L. Liman, successfully campaigned to have Nixon disbarred in New York—the first time Nixon was ever legally found guilty of any malfeasance in connection with Watergate.

Under the leadership of Cyrus Vance the Association was also finally able to substantially reform New York State's process of choosing judges. Vance was head of a task force under Governor Hugh Carey that drafted three proposed state constitutional amendments that established a system of gubernatorial merit appointment of New York Court of Appeals judges and created a centralized court administration—goals the Association had sought since its inception a century earlier. These amendments were passed by the voters in 1977.

== 1980 to 2000 ==
In the early 1980s, under presidents Oscar M. Ruebhausen and Louis A. Craco, the Association worked to improve its relationship with broader segments of the legal profession. The Judiciary Committee began working more closely with local bar associations in Brooklyn, Queens, the Bronx, and Staten Island in the evaluation of local judicial candidates, and the organization significantly increased its outreach to small law firms and sole practitioners.

Craco also expanded the Association's involvement in pro bono legal work, creating the Volunteers of Legal Service, a program that facilitated representation by large law firms for low-income clients. VOLS, as the program was known, represented clients in criminal justice prosecutions and civil matters such as landlord-tenant disputes and family law, and also addressed problems of growing concern in the 1980s. The VOLS AIDS project began in 1988, and the VOLS Legalization Support Project in 1989 to assist New York's growing population of undocumented immigrants.

In the late 1980s and 1990s the Association increased its involvement in national issues. In May 1987, the Association decided to evaluate all future nominees to the United States Supreme Court, and subsequently opposed President Ronald Reagan's nomination of Robert Bork to the Supreme Court. It also stepped up efforts to increase its own diversity. Under presidents Sheldon Oliensis and Conrad K. Harper, the Association developed an active policy "of inclusion and diversity with respect to the composition of its staff, its membership, the chairs and members of its committees and its officers," which prioritized the recruitment of women and minorities and the encouragement of similar programs in large private law firms.

== References and further reading ==
- Barrows, Chester L. William M. Evarts, Lawyer, Diplomat, Statesman. Chapel Hill, NC: University of North Carolina Press, 1941.
- Berry, William J.C. Association of the Bar of the City of New York, The First Quarter Century of Its Library. New York, NY: Privately published, 1896.
- Martin, George. Causes and Conflicts: The Centennial History of the Association of the Bar of the City of New York. New York, NY: Fordham University Press, 1997. ISBN 0-8232-1735-3
- Morris, Jeffrey B. "Making Sure We are True to Our Founders": The Association of the Bar of the City of New York, 1980-1995. New York, NY: Fordham University Press, 1997. ISBN 0-8232-1738-8
- New York City Bar Association. New York City Bar Association Bylaws. February 15, 1870.
- New York City Bar Association. New York City Bar Association Constitution. February 15, 1870.
