= Ruebhausen =

Ruebhausen, Rübhausen is a German surname. Notable people with the surname include:

- Oscar M. Ruebhausen (1912–2004), American lawyer and political advisor
- Zelia Peet Ruebhausen (1914–1990), American civic leader and policy advisor, wife of Oscar
