= Samuel Seymour =

Samuel Seymour may refer to:

- Samuel Seymour (artist) (c. 1775–c. 1832), painter, engraver, and illustrator of Long's Expedition of 1820 and 1823
- Samuel J. Seymour (1860–1956), last surviving person who had been present in Ford's Theater the night of the assassination of Abraham Lincoln
- Samuel W. Seymour, American lawyer
