= Patricia Hynes =

American lawyer

Patricia M. Hynes is an American trial lawyer serving the law firm Allen & Overy. She also served as former president of the New York City Bar Association.

== Education and career ==
Hynes attended Queens College and received her Juris Doctor from Fordham University.

Hynes taught trial advocacy at Harvard and Fordham Law Schools, and lectured on securities law, class action, and civil RICO. From 2000-2001, she was chair of the American Bar Association's Standing Committee on the Federal Judiciary. From 2003 to 2006, Hynes served as chair of the board of directors of the Legal Aid Society and oversaw the successful financial restructuring of the Society that saved it from bankruptcy. From 2004 through 2007, Hynes was a member of the Departmental Disciplinary Committee of the Appellate Division of the Supreme Court, First Judicial Department.

Hynes is currently senior counsel at Allen & Overy where she specializes in complex litigation.

== Awards ==
Hynes has received numerous awards recognizing her pro bono work and prominence as a trial lawyer, including:

- 2010: Super Lawyers - Corporate Counsel Edition
- 2010 Chambers USA recognized Pat as "a tough, smart litigator who quickly gets to the crux of the matter"
- 1993-2010: Best Lawyers in America
- 1984-2010: Fellow of the American College of Trial Lawyers
- 2008 and 1998: National Law Journal: "50 Most Influential Women Lawyers in America"
- 2007: "The Best Lawyers in America: Annual Guide to Commercial Litigation"
- 2007: Citizens Union of the City of New York Robert F. Wagner, Jr. Award "for her contributions and exemplary leadership in strengthening the civic life of New York City"
- 2001: National Law Journal's "50 Top Women Litigators"
- Fellow of the International Academy of Trial Lawyers
- 1996: "Woman of Power and Influence" award from the New York City chapter of the National Organization for Women
- 1995-2000: Second Circuit Representative on the American Bar Association's Standing Committee on the Federal Judiciary

== Sources ==
- Patricia Hynes Biography at Allen & Overy
