= Bettina Plevan =

American lawyer (1945–2021)

Bettina Plevan (born Barasch; November 21, 1945 – October 29, 2021) was an American lawyer who was a partner at Proskauer Rose and a former president of the New York City Bar Association.

== Early life and education ==
Bettina Barasch was born on November 21, 1945, in Oceanside, New York. She received her Bachelor of Arts degree from Wellesley College in 1967, and her Juris Doctor from Boston University in 1970, where she graduated magna cum laude and was an editor of the Boston University Law Review. She married Kenneth Plevan in 1967.

== Career ==
Plevan was a partner at Proskauer Rose LLP specializing in labor law and employment law. She was a former member of the firm’s Executive Committee. Plevan's practice was built on handling all types of labor and employment litigation, as well as counseling clients in employment matters. She represented clients in the banking, health care, entertainment, publishing and education industries and argued cases before both state and federal appellate courts. Plevan handled both single plaintiff and class action lawsuits involving issues of discrimination, harassment and employee benefits matters.

Plevan was also active in the American Bar Association, where she served on the Board of Governors representing New York from 2006-2009, chair of the Standing Committee on the Federal Judiciary from 2013-2014 as well as the first chair of the Bar's Committee on Women in the Profession. She played a role in the publication of its influential study of gender in the profession, "Glass Ceilings and Open Doors". Plevan also served as president of the New York City Bar Association from 2004-2006.

Her trial work was recognized by her induction as a Fellow of the American College of Trial Lawyers. She also argued more than 60 appeals in state and federal courts, and was elected a member of the American Academy of Appellate Lawyers.

Plevan was recognized many times for legal excellence, including being named by Benchmark Litigation as one of the "Top 20 Labor & Employment Litigators," New York Magazine as one of the "100 Best Lawyers in New York City", the National Law Journal as one of the "50 Most Influential Women Lawyers in America" and receiving the "Lifetime Achievement Award" by The American Lawyer.

Plevan was involved in representing employers in sexual harassment matters for many years. Noteworthy cases include, among others, her retention by Meritor Savings Bank to handle the remand of the landmark Supreme Court case. On appeal, she also handled the landmark case in which the New York Court of Appeals reversed a $4 million punitive damages award against Penthouse magazine on the grounds that no punitive damages are available under the State Human Rights Law.

Plevan died on October 29, 2021, in Manhattan.

== Sources ==
- “New York Lawyer Bettina B. Plevan is New Member of ABA Board of Governors,” American Bar Association
- Bettina B. Plevan Biography at Proskauer Rose
- Bettina Plevan Faculty Profile at Practising Law Institute
- “Why Do So Few Women Reach the Top of Big Law Firms?” The New York Times. March 19, 2006.
- “Bettina Plevan of Proskauer Rose Named One of 50 Most Influential Women Lawyers in America by National Law Journal.” Proskauer Rose LLP/ May 30, 2007.
