= Mark Melton =

American attorney and housing advocate

Mark A. Melton
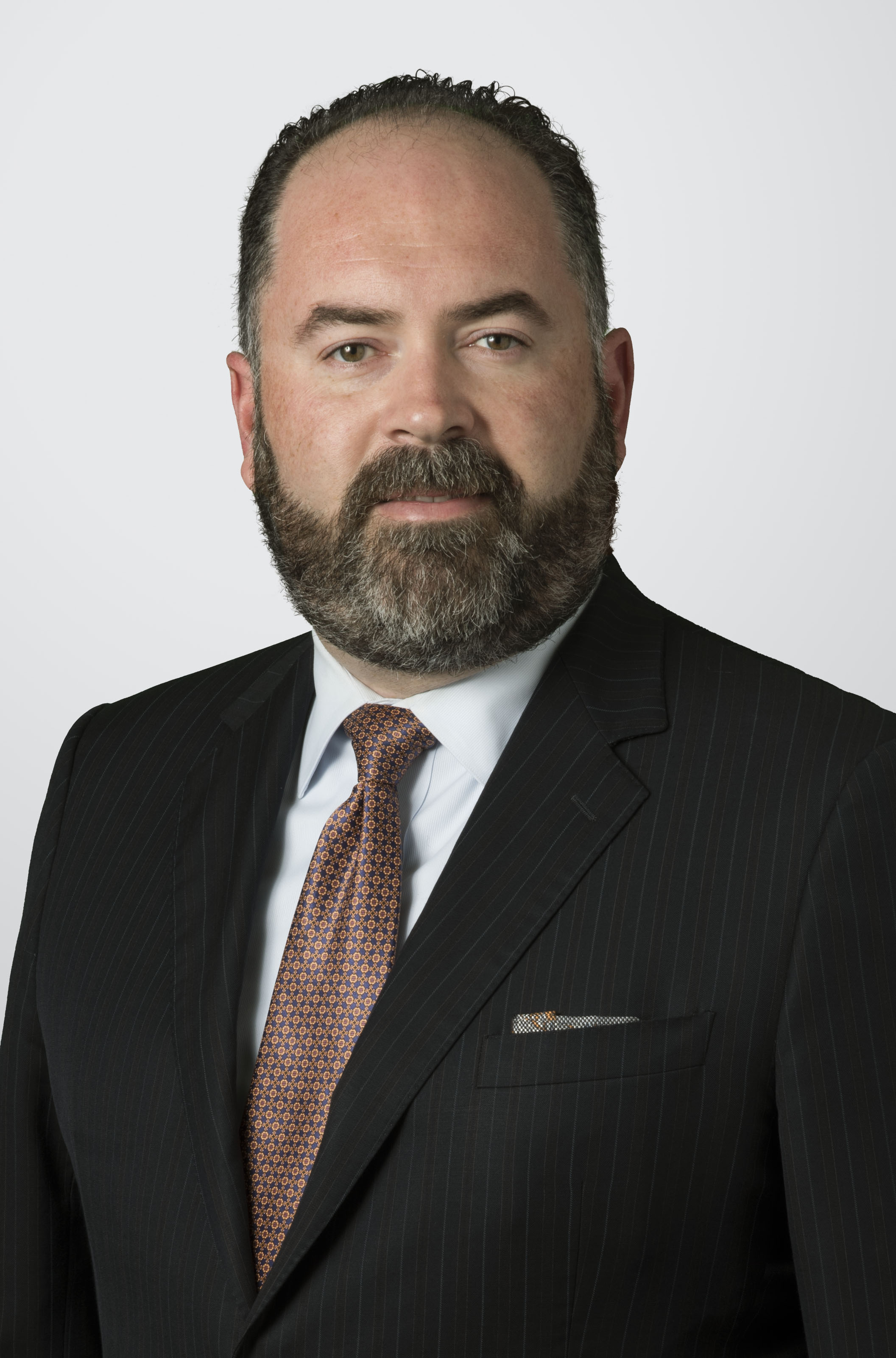
- Born: Tulsa, Oklahoma, U.S.
- Education: University of Texas at Arlington (BBA); University of Texas at Arlington (MS); SMU (JD)
- Occupation: Lawyer
- Employer: Holland & Knight
- Spouse: Lauren Melton

Mark Aaron Melton (born March 20, 1978) is an American attorney and housing advocate based in Dallas, Texas. His housing advocacy work has focused primarily on renters' rights and on eviction prevention. He co-founded and heads the Dallas Eviction Advocacy Center, an organization of volunteer attorneys that helps renters avoid eviction and housing insecurity. He is a partner at Holland & Knight.

== Early life and education ==
Melton grew up in Tulsa, Oklahoma. He was raised in a politically conservative household and attended a small, private high school run by Victory Christian Church. Melton graduated from high school a semester early and chose to enter the workforce, finding employment with a debt collection company rather than attending college. When the company, Commercial Financial Services, went bankrupt in 1999, Melton lost his income and was subsequently evicted from home with his wife and two young children. Following his eviction in Tulsa, Melton relocated to Dallas, Texas to find work. He enrolled in junior college at Tarrant County College. In 2003, Melton graduated from the University of Texas at Arlington (UTA) with a Bachelors of Business Administration and a Masters of Science in Taxation. On January 31, 2004, he and a UTA teammate won the National Moot Court Competition. Melton applied to thirteen law schools and was accepted only into Southern Methodist University, where he took night classes while working at a tax firm during the day; he graduated in 2008.

== Career ==
After graduating from law school, Melton went to work for the law firm of Hunton & Williams. In 2018, he moved to Holland & Knight as a tax attorney and partner.

== Pro bono and community work ==
During the first weeks of the COVID-19 pandemic, when layoffs were increasingly widespread, Melton started using Facebook to answer questions about evictions. In 2020, Melton started Dallas Evictions 2020, an organization with close to 200 attorneys, as of May 2021, that provided pro bono eviction assistance during the COVID-19 pandemic. Melton and the group also secured donations to help families pay back rent and hire legal representation.

In January 2021, Melton and his wife, Lauren, co-founded the Dallas Eviction Advocacy Center (DEAC) to provide pro bono services to tenants facing eviction, including advising renters on protections, representing them in court, and helping them access government aid for rent payments. As of February 2022, Melton and his team's success rate at keeping clients from eviction was about 96% and had helped about 10,000 people. Much of the DEAC's private funding came from the Meltons. When Melton relied on outside sources, he used private grants rather than government funds, which he believed would have slowed their work down. Melton also collaborated with nonprofits such as the United Way and City Square to provide other services for struggling renters. In addition to legal services, Melton and his wife recruited volunteers to help renters move, collect furnishings for new apartments and enroll their children in area schools or daycare. In September 2021, Melton drafted an ordinance, adopted by the city of Dallas, giving tenants 60 days to prove they had undergone financial hardship due to COVID-19 pandemic, while allowing them time to come up with money to pay back rent.

== Personal life ==
Melton and Lauren Melton married in 2017. He has four children.
