= Stephen Schulhofer =

American legal academic

- Born: Stephen Joseph Schulhofer; August 20, 1942 (age 84)
- Title: Robert B. McKay Professor of Law
- Spouse: Laurie Wohl
- Children: 2

Academic background
- Education: Princeton University (B.A. 1964); Harvard Law School (J.D. 1967)

Academic work
- Discipline: Criminal justice
- Institutions: New York University School of Law; University of Pennsylvania Law School; University of Chicago Law School
- Notable works: More essential than ever: the Fourth Amendment in the twenty-first century (2012)

Stephen Joseph Schulhofer (born August 20, 1942) is the Robert B. McKay Professor of Law at New York University School of Law. His academic focus is criminal justice.

== Background ==
Schulhofer completed his B.A. summa cum laude in 1964 at Princeton University, and his J.D. summa cum laude in 1967 at Harvard Law School, where he was an editor of the Harvard Law Review. He then clerked for U.S. Supreme Court Justice Hugo Black for two years. He practiced for three years with the law firm Coudert Frères in Paris, from 1969 to 1972.

Schulhofer was then the Ferdinand Wakefield Hubbell Professor of Law at the University of Pennsylvania Law School where he taught from 1972 to 1986, and the Julius Kreeger Professor of Law and Director for Studies in Criminal Justice at the University of Chicago Law School where he taught from 1986 to 2001.

Schulhofer is now the Robert B. McKay Professor of Law at NYU Law School. He has written over 50 articles and seven books, including More Essential than Ever: the Fourth Amendment in the Twenty-First Century (2012), The Enemy Within: Intelligence Gathering, Law Enforcement, and Civil Liberties in the Wake of September 11 (2002), and Unwanted Sex: The Culture of Intimidation and the Failure of Law (2000).

He is a Reporter for "Model Penal Code: Sexual Assault and Related Offenses". At the 2016 annual meeting of the American Law Institute its members overwhelmingly rejected a proposal by Schulhofer and fellow reporter Erin Murphy to impose an affirmative consent requirement (to the effect that if the non-initiating sex partner did not actually say yes, then the initiator could be charged with assault) to prove consent was given at each stage of a sexual encounter, in defining sexual assault.

== Personal life ==
Schulhofer is married to Laurie Wohl, an artist who trained as a lawyer. They have two children, Samuel and Jonah.

== See also ==
- List of law clerks for the first seat of the Supreme Court of the United States
