= National Moot Court Competition =

The National Moot Court Competition is one of the oldest and most prestigious moot court competitions in the United States. Co-sponsored by the New York City Bar Association and the American College of Trial Lawyers, the competition includes up to 191 teams from 124 law schools, who compete in regional competitions in November with the top two in each region advancing to the national competition held in the landmark House of the New York City Bar Association in February.

== History ==
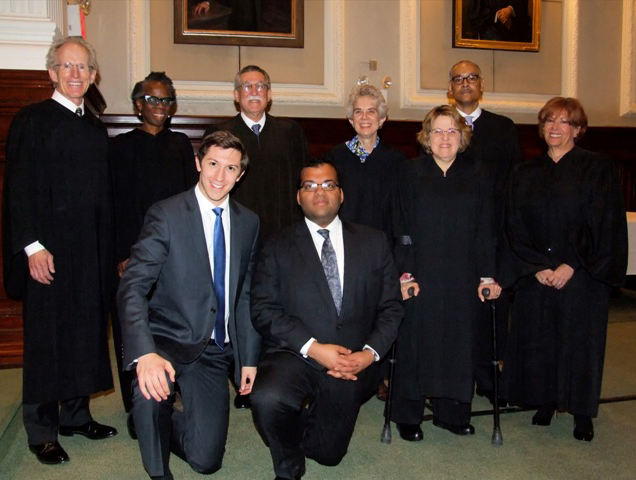
Dane Shikman and Kyle Singhal (center) of the George Washington University Law School won the 2015 National Moot Court Competition, defeating Georgetown University before a seven-justice bench.

The National Moot Court Competition was created in 1947 by Harrison Tweed, then president of the New York City Bar Association, as part of a campaign to recruit younger members to the City Bar in the years following World War II.

The first competition was held at the City Bar's building in January 1950. Twelve law school teams debated the legality of "rainmaking," or the use by farmers of rainmaking devices to divert water from adjacent land. The program was formatted as a mock appeal, in order to develop the skills of appellate advocacy among law students.

In the years since, the moot court competition has expanded to include competitions in 15 regions throughout the continental United States. The cases argued traditionally focus on a timely issue arising under the United States Constitution, in keeping with the competition's original theme of appellate advocacy. The final national competition continues to be held in New York, and the final argument between the top two teams is judged by a seven-person mock court, including prominent jurists, the president of the New York City Bar Association and the president of the American College of Trial Lawyers.

== Organization ==
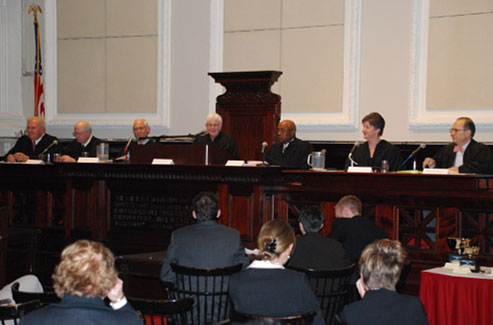
Judges of the 2008 competition during final arguments, from left to right: Mikel L. Stout; The Honorable Richard Andrias; The Honorable Julio M. Fuentes; Honorable Deanell Reece Tacha; The Honorable Theodore T. Jones, Jr.; The Honorable Roslynn Mauskopf; Barry M. Kamins

In both the regional and national competitions, all teams are required to argue the same single case on appeal. The case consists of two issues drawn from current legal issues that are likely to be considered by the Supreme Court in the near future. The cases are devised and prepared each year by the Young Lawyers Committee of the New York City Bar Association.

The National Moot Court Competition begins on the regional level. The United States is divided into fifteen regions, each of which hosts its own regional competition for teams whose law schools fall within their jurisdiction. Each fall, the New York City Bar Association invites all ABA-accredited law schools to field moot court teams of two to three students to participate in regional competitions. The regional winners and runners-up compete in a four-day national competition, as the 30-team field narrows to sixteen, eight, four, two, and ultimately one champion over the course of the competition.

The best overall team is presented with the Fulton Haight Award, which includes a trophy and a cash reward. The team presenting the best oral arguments is awarded the John W. Davis award, which includes an engraved silver cup. Best individual speaker and runner-up for best individual speaker are both awarded crystal obelisks by the American College of Trial Lawyers.

== Rules ==
Every participating team is required to submit a brief in advance of the regional and (if they qualify to attend) national competitions. At each competition, teams are required to argue both sides of their appeal. Competitors are judged 40% on written briefs, and 60% on oral presentation. The Competition is administered by, and governed by Rules drafted by, the New York City Bar's Young Lawyers Committee.

== Notable Past Participants ==
The National Moot Court Competition has attracted a prestigious roster of past judges and competitors. United States Supreme Court Justices Thurgood Marshall, Potter Stewart, Byron White, William Rehnquist, Ruth Bader Ginsburg, Sandra Day O'Connor, and Anthony Kennedy have all judged past final rounds. Other notable judges have included Hon. Barrington D. Parker, Hon. Judith S. Kaye, and Hon. Amalya Kearse.

== Past Champions ==
2025: Boston University School of Law - Henry Drembus, Preetham Chippada and Michael Gorman
2024: Fordham University School of Law - Joseph Orlando, Blake Elwood
2023: Mercer University School of Law - John Flowers, Zachary Mullinax
2022: Texas Tech University School of Law
2021: LMU Loyola Law School, Los Angeles - Alexandro Garza, Jillian LeMaster-Dwyer, Sierra TeNyenhuis
2020: University of Georgia School of Law - Jonathan Kaufman, John Lex Kenerly IV, Joseph H. "Joe" Stuhrenberg
2019: University of Alabama School of Law - Lindsey Barber, Cory Church, Anne Miles Golson
2018: Northwestern Pritzker School of Law - Taylor Mullaney, LJ Pavletic, Brendan Gerdes
2017: Wake Forest University School of Law - Matt Cloutier, Mia Falzarano, Blake Stafford
2016: Texas Tech University School of Law - Kristen Vanderplas, C.J. Baker, Shelby Hall
2015: George Washington University Law School - Kyle Singhal and Dane Shikman
2014: University of Georgia School of Law - Steven Strasberg, Ben Thorpe, Emily Westberry
2013: Stetson University College of Law- Julia McGrath, Victoria San Pedro, Andrew Harris
2012: Texas Tech University School of Law - Brandon Beck, Allie Hallmark, and Elizabeth Hill
2011: Texas Tech University School of Law - Alexis Butler, Daniel Durell, and Jason Jordan
2010: University of Arkansas School of Law - Ashley Driver, Taylor Mattson, Allison Waldrip
2009: Chicago-Kent College of Law - Andrew Booth, Brody Dawson, Betsy Gates
2008: Chicago-Kent College of Law - Joanna Brinkman, Lalania Gilkey-Johnson, Rachel Moran
2007: University of Washington School of Law - Dustin Buehler, Candice Tewell, Aaron Thomson
2006: Duke University School of Law - April Nelson, Sara Wickware, Audry Casusol
2005: South Texas College of Law-Angela Hamilton, Hillary Greene, Charles Soechting
2004: South Texas College of Law - Marit M. Babin, Kenneth O. Corley, J. Daniel Johnson
2003: Wayne State University Law School - Dana Bennett, Jennifer Savage, Caroline Whittemore
2002: University of California Hastings College of Law - Robert Hodil, Mohammad Keshavarzi, Joel Muchmore
2001: Drake University Law School - Theodore Sims II, William "Bull" Schultz, Jeffrey Link, Jacque "You See" Swuitez
2000: University of Montana School of Law - Bobbi Frazer, John Mudd, Taryn Stampfl

== Past Best Advocates ==
2024: University of Memphis School of Law (best brief)
2021: Jillian LeMaster-Dwyer, LMU Loyola Law School, Los Angeles
2020: Joseph H. "Joe" Stuhrenberg, University of Georgia School of Law
2019: Anne Miles Golson, Hugh F. Culverhouse Jr. School of Law at The University of Alabama
2018: Taylor Mullaney, Northwestern Pritzker School of Law
2017: Mia Falzarano, Wake Forest University School of Law
2016: Kyle Crawford, Georgetown University Law Center
2015: Stephen Petkis, Georgetown University Law Center
2014: Ben Thorpe, University of Georgia School of Law
2013: Michael Coleman Gretchen, University of Georgia School of Law
2012: Grace Yang, University of California Berkeley Law
2011: Alexis Butler, Texas Tech University
2010: Allison Waldrip, University of Arkansas School of Law
2009: Daniel Schwei, University of Pennsylvania
2008: Rachel Moran, Chicago-Kent College of Law

== Sources and External Resources ==
- "Fifty Years of Moot Court." 44th Street Notes. February, 2001. Published by the New York City Bar Association.
- National Moot Court Competition, New York City Bar Association.
- American College of Trial Lawyers.
