= Robert M. Kaufman =

American lawyer

Robert Kaufman (1929 - April 8, 2024) was a New York City attorney, a partner with the law firm Proskauer Rose, and a former president of the New York City Bar Association.

== Education ==
Kaufman received his Bachelor’s Degree from Brooklyn College in 1951, his Master’s Degree from New York University in 1954; and his Juris Doctor from Brooklyn Law School in 1957, where he was Decisions editor of the Brooklyn Law Review. While attending law school, he was a Senior Economist for the New York State Division of Housing.

== Career ==
After graduating from Brooklyn Law School, Kaufman worked for the Antitrust Division of the United States Department of Justice. He then served as a legislative assistant to New York Senator Jacob K. Javits, before joining Proskauer Rose.

At Proskauer, Kaufman’s practice has focused on health and hospital law, the law of not-for-profit corporations, multinational corporate law and personal representation. He has also been a strategist in major corporate acquisitions in the United States and Canada by the Pirelli Group and was Chairman of the Board of the Pirelli Group’s United States companies in the cable and tire industries. He also was Chairman of the Board of Old Westbury Funds, Inc., a mutual fund group advised by Bessemer Trust Company.

== Civic involvement ==
Among his many civic posts, Robert Kaufman had served as chairman of the Times Square Business Improvement District, and the Fund for Modern Courts, as president of the American Judicature Society, and had served on the board of The New York Community Trust as vice chairman, and was a consulting member. He had served on the executive committees of the Legal Aid Society, New York Lawyers for the Public Interest, and Volunteers of Legal Service and was on the resource board of the National Association of Women Judges.

He was also on the board of directors of Legal Momentum (formerly the NOW Legal Defense and Education Fund), Citizens Union of the City of New York, Women's Research and Education Institute, VNS Health, VNS Health Hospice Care and Public Health Solutions and was a trustee of Brooklyn Law School and on the advisory board of the Alliance for National Defense. From 1986 to 1988, Kaufman also served as president of the New York City Bar Association. He had previously served as chairman of the association’s executive committee.

He was also a former member of the board of visitors of the U.S. Military Academy (West Point), the Defense Advisory Committee on Women in the Services, the judicial advisory committees to Senators Javits and Moynihan, the Administrative Conference of the United States, and the U. S. Delegation to the International Conference of Courts of Military Appeals. He was also a member of the New York City Quadrennial Commission on Compensation of Elected Officials and chaired the New York State Board of Public Disclosure and the advisory committee to the New York State Board of Elections.

He also served as a special master of the Appellate Division of New York State Supreme Court and as a member of the New York City Age Friendly Commission and of the Mayor's Midtown Citizens Committee.

== Personal life ==
Kaufman was born in Vienna, Austria, and came to England in 1938 on the Kindertransport and to the United States in 1939, as a Holocaust survivor. Kaufman was married to Sheila Kelley Kaufman (1928–2009), a native of Bronxville, New York, and daughter of William J. and Jane Seymour Kelley.

== Sources ==
- Robert Kaufman Biography at Proskauer
- Robert Kaufman Biography at American Judicature Society
