= Zelia Peet Ruebhausen =

American civic leader and policy advisor

Zelia Peet Ruebhausen (1914 – January 24, 1990) was an American civic leader and policy advisor.

== Early life ==
Zelia Krumbhaar Peet was born in Rye, New York, the daughter of William Creighton Peet and Meta Brevoort Potts Peet. She was named for her paternal grandmother, Emma Zelia Krumbhaar Peet. She attended Miss Hall's School in Pittsfield, Massachusetts before attending Vassar College, where she graduated in the class of 1937.

== Career ==
Ruebhausen held a wide array of volunteer positions on advisory committees and councils and executive boards. When asked why she did not seek paid employment instead, she explained, "Because as a volunteer there's no limit to what I can do." During World War II she was the private secretary to an Assistant Secretary of the Navy. She did research for the Spelman Fund, and for the National Association of Manufacturers.

She was the only woman member of the World Trade Advisory Committee of the United States Department of Commerce in 1957. She also served on the Advisory Committee on Africa of the United States Department of State. She was a consultant to the Council on Foreign Relations from 1967 to 1970. She served on the New York City Charter Revision Commission (1972-1977). She led the Women's Africa Committee and served on the board of trustees of the African-American Institute. She was also active with the International House of New York. At the New School for Social Research she served on the Board of Overseers in the Center for New York City Affairs.

Ruebhausen was an official observer at the United Nations, appointed in 1946 by the League of Women Voters. "If the United States is to exert leadership, it cannot do it by dollars alone," she wrote in a report for the League. "We must also live up to our beliefs in the dignity of man and the rights of all citizens to equal opportunities." She represented the League at least four times to testify before Congress. She was an officer of the Foundation for Citizens Education, and of Women United for the United Nations.

== Personal life ==
In 1942, Zelia K. Peet married lawyer Oscar M. Ruebhausen, who was president of the New York City Bar Association and longtime advisor to Nelson Rockefeller. She died in 1990, aged 75 years, in Rancho Santa Fe, California, from ovarian cancer. There is a Zelia P. Ruebhausen Student Fund at Yale University, named in her memory.
