= Samuel W. Seymour =

American lawyer

- Born: New Hampshire, United States
- Occupation: Lawyer
- Employer: Sullivan & Cromwell

Samuel W. Seymour, a lawyer, is of counsel at the firm of Sullivan & Cromwell LLP and former president of the New York City Bar Association.

== Education ==
Seymour received his bachelor's degree from Dartmouth College in 1979, and his law degree from Columbia Law School in 1982.

== Legal career ==
As a lawyer in Sullivan & Cromwell's Criminal Defense and Investigations Group, Seymour concentrates on white-collar criminal defense, regulatory enforcement matters, and internal investigations. He has represented clients in investigations involving allegations of accounting fraud, securities fraud, foreign bribery, price fixing, economic sanctions violations, money laundering and obstruction of justice. He also handles derivative cases, shareholder actions and complex contract disputes.

== Selected cases ==
Seymour has handled the resolution of government investigations for clients including: The Bank of New York, Spiegel, Inc., UBS, Bankers Trust Company, Statoil ASA, Moody's Investors Service, Assicurazioni Generali S.p.A., Banco Popular de Puerto Rico, Morgan Crucible plc, ABN AMRO Bank, and Wachovia. He served as lead trial counsel in 15 criminal jury trials in federal courts and argued several appeals in the Second Circuit.

== New York City Bar Association ==
Seymour began his two-year term as president of the New York City Bar Association in April 2010. He had previously served as both a member and chair of the executive committee, vice president of the association, and chair of the board of the City Bar Justice Center.

== See also ==
- Sullivan & Cromwell
- New York City Bar Association
- City Bar Justice Center
