= Stephen P. Nash =

American lawyer

Stephen Payne Nash
- Born: August 26, 1821; Albany, New York, US
- Died: June 4, 1898 (aged 76); Bernardsville, New Jersey, US
- Title: President of the New York City Bar Association
- Term: 1880–1881

Stephen Payne Nash (August 26, 1821 – June 4, 1898) was a lawyer in New York City and an expert in church law.

He was born in Albany, New York on August 26, 1821 to David Nash and Hannah Payn. He was a descendant of Thomas Nash, one of the original settlers of New Haven, Connecticut. He attended school at The Albany Academy and the French College in Chambly, Quebec.

Upon graduating, Nash worked for Esek Cowen in Saratoga Springs and later Augustus Bockes, both justices of the New York Supreme Court. He moved to New York City in 1845, where specialized in equity law, and from 1880 to 1881 served as president of the New York City Bar Association, of which he was a founding member. He worked with several partners, ultimately joining his son to form the firm of S.P. & J. McLean Nash.

Nash became a vestryman in the Episcopal Church in 1868, and was a Senior Warden at the time of his death. He became an expert in laws concerning religious corporations, and represented the New York diocese of the Episcopal Church in many legal matters from 1880 onward. He became a trustee of the New York diocese and traveled to England to serve as an expert witness before the Committee of Privileges of the House of Lords on behalf of the Anglican Church in 1885.

He died of heart failure in Bernardsville, New Jersey on June 4, 1898. His funeral was held at Trinity Church in Manhattan.
