= Louis A. Craco =

American lawyer (1933–2020)

Louis Aloysius Craco Jr. (CRAY-koh; October 18, 1933 – February 15, 2020) was an American lawyer. At the time of his death, he was the youngest president of the New York City Bar Association and a life member of the American Law Institute. He was a partner with the law firm Willkie, Farr & Gallagher and, later, Craco & Ellsworth. He was a co-founder of the Volunteers of Legal Service (VOLS) of New York City - organization providing pro bono legal services to low income New Yorkers. In 2004 he was awarded a Gold medal from the New York State Bar Association for his numerous contributions to development of the profession.

Craco died of a stroke on February 15, 2020, in Manhasset, NY.

== Early life and education ==
Louis Aloysius Craco Jr. was born on October 18, 1933, in the Bronx in New York City. His father, Louis Craco Sr., was an auctioneer of fine art and antique furniture, while his mother, Catherine (Giblin) Craco, was a schoolteacher. He attended Iona Preparatory School in New Rochelle, New York. He then graduated from the College of the Holy Cross in Worcester, Massachusetts, with a Bachelor of Arts, magna cum laude, in political science in 1954. As an undergraduate at Holy Cross, he was an editor of The Tomahawk, the college's yearbook. He then earned his Bachelor of Laws (LL.B.), cum laude, from the New York University School of Law, where he was a Root-Tilden Scholar.

== Career ==
Craco was a partner at the law firm Willkie, Farr and Gallagher from 1964 until 2003, and also served as senior partner in the Litigation Department. His experience included general business litigation, domestic and transnational disputes relating to commercial transactions; contests over control or dissolution of corporations, partnerships and joint ventures; antitrust and trade regulation; intellectual property and unfair competition; financial and accounting issues; environmental matters; transportation equipment and marine financing; banking; insurance; professional liability; securities; bankruptcy and reorganizations.

From 1982 to 1984, he served as president of the New York City Bar Association. In 1984 he co-founded the Volunteers of Legal Service (VOLS) of New York City, in which attorneys provided free services to New Yorkers in need. In 1999 Craco was appointed the Chair of the New York State Judicial Institute on Professionalism in the Law. He also served in the New York State Court of Appeals Committee on the Profession in the Courts.

He was also a fellow of the American College of Trial Lawyers and the American Bar Association. In 2004 he was awarded a Gold medal from the New York State Bar Association - to recognize his high professionalism and numerous contributions to civic and community matters.

Craco was a life member of the American Law Institute.
