= Barry Kamins =

American judge

Barry Kamins is a retired New York City Criminal Court Judge as well as an adjunct professor at the Fordham University School of Law and Brooklyn Law School.

== Education ==
Kamins received his bachelor's degree from Columbia College in 1965 and his Juris Doctor degree in 1968 from Rutgers School of Law—Newark. He is a graduate of Brooklyn Technical High School.

== Legal career ==
Kamins served as an Assistant District Attorney in Kings County from 1969 to 1973 where he rose to the rank of Deputy Chief of the Criminal Court Bureau. Following his time at the District Attorney's Office, Kamins left to become a criminal defense lawyer in Brooklyn at the law firm of Flamhaft, Levy, Kamins, Hirsch & Rendeiro LLP. During his time in private practice, Kamins represented numerous lawyers and judges probed by the Appellate Division's disciplinary committee.

In 2006, Kamins was elected president of the New York City Bar Association for a two-year term. Kamins became the first president of the City Bar with a law practice based outside of Manhattan in the association's 136-year history.

Kamin taught courses on New York Criminal Procedure at Fordham University School of Law and Brooklyn Law School. Kamins authored numerous articles and publications, including New York Search & Seizure (1991).

== Judicial service ==
Kaims is a retired judge, originally appointed in 2008 to the New York City Criminal Court by Mayor Michael Bloomberg. In 2009, Kamins was transferred from Manhattan to the Kings County Criminal Term after Chief Administrative Judge Ann Pfau appointed Kamins the Administrative Judge for Criminal Matters.

== 2014 Department of Investigation Report ==
In a June 2014 report, the New York City Department of Investigation accused Kamins of violating the Code of Judicial Conduct by giving ex-Brooklyn District Attorney Charles Hynes political and legal advice and by discussing cases being prosecuted by the District Attorney's office. Kamins was relieved of all administrative duties pending resolution of the investigation. In the 27-page report, the DOI said Kamins shed his mandated neutrality when he “engaged in political activity by a sitting judge.”

Kamins was temporarily returned to duty as a Supreme Court Justice in Queens County in July 2014.

Kamins agreed to retire, effective December 1, 2014, under a stipulation with the state Commission on Judicial Conduct, ending both his judicial career and the commission's investigation.

== Law Practice ==
In 2021, Kamins was retained by former mayor Rudy Giuliani as one of the lawyers in connection to the federal investigation against possible lobbying violations. He also represented Giuliani when the former mayor's law license was suspended on June 24, 2021, by the NY Appellate Court for Giuliani's misleading statements about election fraud in the 2020 presidential election, some of which are alleged to have led to the insurrection at the U.S. Capitol on Jan. 6, 2021.
