= Russell D. Niles =

American lawyer

Russell D. Niles (June 7, 1902 – September 16, 1992) was a lawyer and expert in Trust Law, president of the New York City Bar Association, and a dean of New York University School of Law.

== Early life and education ==
Russell Niles was born in Twin Valley, Minnesota in 1902. He earned his Bachelor of Arts and Juris Doctor from the University of Montana in 1924 and 1925, respectively.

Following his graduation, from 1925 to 1929 Niles served as a debate coach and English professor at the University of Colorado.

In 1929, he enrolled at Yale Law School, and earned his Master of Laws degree in 1931.

== Legal career ==
Upon receiving his L.L.M., Niles joined the faculty of New York University School of Law, where he became a full professor in 1944. From 1942 to 1944, Niles was also a Trusts and Estates lawyer at the New York firm Putnam & Roberts. At NYU, he specialized in trust law, and in 1948 he became dean of the Law School, a post which he held until 1963. He continued to teach law as the Charles Denison professor of law from 1963 to 1966, when he retired to San Francisco. After retiring, Niles taught as an emeritus professor at University of California, Hastings College of the Law.

Aside from his teaching career, Niles also held a number of public posts. He chaired the American Bar Association's Section on Real Property Probate and Trust Law; served as director of the Institute of Judicial Administration; and from 1966 to 1967 served as president of the New York City Bar Association.

== Death ==
Russell Niles died at his home in San Francisco on September 16, 1992 at the age of 90.

== Sources ==
- “Russell Niles, 90, Ex-Chancellor of N.Y.U. and Law School Dean.” The New York Times. Obituaries. September 17, 1992.
- “Law Dean Urges a Fresh Outlook; Niles of N.Y.U. Asks Equal Opportunity in Schooling.” The New York Times. October 29, 1961.
