= Francis T. P. Plimpton =

American lawyer

Francis Taylor Pearsons Plimpton (December 7, 1900 – July 30, 1983) was an American diplomat, New York City lawyer, partner at the law firm Debevoise & Plimpton and a president of the New York City Bar Association.

== Early life ==
Plimpton was born on East 33rd Street in New York City on December 7, 1900, the son of George Arthur Plimpton, of Walpole, Massachusetts, and his first wife, Frances Taylor (Pearsons). He was descended from a prominent Boston family. His ancestor John Plympton arrived in Roxbury, Massachusetts, in 1630.

Plimpton was educated at Phillips Exeter Academy, Amherst College, and Harvard Law School, where he was a roommate of Adlai Stevenson. On a recommendation from Felix Frankfurter, Plimpton began writing editorials on legal issues for the New York World for Walter Lippmann while still at Harvard.

== Early career ==
After graduating from Harvard, Plimpton was hired by Elihu Root's law firm, Root, Clark, Buckner, Howland & Ballantine, and from 1929 to 1931 he took charge of the firm's Paris office. In 1926, he married Pauline, the daughter of the botanist Oakes Ames; they had four children, one of whom was George Plimpton, a writer and founder of the Paris Review.

From 1931 to 1933, Plimpton worked for the Reconstruction Finance Corporation. In 1933, he joined the firm Debevoise & Stevenson, which became Debevoise, Stevenson & Plimpton and later Debevoise & Plimpton. Plimpton became an expert in the legal problems of railroads and the reorganization of public utilities. Plimpton also became an expert on the legal requirements of the Securities Act of 1933 and built a large clientele, especially in the insurance industry, as a result of the new law.

== Later career ==
In 1961, Plimpton was appointed by President John F. Kennedy to the United States delegation to the United Nations at the behest of Ambassador Adlai Stevenson. While at the U.N., Plimpton was assigned to the Special Political Committee and was also involved with the Budgetary and Legal Committee. He served as Adlai Stevenson's second-in-command until Stevenson's death in 1966.

From 1968 to 1970, Plimpton also served as president of the New York City Bar Association, where he became involved in the political debates of the late 1960s, particularly over the Vietnam War. In May 1970, he controversially led a group of young lawyers from New York to Washington, D.C., to lobby against the war on Capitol Hill. As Sheldon Oliensis, another president of the Bar, later recalled, Plimpton believed that there was "no issue on which the Bar could not be heard."

== New York society ==
In addition to his career as an attorney and diplomat, Plimpton was also active in New York society. He was a member of the board of the New York Philharmonic, the Foreign Policy Association, the American-Italy Society, Roosevelt Hospital and the Metropolitan Museum of Art, where he was instrumental in securing the acquisition of the Temple of Dendur.

Plimpton's son, George Plimpton, was a writer and a founder of The Paris Review.

== Death ==
Plimpton died of complications resulting from pneumonia, at Huntington Hospital on Long Island, on July 30, 1983. He was 82 years old.

== Sources ==
- Goodale, James C. "Francis T.P. Plimpton: A Colleague’s Reflection." The New York Law Journal August 4, 1983.
- "Francis T.P. Plimpton, 82, Dies." The New York Times. July 31, 1983.
- Morris, Jeffrey B. (1997). "Making Sure We are True to Our Founders": The Association of the Bar of the City of New York, 1980–1995. New York: Fordham University Press. ISBN 0-8232-1738-8.
