= City Bar Justice Center =

Non-profit organization in New York City, U.S.

The City Bar Justice Center (Justice Center) provides pro bono legal services to low-income clients throughout New York City. It is part of the Association of the Bar of the City of New York Fund, Inc., a 501(c)(3) corporation.

== History ==
The City Bar Justice Center grew out of ad hoc efforts at the New York City Bar Association during the 1970s and 1980s to provide pro bono legal services to the poor. These efforts in 1978, included a committee of senior volunteer lawyers that was formed to assist senior citizens and prisoners. In the early 1980s, the Committee on Immigration and Nationality Law trained volunteer lawyers to help Haitians with asylum claims, and following passage of the 1986 Immigration Law that provided a one-year amnesty for illegal immigrants, the Committee organized legal clinics at churches and neighborhood associations as well. Around the same time, the City Bar's Committee on Legal Assistance sponsored a pro bono project in Housing Court.

In 1987, the City Bar created the Community Outreach Law Program (COLP) to provide legal information, referral services, and direct representation to the city's homeless. Through the early 1990s, COLP expanded to include Monday Night Law, a free weekly clinic at the City Bar; AIDS Counseling; Hostos Center for Women's and Immigrants’ Rights; as well as bankruptcy, homeless, cancer and elder law projects. By 1993, more than 100 summer associates volunteered in COLP programs. In 1997, the Self-Help Information, Education and Legal Defense (SHIELD) Hotline was launched as a low-income parallel to the City Bar's Legal Referral Service. In 1989, the Hostos Center for Women's and Immigrants’ Rights received the State Bar Association's Award of Merit. In 1983, the Immigrants Legal Rights Project received the American Bar Association’s Public Service Award.

In response to the events of 9/11, the City Bar, through its COLP and SHIELD projects, trained approximately 3,000 attorneys and served over 4,000 New Yorkers affected by 9/11 with pro bono representation.

In 2005, the City Bar Fund changed its name to the City Bar Justice Center.

== Mission ==
According to its 2008-2009 Annual Report, “The City Bar Justice Center’s mission is to increase access to justice by leveraging the resources of the New York City legal community. Drawing upon our relationship with the New York City Bar, the Justice Center provides legal assistance to those in need; mobilizes lawyers, law firms, corporate legal departments, and other legal institutions to provide pro bono legal services; educates the public on legal issues; fosters strategic relationships; and impacts public policy.”

== Initiatives ==
The NYC Know Your Rights Project is a collaboration with The Legal Aid Society and the New York Chapter of the American Immigration Lawyers Association. The Project recruits and trains pro bono attorneys to interview and advise detained immigrants at a weekly legal clinic held at the Varick Federal Detention Facility in downtown Manhattan.

The Immigrant Women and Children Project assists survivors of violence, abuse and human trafficking in legalizing their immigration status. Project staff train law enforcement, community-based organizations and NGOs on the legal remedies available to these crime victims.

The Refugee Assistance Project represents individuals who have suffered torture and other forms of persecution in their home countries and who are seeking asylum in the U.S. The Project also assists with filing relative petitions and obtaining asylum-related benefits such as employment authorization, refugee travel documents and green cards.

The Legal Clinic for the Homeless provides advice, advocacy and representation to families who are residents of homeless shelters on a variety of matters related to public benefits. The Project sponsors legal clinics at homeless shelters, with services provided by a partnering law firm or corporate legal department.

The Consumer Bankruptcy Project provides legal assistance to low-income consumers with outstanding debts, assisting with the filing of pro se bankruptcy petitions, and providing pro bono representation to debtors in contested matters.

The Foreclosure Project recruits, trains and mentors pro bono attorneys to assist distressed homeowners in an effort to preserve homes and minimize damage to creditworthiness. It includes the Lawyers Foreclosure Intervention Network, co-sponsored by the Federal Reserve Bank of New York, and additional efforts supported by the New York State Banking Department and New York State Housing Trust Fund Corporation.

The Veterans Assistance Project recruits, trains and mentors volunteer attorneys to provide pro bono assistance to veterans in connections with the filing of disability benefits claims before the New York City Regional Office of the Department of Veterans Affairs.

The Neighborhood Entrepreneur Law Project provides legal assistance to low-income micro-entrepreneurs in the initial stages of structuring a company or strengthening an existing business.

The Elderlaw Project trains pro bono attorneys to counsel and represent seniors in a variety of legal areas.

The Cancer Advocacy Project provides cancer patients, survivors and their families with legal information and pro bono legal assistance on issues relating to discrimination in the workplace, health law, insurance issues, access to public benefits, advance directives and wills.

The City Bar Public Service Network serves as a clearinghouse for pro bono opportunities throughout New York City and develops innovative legal and non-legal volunteer placements for attorneys.

The Legal Hotline assists over 1,000 telephone callers a month on a range of civil issues.

== Leadership and Governance ==
The Justice Center is part of the Association of the Bar of the City of New York Fund, a 501(c)3 corporation. Kurt M. Denk is the Justice Center's executive director.

== See also ==
- New York City Bar Association
