= Conrad K. Harper =

American lawyer

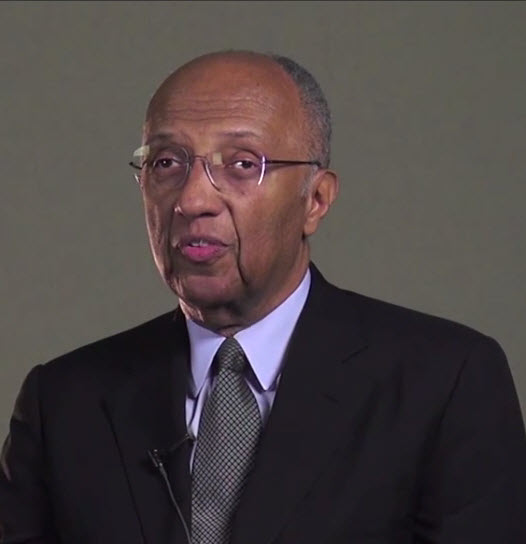

18th Legal Adviser of the Department of State
- In office May 24, 1993 – June 30, 1996
- Preceded by: Edwin D. Williamson
- Succeeded by: David Andrews

Personal details
- Born: December 2, 1940 (age 84) Detroit, Michigan, U.S.
- Education: Howard University (BA); Harvard University (LLB)
- Occupation: Attorney; academic
- Awards: Henry J. Friendly Medal (2017)

Conrad K. Harper (born December 2, 1940) is an American lawyer. He is a retired partner at Simpson Thacher & Bartlett LLP, a former president of the New York City Bar Association, and an emeritus member of the Council of the American Law Institute.

== Early life and education ==
Harper was born in Detroit, Michigan, on December 2, 1940. His father was an attorney and his mother was an English teacher.

Harper received a Bachelor of Arts degree cum laude from Howard University, where he was elected to Phi Beta Kappa. He received his law degree from Harvard Law School.

He was awarded an honorary Doctor of Laws degree by Harvard University in 2007.

== Career ==
Harper began his career in 1965 as an attorney with the NAACP Legal Defense Fund. There he worked on a number of civil rights cases, including Keyes v. School District No. 1, Denver, the first case in which the United States Supreme Court ruled on de facto school segregation that had not been ordered by law.

In 1971, he joined the firm Simpson Thacher & Bartlett. When he became a partner in 1974, he was one of only two African-American partners at a major law firm in New York City. At Simpson Thacher, Harper concentrated on product liability, securities, environmental law, and civil rights.

== Other public service ==
Harper was also active in a number of bar associations. Sponsored for membership in the New York City Bar Association by Francis E. Rivers, the Association's first African-American member, Harper served on a number of the organization's committees, including those on Federal Legislation, Civil Rights, Legal Education and Admission to the Bar, and the Executive Committee. He also served as chairman of the board of the Association's pro bono initiative, Volunteers of Legal Service (VOLS). He served as the City Bar's first African-American president from 1990 to 1992, where he worked to increase ethnic and gender diversity within the Association's committees and governance. Harper was a member of a number of other bar associations, including the Metropolitan Black Bar Association, American Bar Association, and the New York State Bar Association.

From 2000 to 2005, Harper served as the first African-American member of the Harvard Corporation, the highest governing body of Harvard University. In 2005, he controversially resigned from the board in protest over the leadership and high salary of Harvard President Lawrence Summers, releasing a statement saying “I have reached the judgment that I can no longer support the president, and therefore I have resigned from the Corporation.”

Harper has served on the board of trustees of a number of prominent cultural and political organizations, including the New York Public Library, the Museum of the City of New York, and the New York Urban League. He has also served as Chancellor of the Episcopal Diocese of New York and as Legal Adviser of the Department of State. Harper was elected to the American Academy of Arts and Sciences in 1992 and the American Philosophical Society in 2002.

== Law reform work ==
Harper is a longtime member of the American Law Institute and was elected to the ALI Council in 1985. He served as the Institute's First Vice President from 2000 to 2004, and as Second Vice President from 1998 to 2000. He has served as an Adviser on several ALI law reform projects, including Recognition & Enforcement of Foreign Judgments, and Transnational Rules of Civil Procedure. He currently serves as a Counselor on the Restatement Fourth, The Foreign Relations Law of the United States.

== Sources ==
- The Committee to Celebrate Black History Month. “Conrad K. Harper.” Pioneering African-Americans in the Courts and Legal Community Past and Present New York, NY: Privately Published, February 1992. P. 8
- “I Can No Longer Support the President.” Harvard Magazine. September, 2005.
- “A Harvard Governor, Dissatisfied, Resigns.” The New York Times. July 29, 2005.
- Morris, Jeffrey B. “Making Sure We are True to Our Founders”: The Association of the Bar of the City of New York, 1980-1995. New York, NY: Fordham University Press, 1997. ISBN 0-8232-1738-8
