= Robert McKay (lawyer) =

American legal academic

Robert B. McKay (August 11, 1919 – July 13, 1990) was a dean of New York University Law School, a former president of the New York City Bar Association, and the chair of McKay Commission, which investigated the 1971 Attica Prison riot.

== Early life and education ==
McKay was born in Wichita, Kansas in 1919, and received his Bachelor of Arts degree from the University of Kansas in 1940, and his Juris Doctor from Yale Law School. McKay joined the United States Army three months before the attack on Pearl Harbor as a private, and served in the Philippines. He was discharged as a captain.

== Career ==
From 1947 to 1950, McKay was a lawyer for the United States Department of Justice. From 1950 to 1953, he taught law at Emory University before joining the faculty of New York University in 1953. There, he became an expert on United States Constitutional Law and legislative reapportionment. He served as dean of the law school from 1967 to 1975.

In 1972, McKay led the McKay Commission, a panel charged with investigating the causes of the 1971 riot at Attica Correctional Facility in Attica, New York. The commission was critical of Governor Nelson A. Rockefeller for not visiting the prison before ordering an armed assault on the facility, and was also critical of state prison authorities for not having proper procedures in place to respond to riots. But after a whistle-blower revealed possible collusion involving Rockefeller, State Police, and state prosecutors to obstruct prosecution of the reckless use of deadly force and torture of inmates by law enforcement, McKay in 1976 urged Gov. Hugh Carey "'to stop the never-ending investigations.'"

From 1975 onwards, McKay worked primarily for the Aspen Institute, a well-known think tank.

== Civic involvement ==
McKay served in a number of prominent positions in civic life, including chairman of the New York Civil Liberties Union, president of the Legal Aid Society, and chairman of the Citizens Union.

From 1984 to 1986, McKay served as president of the New York City Bar Association. In his work for the Bar, McKay was a strong proponent of requiring mandatory Continuing Legal Education for lawyers and mandatory pro bono work by practicing attorneys.

He was the recipient of numerous awards, including the William Nelson Cromwell Medal of the New York County Lawyers Association in 1973, the Justice Award of the American Judicature Society in 1986, the Gold Medal of the Bar Association of the City of New York in 1987, and the Servant of Justice Award of the Legal Aid Society in March.

== Death ==
McKay died of a heart attack in Reno, Nevada on July 13, 1990. He had been scheduled to address the National Judicial College there the following day.
