= New York City Bar Association =

Association of lawyers in New York City

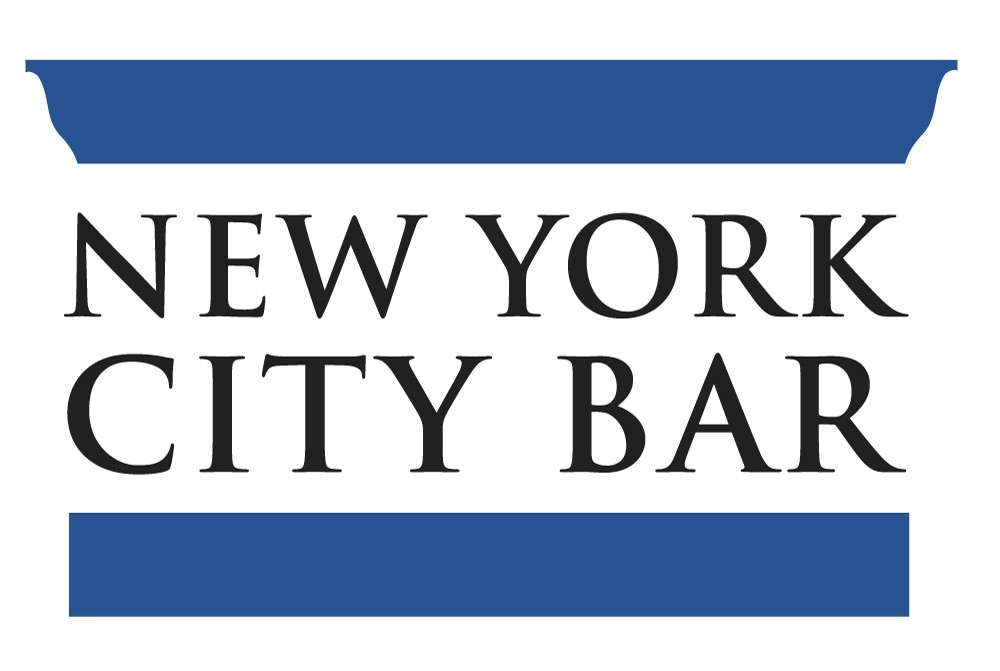
- Formation: 1870
- Type: Legal society
- Headquarters: New York City, New York
- Location: United States
- President: Matthew Diller
- Website: www.nycbar.org

The Association of the Bar of the City of New York, commonly referred to as the New York City Bar Association (City Bar), founded in 1870, is a voluntary association of lawyers and law students. Since 1896, the organization has been headquartered in a landmark building on 44th Street, between Fifth and Sixth Avenues in Manhattan. Today the City Bar has more than 23,000 members. Its current president, Matthew Diller, began his two-year term in May 2026.

== History ==
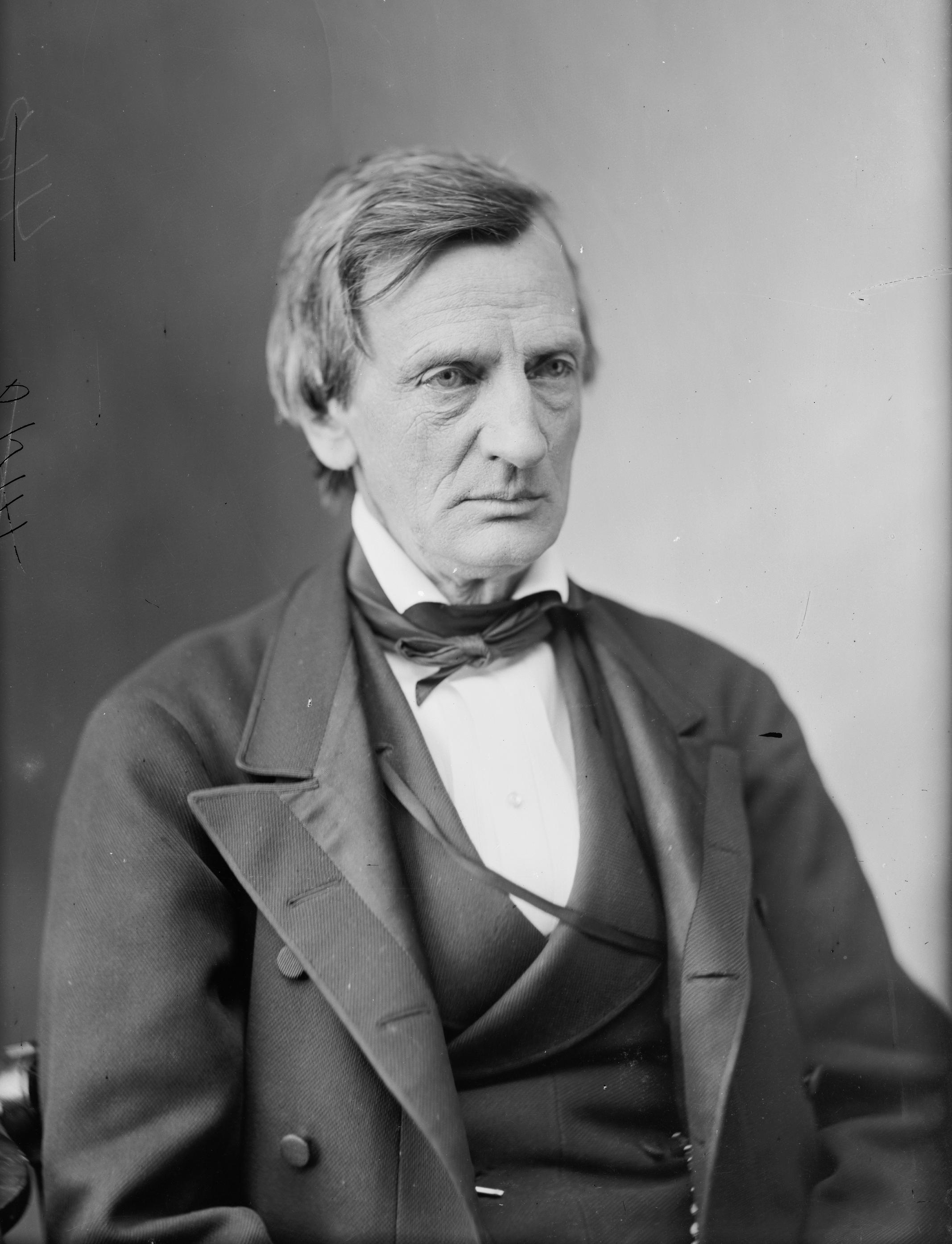
Portrait of William M. Evarts, the first president of the New York City Bar Association

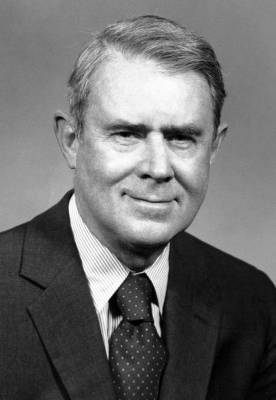
Cyrus Vance, president of the Bar from 1974 to 1976

The Association of the Bar of the City of New York (now known as the New York City Bar Association) was founded in 1870 in response to growing public concern over corruption among judges and lawyers in New York City. Several of its early officers, including William M. Evarts and Samuel Tilden, were active in seeking the removal of corrupt judges and in leading prosecutions of the notorious Tweed Ring. It counted many of the country's most prominent lawyers among its officers, including Elihu Root, Charles Evans Hughes, and Samuel Seabury.

By the 1960s, under the leadership of presidents Bernard Botein and Francis T. P. Plimpton, the association became an increasingly democratic organization, easing restrictions on membership and actively engaging in social issues. The association hosted Dr. Martin Luther King Jr. and Chief Justice Earl Warren, among others, and actively campaigned for initiatives such as the Equal Rights Amendment. It also played an important role in two controversial confirmation battles in the United States Supreme Court, over nominees G. Harrold Carswell in 1970 and Robert Bork in 1987.

Since the 1980s, it has continued to diversify its membership with active recruitment efforts among women and minorities and to expand its involvement in access to justice initiatives, international human rights, and pro bono representation in many areas, including immigration, AIDS, homelessness, and criminal justice.

Since 1896, the association has been housed in its six-story landmark building at 42 West 44th Street.

== Activities ==
=== Committees and public policy ===
The City Bar has over 160 committees that focus on legal practice areas and issues. Through reports, amicus briefs, testimony, statements and letters drafted by committee members, the City Bar comments on public policy and legislation. The City Bar's Policy department acts as a liaison between the committees and the New York State Legislature and New York City Council.

Examples of committee activity and issue areas include:

Business/corporate

- Report: The Enforceability and Effectiveness of Typical Shareholders Agreement Provisions (February 2010)
- Statement to the Obama transition team on financial regulation. (December 2008)

Civil liberties/security

- Letter to U.S. Senators opposing a provision in the National Defense Authorization Act for Fiscal Year 2011 that would require the Inspector General of the Department of Defense to investigate lawyers representing Guantanamo detainees in habeas corpus proceedings or military commissions. (May 2010)
- Amicus Brief: Hamdan v. Rumsfeld, before the U.S. Supreme Court (January 2006)
- Report: The Indefinite Detention of "Enemy Combatants": Balancing Due Process and National Security in the Context of the War on Terror (February 2004)

Consumer affairs

- Report calling on regulatory offices, the judiciary, the organized bar and the process service industry to work together to reform process service in New York City. (May 2010)
- Report in support of the Consumer Credit Fairness Act, which would strengthen consumer protections in consumer debt collection proceedings. (April 2010)

Government reform

- 2014 State Legislation Agenda: representing a portion of the dozens of positions generated by City Bar committees over the course of each legislative session. (February 2014)
- Report: Reforming New York State's Financial Disclosure Requirements for Attorney-Legislators (February 2010)
- Report on Community Benefit Agreements in New York City, urging the City to define a clear policy for considering agreements during the land use approval process for development projects. (March 2010)
- Report identifying issues New York City's Charter Revision Commission should address and encouraging the Commission to conduct a deliberate examination of the entire Charter, and the principles underlying it, in detail. (April 2010)

International

- Report of the Mission to China of the Association of the Bar of the City of New York (December 2009)
- Report on the Hague Convention on Choice of Court Agreements (September 2006)
- Report: The Prevention and Prosecution of Terrorist Acts: A Survey of Multilateral Instruments (June 2006)
- Report: Human Rights Standards Applicable to the United States' Interrogation of Detainees (April 2004)

=== Notable events ===
The City Bar produces hundreds of events per year, most of them through its committees. These have included:

- Supreme Court Justices Ruth Bader Ginsburg and Sonia Sotomayor are interviewed by Charlie Rose in the inaugural event of the Barbara Paul Robinson Series. (October 25, 2016)
- Sally Yates, former U.S. Deputy Attorney General, gave a keynote address at the White Collar Crime Institute. U.S. Attorney for the E.D.N.Y. Robert L. Capers gave the other keynote. (May 10, 2016)
- United Nations Secretary-General Ban Ki-moon delivered a speech on the 2030 Agenda for Sustainable Development and the role of the United Nations and the legal community in achieving Goal 16 over the next 15 years. (April 2016)
- Supreme Court Justice Elena Kagan delivered the annual Justice Ruth Bader Ginsburg Distinguished Lecture on Women and the Law, entitled "Justice Ginsburg's Greatest Hits." (February 2014)
- A forum was held with the New York City Mayoral Candidates, including future Mayor Bill de Blasio. (June 2013)
- Chen Guangcheng, Chinese legal activist and Distinguished Visitor at NYU Law School's U.S.-Asia Law Institute, was presented with City Bar Honorary Membership. (February 2013)
- Harold Hongju Koh, former Legal Adviser to the U.S. Department of State, spoke on "International Lawyering for the U.S. Government in an Age of Smart Power." (November 2012)
- Hon. Louise Arbour was elected to Honorary Membership "in recognition of her courageous commitment to justice as Chief Prosecutor for the International Criminal Tribunal for the former Yugoslavia and for Rwanda, and for her unwavering leadership as United Nations High Commissioner for Human Rights." (May 2012)
- The first legal clinic for the reopened September 11th Victim Compensation Fund was held at the City Bar. (November 2011)
- Under-Secretary-General of the United Nations, and President of Chile, Michelle Bachelet reported on the progress of gender equality and empowerment of women. (June 2011)
- Leaders of nearly two dozen New York bar associations gathered at the City Bar to urge that legislation be passed to end discrimination against same-sex couples who wish to marry in New York. (May 2011)
- Preet Bharara, United States Attorney for the Southern District of New York, delivered a lecture on the future of white collar criminal enforcement. (October 20, 2010)
- Retired U.S. Supreme Court Justice Sandra Day O'Connor delivered the annual Arps Lecture at the City Bar, speaking on the topics of judicial independence and civic education. (April 5, 2010)
- Robert Khuzami, Director of the Securities and Exchange Commission's Division of Enforcement, gave his first major policy speech at the New York City Bar. (August 5, 2009)
- Pulitzer Prize-winning journalist Linda Greenhouse delivered the Justice Ruth Bader Ginsburg Distinguished Lecture on Women and the Law. (November 18, 2008)
- Honorary membership was presented to Pakistan's former Chief Justice Iftikhar Muhammad Chaudhry, who had become a symbol of the movement for judicial and lawyer independence in Pakistan. (November 17, 2008)
- John Lennon held a press conference in the City Bar's Stimson Room on April Fool's Day to respond to the U.S. government's efforts to deport him as a "strategic countermeasure" to his mounting criticisms of U.S. policy in Southeast Asia. At the press conference, Lennon produces a "birth announcement" for Nutopia, "a new conceptual country with no laws other than the cosmic," where anyone could be a citizen merely by thinking about it. (April 1, 1973)
- Dr. Martin Luther King Jr. gave a speech in the City Bar's Meeting Hall on "The Civil Rights Struggle in the United States Today." (April 21, 1965)

=== Member services ===
The City Bar's member services include career development workshops; networking events; a Small Law Firm Center; the Lawyer Assistance Program, which provides free counseling for members and their families struggling with substance abuse or mental health issues; a law library; discounts on Continuing Legal Education courses; insurance and other benefits; and contact info for the City Bar's 25,000 members.

=== Continuing legal education ===
The City Bar Center for Continuing Legal Education is an accredited provider in the States of New York, New Jersey, California and Illinois, offering over 150 live programs a year, as well as audio and video tapes, for members and non-members.

=== Pro bono and access to justice ===
Through its nonprofit affiliates, the City Bar Justice Center and the Cyrus R. Vance Center for International Justice, the City Bar provides pro bono legal services in New York City and supports the creation and expansion of pro bono and access to justice in other countries.

=== Legal Referral Service ===
The New York City Bar Legal Referral Service (LRS) is one of the oldest legal referral and information services in the country, and was the first one in New York approved by the American Bar Association. The NYC Bar LRS is currently a department of the NYC Bar Association, but was originally founded as a joint effort between New York City Bar Association (est.1870) and the New York County Lawyers' Association (est. 1908) in 1946 to assist World War II veterans and their families.

The LRS is one of the few legal referral and information services in the United States to have both attorneys and non-attorneys answering calls and responding to online requests. The LRS referral counselors first help clients determine if they will benefit from working with a lawyer, and then refer potential clients to vetted and experienced lawyers listed with the LRS and/or to other more helpful or cost-effective resources. While there is no charge to speak with LRS staff members, if a potential client is referred by the LRS to a vetted and qualified LRS lawyer, they will be asked to pay the LRS $35 for the initial consultation with the participating LRS lawyer—although there are a few discrete areas of law where initial consultation fees are waived. An initial consultation may last up to 30 minutes, and if the potential client requests further consultation or representation by the lawyer, the lawyer and the client will work out the fee arrangement between themselves. The LRS has no role in determining fee arrangements or rates that its participating lawyers charge.

The LRS, along with the City Bar Justice Center, also serves the public by sponsoring the New York City Bar Association's Monday Night Law Program, which provides free client consultations in a few areas of the law: Bankruptcy, Consumer Law, Employment, Landlord-Tenant, and Divorce, Matrimonial and Family Law. These free 30-minute consultations are by appointment only and take place in person on Mondays, 5:30 PM-7:30 PM, at the New York City Bar Association building (October-August). Monday Night Law volunteer lawyers can only provide advice related to those areas of law and do not provide any ongoing representation or guidance.

=== Evaluation of judicial candidates ===
The City Bar's Judiciary Committee evaluates candidates for judgeships on New York City's courts, and announces its finding of either "Approved" or "Not Approved."

The City Bar's Executive Committee, working with the Judiciary Committee and the Committee on State Courts of Superior Jurisdiction, evaluates candidates for New York's highest court, the Court of Appeals, issuing a finding of "Well Qualified, "Not Well Qualified" or "Exceptionally Well Qualified."

The Executive Committee, working with the Judiciary Committee, also considers the qualifications of the President's nominees to serve on the U.S. Supreme Court, issuing a finding of "Qualified," "Unqualified," or "Highly Qualified."

=== National Moot Court Competition ===
The City Bar has sponsored the National Moot Court Competition in conjunction with the American College of Trial Lawyers since 1950. Over 150 law schools compete each year in the regional rounds throughout the United States. The winners advance to the final rounds, which are held at the House of the association.

== Awards ==
Association Medal
Established in 1951, this award is presented periodically to a member of the New York Bar who has made exceptional contributions to the honor and standing of the bar in the community. The first Association Medal was awarded to Hon. Robert P. Patterson, posthumously, in 1952.
Bernard Botein Medal
The Bernard Botein Medal is awarded annually to Court Attaches "for outstanding contributions to the administration of the courts." The award is meant to recognize members of the personnel attached to the courts of the First Judicial Department. The award is in memory of Bernard Botein, a former Presiding Justice of the Appellate Division and a former President of the City Bar.
Henry L. Stimson Medal
The Henry L. Stimson Medal is presented annually to outstanding Assistant U.S. Attorneys in the Southern District and in the Eastern District of New York. The medal is awarded in honor of Henry L. Stimson, who served as U.S. Attorney for the Southern District from 1906–1909 and as President of the City Bar from 1937–1939.
Thomas E. Dewey Medal
The Thomas E. Dewey Medal is presented annually to an outstanding Assistant District Attorney in each of the city's D.A. offices. Among prosecutors in New York County, Thomas E. Dewey is remembered as having ushered in the era of staffing the District Attorney's office with professional prosecutors chosen on merit rather than political patronage. Dewey first made a name for himself as a prosecutor in the 1930s, instituting successful criminal proceedings against bootleggers and organized crime figures. By 1937, Dewey was elected District Attorney of New York County, where he served one term before resigning to run for governor.
Minority Fellowship in Environmental Law
The Minority Fellowship in Environmental Law is a joint program of the City Bar and the New York State Bar Association. It was established to encourage minorities to enter the area of environmental law by providing selected minority law students with grants for summer internships in governmental environmental agencies or nonprofit organizations, and participation in activities of the City Bar's Committee on Environmental Law and the Environmental Law Section of the New York State Bar Association.
Thurgood Marshall Fellowship
The Thurgood Marshall Fellowship Program was established in 1993 to provide three exceptional minority law students with the opportunity to work with the City Bar to advance the goals of civil rights and equal justice that are Thurgood Marshall's legacy.
Legal Services Awards
The Legal Services Awards were established to recognize the efforts of attorneys who provide critical civil legal assistance to underprivileged people in New York City.
Katherine A. McDonald Award
The Katherine A. McDonald Award recognizes the vital services of attorneys who work in the Family Court in New York City.
Municipal Affairs Awards
The Municipal Affairs Awards were established to recognize outstanding achievement as an Assistant Corporation Counsel.

== Leadership and governance ==
The City Bar is governed by the Office of the President and a Board of Directors, consisting of the president, three vice presidents, a treasurer, a secretary and 16 members. The president serves a term of two years, and the Board of Directors is divided equally into four classes of staggered four-year terms.

City Bar Presidents

- Matthew Diller: 2026–present
- Muhammad U. Faridi: 2024–2026
- Susan J. Kohlmann: 2022–2024
- Sheila S. Boston: 2020–2022
- Roger Juan Maldonado: 2018–2020
- John S. Kiernan: 2016–2018
- Debra L. Raskin: 2014–2016
- Carey R. Dunne: 2012–2014
- Samuel W. Seymour: 2010–2012
- Patricia M. Hynes: 2008–2010
- Barry M. Kamins: 2006–2008
- Bettina B. Plevan: 2004–2006
- E. Leo Milonas: 2002–2004
- Evan A. Davis: 2000–2002
- Michael A. Cooper: 1998–2000
- Michael A. Cardozo: 1996–1998
- Barbara Paul Robinson: 1994–1996
- John D. Feerick: 1992–1994
- Conrad K. Harper: 1990–1992
- Sheldon Oliensis: 1988–1990
- Robert M. Kaufman: 1986–1988
- Robert B. McKay: 1984–1986
- Louis A. Craco: 1982–1984
- Oscar M. Ruebhausen: 1980–1982
- Merrell E. Clark Jr.: 1978–1980
- Adrian W. DeWind: 1976–1978
- Cyrus R. Vance: 1974–1976
- Orville Schell: 1972–1974
- Bernard Botein: 1970–1972
- Francis T. P. Plimpton: 1968–1970
- Russell D. Niles: 1966–1968
- Samuel I. Rosenman: 1964–1966
- Herbert Brownell: 1962–1964
- Orison Marden: 1960–1962
- Dudley B. Bonsal: 1958–1960
- Louis M. Loeb: 1956–1958
- Allen T. Klots: 1954–1956
- Bethuel M. Webster: 1952–1954
- Whitney North Seymour: 1950–1952
- Robert P. Patterson: 1948–1950
- Harrison Tweed: 1945–1948
- Allen Wardwell: 1943–1945
- William D. Mitchell: 1941–1943
- Samuel Seabury: 1939–1941
- Henry L. Stimson: 1937–1939
- Clarence J. Shearn: 1935–1937
- Thomas D. Thacher: 1933–1935
- John W. Davis: 1931–1933
- Charles Culp Burlingham: 1929–1931
- Charles Evans Hughes: 1927–1929
- William D. Guthrie: 1925–1927
- Henry W. Taft: 1923–1925
- James Byrne: 1921–1923
- John G. Milburn: 1919–1920
- George L. Ingraham: 1917–1918
- George W. Wickersham: 1914–1916
- William B. Hornblower: 1913–1914
- Lewis Cass Ledyard: 1912
- Francis Lynde Stetson: 1910–1911
- Edmund Wetmore: 1908–1909
- John L. Cadwalader: 1906–1907
- Elihu Root: 1904–1905
- William Gardner Choate: 1902–1903
- John E. Parsons: 1900–1901
- James C. Carter: 1897–1899
- Joseph Larocque: 1895–1896
- Wheeler H. Peckham: 1892–1894
- Frederic René Coudert Sr.: 1890–1891
- Joseph H. Choate: 1888–1889
- William Allen Butler: 1886–1887
- James C. Carter: 1884–1885
- Francis N. Bangs: 1882–1883
- Stephen P. Nash: 1880–1881
- William M. Evarts: 1870–1879

== See also ==
- Bar Association
- City Bar Justice Center
- History of the New York City Bar Association
- House of the New York City Bar Association
- National Moot Court Competition
- New York State Bar Association (NYSBA)
