= Allen T. Klots =

American lawyer

Allen Trafford Klots, Sr. (September 14, 1889 – January 1, 1965) was a New York City lawyer and president of the New York City Bar Association.

== Biography ==
Allen T. Klots was born in Brooklyn, New York, on September 14, 1889, to Charles A. Klots. He attended Yale University, where he was elected to Phi Beta Kappa and was a member of Skull and Bones, and Harvard Law School, where he was an editor of the Harvard Law Review.

Klots graduated from Harvard University in 1913, and joined Henry Stimson's firm of Winthrop & Stimson that same year as a clerk. However, he left two years later to serve with the National Guard on the Mexican border during the Pancho Villa Expedition. In 1916, he was deployed to France for service with the 77th division of the American Expeditionary Force in World War I. After being slightly wounded, Klots was reappointed to the 305th Field Artillery Regiment as an adjutant to Stimson.

After the war, Klots remained in France for another year on the staff if the American Relief Administration in Paris.

=== Career ===
Klots returned to the United States in 1921, and was made a partner at Winthrop & Stimson. In 1929, he followed Stimson to the State Department when Stimson was appointed Secretary of State by President Herbert Hoover, and there he served as Stimson's assistant. Among his assignments was the gathering of information on the Soviet Union and investigating Japanese incursions into China.

He married and had a son, Allen Trafford Klots, Jr. (1921–1987).

He returned to Winthrop & Stimson in 1932, and remained at the firm as a partner for the rest of his career. He worked extensively with the New York City Bar Association. In 1948, he headed a committee on Congressional investigations that published a report urging reforms to investigating procedures in response to the excesses of the House Un-American Activities Committee. He served as president of the City Bar from 1954 to 1955.

Klots also advocated for reform of the New York Court System, arguing that judges on New York's Supreme Court and Court of Appeals should be appointed by the Governor rather than elected. In 1956, he was appointed by Mayor Robert F. Wagner, Jr. as chairman of the Mayor's Committee on the Courts in 1956, where he served for three years and contributed significantly to the eventual restructuring of the New York City court system in 1972. As a member of the New York City Bar Association's Steering Committee, Klots advocated for similar court reforms on the state level. These reforms were ultimately passed into law in 1977, when voters ratified three proposed court restructuring amendments to the New York State Constitution.

In addition to his legal career, Klots served as mayor of Laurel Hollow, Long Island, and as a director of the chemical manufacturing company Scheiflin & Co.

Allen Klots died of a heart attack on January 1, 1965, at his home in Laurel Hollow, Long Island. He was 75 years old.
