= Bernard Botein =

American judge (1900–1974)

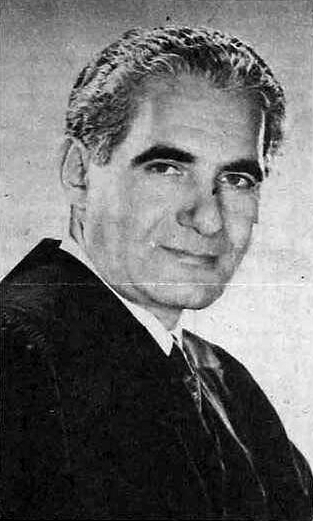
- Botein c. 1942
- Born: May 6, 1900; New York City, New York
- Died: February 3, 1974 (aged 73); New York City
- Resting place: City College of New York; Brooklyn Law School
- Occupation: judge
- Employer: New York Court of Appeals
- Spouse: Marian Berman Botein
- Children: Michael Botein (1945-2016)

Bernard Botein (May 6, 1900 – February 3, 1974) was a prominent New York City lawyer and judge, a legal reformer, a presiding justice of the New York State Supreme Court, Appellate Division, First Department, and a president of the New York City Bar Association.

== Early life ==
Bernard Botein was born to a German Jewish family on New York's Lower East Side on May 6, 1900. His father died when he was six, and he worked various jobs throughout his youth to support his family and pay for his education, including flower deliveryman, newspaper carrier, and clerk in an insurance office. He served as a private in the United States Army during World War I. He attended Morris High School in the Bronx, City College of New York, and Brooklyn Law School.

== Career ==
=== Assistant district attorney ===
In 1929, Botein was hired as assistant district attorney in Manhattan, where he served as head of the Accident Fraud Bureau and brought over 200 prosecutions against ambulance chasing lawyers, doctors and professional accident victims. In 1938, Governor Herbert H. Lehman appointed Botein general counsel for the State Insurance Fund, where he headed an investigation that led to the conviction of 18 auditors for bribery and the dismissal of 40 others for violation of the New York Civil Service Code. In 1940, as the head of another special investigation, Botein uncovered fraud and waste in the awarding of state printing contracts, leading to 14 possible prosecutions, the disqualification of two companies from receiving state contracts, and a report recommending a cost-saving reorganization of the state's printing procedures.

=== Judge ===
In 1941 Botein was appointed by Lehman to the New York State Supreme Court, where he presided over a number of high-profile cases, including the ordering of a special election following the resignation New York City Mayor William O'Dwyer. In 1953, Governor Thomas Dewey appointed Botein to the Appellate Division of the New York State Supreme Court, First Department, located in Manhattan, and in 1958 Governor W. Averell Harriman named him the presiding judge. As Presiding Justice of the Appellate Division First Department, he instituted a 24-hour arraignment system to shorten the time defendants spent in police lock-up. He was also an enthusiastic supporter of the system of releasing a defendant on his own recognizance until trial. In 1962, he played an important role in the reorganization of the courts under a centralized court system of administration overseen by the justices of the Court of Appeals. He served as presiding judge until his retirement from the bench in 1968.

=== Botein, Hays, Sklar & Herzberg, and the NYC Bar Association ===
After 1968, Botein joined newly named Botein, Hays, Sklar & Herzberg, practicing law privately with the Midtown New York City law firm, after spending 27 years as a judge. He was the lead partner. Future federal district court and court of appeals judge Stanley Marcus joined the firm as an associate in 1974.

From 1970 to 1972, he also served as president of the New York City Bar Association. As president of the Bar, Botein was instrumental in making it more accessible to younger lawyers and making its decision process more democratic. He drafted new bylaws allowing Bar members to vote by referendum on policy positions of "general interest" to the membership, taking the power over positions out of the hands of small number of committee members. He also helped introduce new committees to the Bar, including the Sex and the Law Committee which became a prominent advocate of the Equal Rights Amendment.

== Death ==
Bernard Botein died from heart failure at Lenox Hill Hospital in Manhattan on February 3, 1974.

== Sources ==
=== Books ===
- Botein, Bernard. Trial Judge: The Candid, Behind-the-Bench Story of Justice. New York: Simon & Schuster, 1952. ISBN 0-306-70630-X
- Morris, Jeffrey B. "Making Sure We are True to Our Founders": The Association of the Bar of the City of New York, 1980-1995. New York, NY: Fordham University Press, 1997. ISBN 0-8232-1738-8

=== Newspapers ===
- "Bernard Botein, 73, Dies." The New York Times. February 4, 1974.
- "Innovator on the Bench; Bernard Botein." The New York Times. March 26, 1966.
- "Mr. Presiding Justice; Bernard Botein." The New York Times. October 1, 1957.
- "Reshaper of Courts, Bernard Botein." The New York Times. September 17, 1968.

== Published work ==
- Botein, Bernard. Our Cities Burn While We Play Cops and Robbers. New York: Simon & Schuster, 1972. ISBN 0-671-21269-9
- Botein, Bernard. The Prosecutor: A Novel. New York: Simon & Schuster, 1956. ASIN B0007E1YF4
- Botein, Bernard. Trial Judge: The Candid, Behind-the-Bench Story of Justice. New York: Simon & Schuster, 1952. ISBN 0-306-70630-X
- Botein, Bernard and Murray Gordon. The Trial of the Future: Challenge to the Law. New York: Simon & Schuster, 1963. ASIN B000ZQAATK

== External resources ==
- Biography of Bernard Botein on the Website of the New York State Unified Court System
- The Papers of Bernard Botein at the New York Historical Society
