= Charles Culp Burlingham =

American lawyer

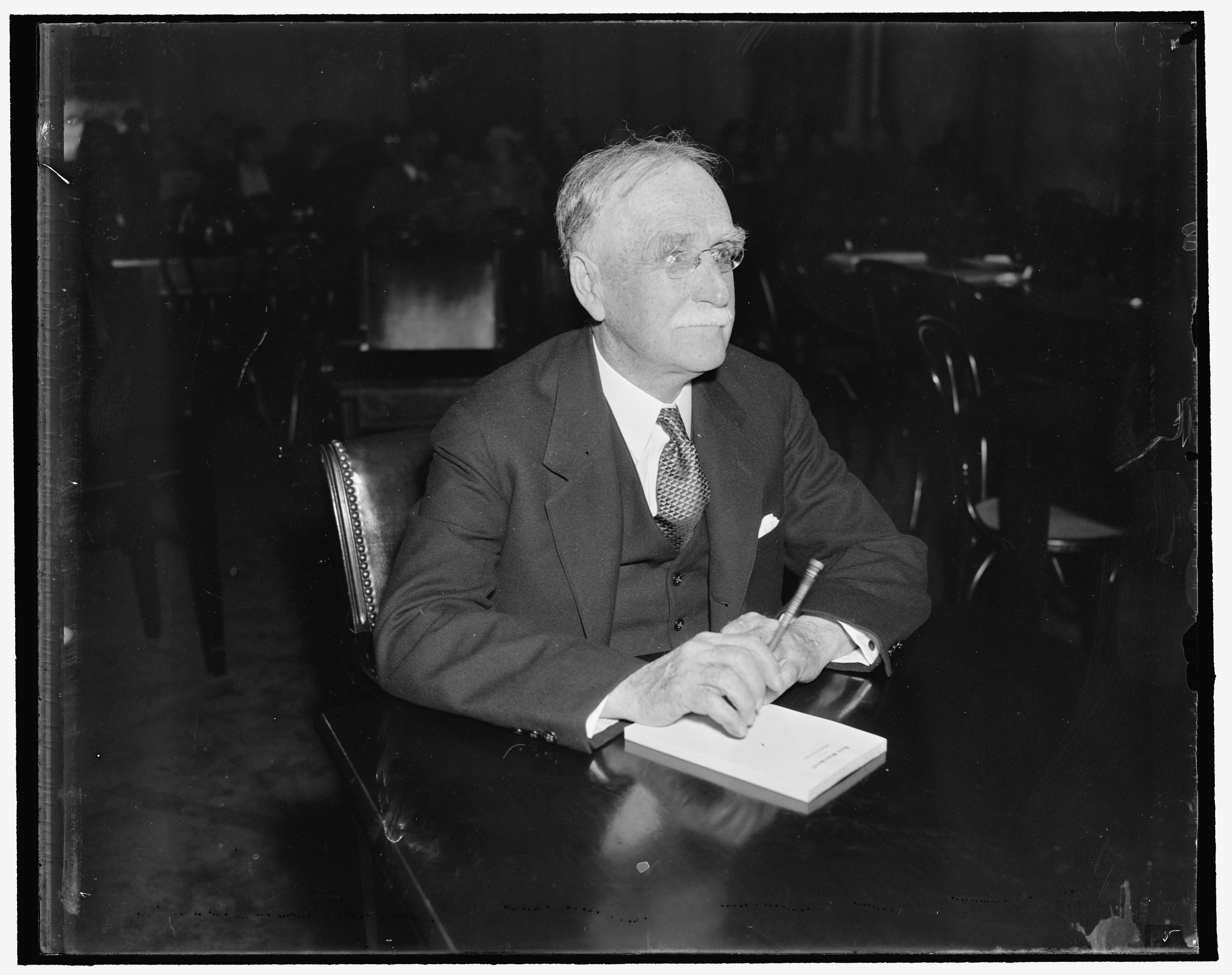
Burlingham in 1937

Charles Culp Burlingham (August 31, 1858 – June 6, 1959) was a prominent New York City lawyer, legal reformer, and president of the New York City Bar Association.

== Early life and education ==
Charles Culp Burlingham was born in Plainfield, New Jersey, on August 31, 1858. He was the son of the Reverend Aaron Hale and Emma Starr Burlingham. He received his Bachelor of Arts degree from Harvard University in 1879, and he received a Bachelor of Laws degree from Columbia University in 1881 (he received an honorary Juris Doctor degree from Columbia in 1933).

== Career ==
=== Private practice ===
Burlingham was admitted to the New York bar in 1881. He became a leader in the field of admiralty law, and took up private practice in a series of partnerships, eventually becoming lead partner in the firm Burlingham, Veeder, Masten, & Feary, a precursor to the modern firm of Burlingham Underwood LLP, which closed in 2002.

Charles Burlingham represented a number of prominent clients through his firm, including the Holland America Line, Anchor Line, Nippon Yusen, and other shipping lines in North America, South America, and Europe. His most famous client in private practice was White Star Line, which he successfully represented before the United States Supreme Court in 1912, following the sinking of the RMS Titanic. The case resulted in a landmark ruling that American laws were applicable to foreign shipping firms facing lawsuits in United States courts, and limited the total liability of the company to $91,000 in lawsuits brought by the families of Titanic passengers.

=== Civic involvement ===
Burlingham was best known for his involvement in civic and legal reform in New York City, a commitment which earned him the nickname “first citizen of New York.” After being admitted to the bar, he served in leadership positions in a number of prominent civic organizations. He joined the New York City Board of Education in 1897, and served as the Board’s president from 1902 to 1903.

In addition, he served as president of the Welfare Council of New York City, the Harvard Alumni Association, the Columbia Alumni Association, and as a warden of St. George’s Episcopal Church. His expertise in maritime law led him to become a prominent member of the Maritime Law Association of the United States and the Comite Maritime International. He also served as a member of the New York County Lawyers Association, the American Law Institute, and the New York State Bar Association.

Burlingham was a prominent participant in New York City judicial and electoral politics, and his influence was instrumental in beginning the legal careers of, among others, Benjamin Cardozo and Learned Hand. He was also a friend and close adviser to New York City Mayor Fiorello LaGuardia.

From 1929 to 1931, Burlingham served as president of the New York City Bar Association.

== Death ==
Charles Culp Burlingham died on June 6, 1959, in New York City.

== Sources ==
=== Books ===
- Martin, George. “CCB: The Life and Century of Charles C. Burlingham, New York’s First Citizen.” New York, NY: Hill and Wang, 2005. ISBN 0-8090-7317-X
- Burlingham, Michael John. "The Last Tiffany: A Biography of Dorothy Tiffany Burlingham," New York, NY: Atheneum, 1989. ISBN 0-689-11870-8

=== Newspapers ===
- “Charles Burlingham Dies at 100; Lawyer Fought for Civic Reform.” The New York Times. June 8, 1959.
- Felix Frankfurter. “A Legal Tryptic.” The Harvard Law Review. Vol. 74, No. 3. January 1961.
- “98 YEARS NEARING FOR BURLINGHAM; Lawyer and Civic Leader in High Spirits in Comment on Birthday Tomorrow.” The New York Times. August 30, 1956.
- “Mr. Burlingham’s Centennial.” The New York Times. August 31, 1958.
- “Puts Titanic Suits Under Limited Law.” The New York Times. May 26, 1914.

== External sources ==
- Charles Culp Burlingham Papers at Harvard University
- Charles Culp Burlingham Biography on the New York Archive Project
- Papers of Burlingham Underwood LLP at Harvard Law School
- “Reminiscences of Charles Culp Burlingham,” at the Columbia University Oral History Project.
