= Oscar M. Ruebhausen =

American lawyer (1912–2004)

- Born: August 28, 1912; New York City, U.S.
- Died: December 7, 2004 (aged 92); New York City, U.S.
- Education: Dartmouth College (BA); Yale University (JD)
- Occupation: Lawyer

Oscar M. Ruebhausen (August 28, 1912 – December 7, 2004) was an American lawyer, adviser to Governor Nelson A. Rockefeller, and president of the New York City Bar Association.

== Early life and education ==
Oscar Ruebhausen was born in Manhattan on August 28, 1912, and was raised in Vermont. He attended Dartmouth College, where he graduated summa cum laude, and Yale Law School, where he was notes editor of the Yale Law Journal.

== Career ==
In 1937, Ruebhausen joined the law firm Debevoise, Stevenson, Plimpton & Page, a precursor to the modern firm of Debevoise & Plimpton.

Ruebhausen was exempted from military service during World War II for health reasons, but in 1941 he moved to Washington, D.C. to work for the Lend-Lease Administration financing material aid for the Allied war effort in Europe. In 1944, he became general counsel to the Office of Scientific Research and Development (OSRD), headed by the engineer Vannevar Bush. That year, at the request of President Franklin D. Roosevelt, Ruebhausen helped Bush draft a letter on how scientific research could be useful to the United States in peacetime. The letter became the blueprint for the establishment of the National Science Foundation in 1950.

After the war, Ruebhausen returned to practice at Debevoise & Plimpton, where he remained until his retirement in 1987. From 1950 to 1951, he also served as counsel to the International Development Advisory Board, where he began a lifelong relationship with Nelson A. Rockefeller, the organization's chairman, as a friend and political adviser. When Rockefeller became Governor of New York, Ruebhausen served him in a number of capacities, including as chairman of a Task Force on Protection from Radioactive Fallout, as Special Adviser on Atomic Energy, and as chairman of a panel on Insurance Holding Companies.

Ruebhausen also maintained a long relationship with the New York City Bar Association, where he served as president from 1980 to 1982. In keeping with his professional interest in science, he served as chairman of the Association's Special Committee on Atomic Energy from 1949 to 1959 and as chair of the Committee on Science and the Law from 1959 to 1967.

== Personal life and death ==
Ruebhausen married Zelia K. Peet in 1942. He was widowed when she died in 1990. Oscar Ruebhausen died on December 7, 2004, at New York Presbyterian Hospital in Manhattan. He was 92 years old.

== Sources ==
- Morris, Jeffrey B. "Making Sure We are True to Our Founders": The Association of the Bar of the City of New York, 1980-1995. New York, NY: Fordham University Press, 1997. ISBN 0-8232-1738-8
- "Oscar M. Ruebhausen, 92, Former Rockefeller Adviser, is Dead." The New York Times. December 12, 2004.
- Oscar M. Ruebhausen Biography, Yale Law School
