= Sheldon Oliensis =

American lawyer

Sheldon Oliensis (March 19, 1922 – May 14, 2001) was a New York City lawyer, a president of the Legal Aid Society, and a president of the New York City Bar Association.

== Early life and education ==
Sheldon Oliensis was born in Philadelphia on March 19, 1922. He attended the University of Pennsylvania and Harvard Law School, where he was president of the Harvard Law Review.

== Career ==
After a period of practice with another firm, Oliensis joined Kaye Scholer in 1960 as a litigation partner.

In addition to his private practice, Oliensis was highly involved in public service. He was a longtime member of the New York City Bar Association, where he chaired a number of committees, including the Grievance Committee, the Executive Committee and the Committee on Access to Legal Services. He served a president of the Bar from 1988 to 1990, and he was instrumental in establishing Volunteers of Legal Service (VOLS), the Bar's pro bono legal service organization.

He was also a president of the Legal Aid Society from 1973 to 1975, was chair of the New York City Conflict of Interest Board, a director of the Fund for Modern Courts, and a director of the East Harlem Tutorial Program.

== Death ==
Sheldon Oliensis died of cancer at his home in Manhattan on May 14, 2001. He was 79 years old.

== Sources ==
- Morris, Jeffrey B. "Making Sure We are True to Our Founders": The Association of the Bar of the City of New York, 1980-1995. New York, NY: Fordham University Press, 1997. ISBN 0-8232-1738-8
- “Sheldon Oliensis, Former Bar Association Head; 79.” The New York Times. May 15, 2001.
