= House of the New York City Bar Association =

Clubhouse in Manhattan, New York

- Association of the Bar of the City of New York
- U.S. National Register of Historic Places
- New York State Register of Historic Places
- New York City Landmark
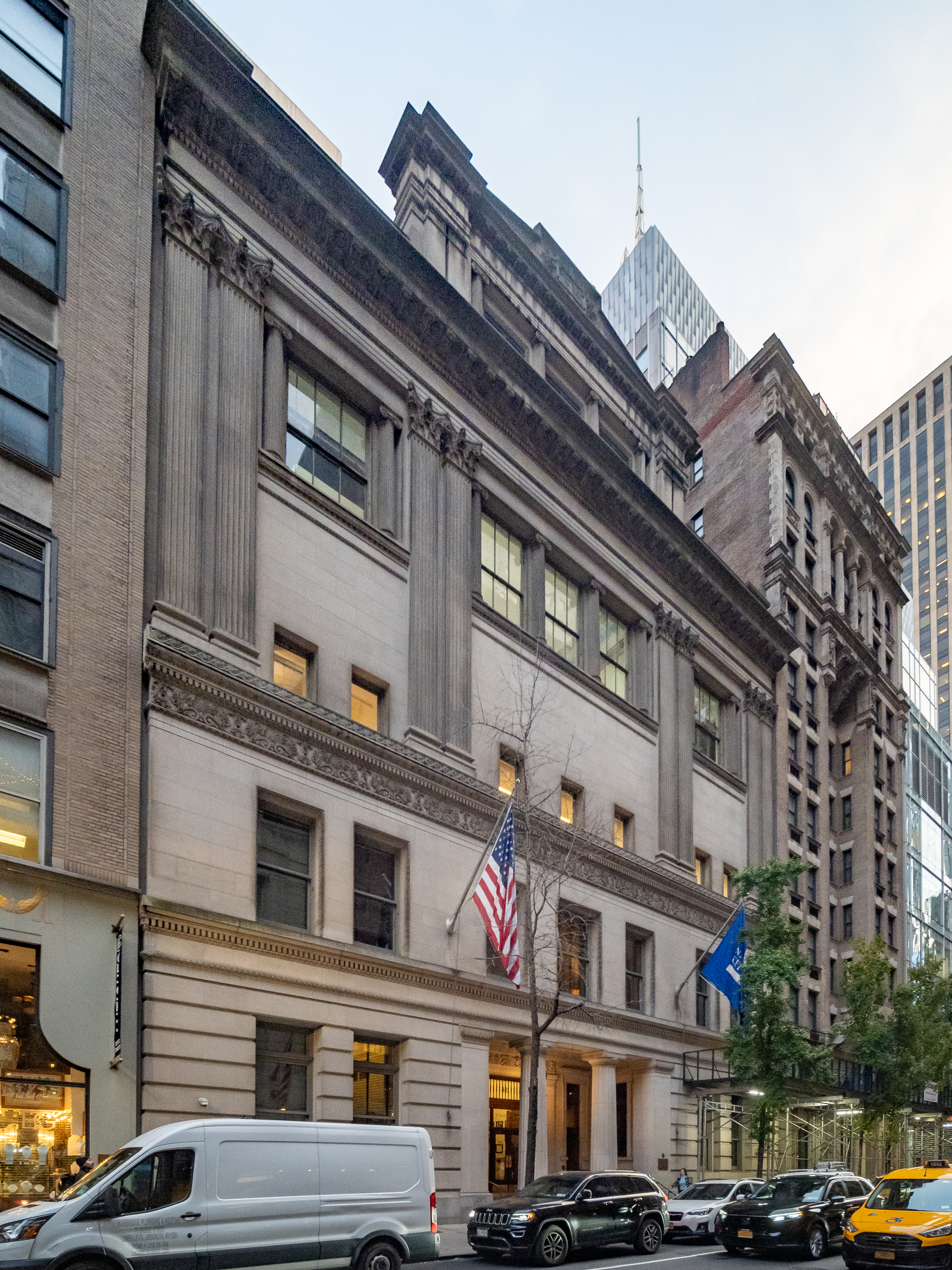
- 44th Street facade (2024)
- Location: 42 West 44th Street, New York City, U.S.
- Coordinates: 40°45′20″N 73°58′56″W
- Built: 1896
- Architect: Cyrus L. W. Eidlitz
- Architectural style: Neoclassical
- NRHP reference No.: 80002666
- NYSRHP No.: 06101.000405
- NYCL No.: 0256

Significant dates
- Added to NRHP: January 3, 1980
- Designated NYSRHP: June 23, 1980
- Designated NYCL: June 7, 1966

The House of the New York City Bar Association, located at 42 West 44th Street in Manhattan, New York, is a New York City Landmark building that has housed the New York City Bar Association since its construction in 1896.

== History ==
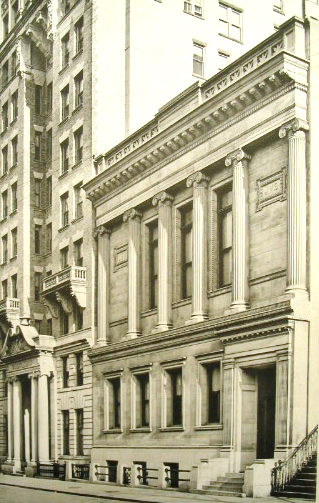
43rd Street Entrance of the New York City Bar Association Building, c. 1900

After the New York City Bar Association was founded in 1870, it housed itself in a series of buildings in Lower Manhattan. By the 1890s, membership of the Association had grown to the point where its leadership began looking for a new House farther uptown. On December 11, 1894 the membership approved the acquisition of a large site between West 43rd and West 44th Streets for the construction of a new, larger building. The street, already home to the Harvard Club of New York City and the Century Association, was considered by the members “specially adapted to our purposes” because of the other prominent clubs and societies in its vicinity.

The architect Cyrus L.W. Eidlitz, son New York City architect Leopold Eidlitz, was commissioned to design the building. Eidlitz had designed a number of landmark buildings throughout the country, including Dearborn Station in Chicago, Buffalo & Erie County Public Library, St. Peter's Church in the Bronx, and Bell Laboratories Building in Manhattan.

Construction was begun in early 1895 and completed 18 months later at a total cost of $584,700. The House was built in the neoclassical style, from Indiana limestone. The façade included elements of the Doric order on the bottom three floors, Ionic columns framing the fourth floor windows, and Corinthian pilasters on the fifth floor, creating a historicist “composite” of classical architecture.

The new House was considerably larger and grander than its precursors: it stood six stories tall; included a meeting hall with a seating capacity of 1,500; a reception hall with a standing capacity of 1,500; a library of over 50,000 volumes, and three additional floors of offices. The entrance hall and first floor stairways were constructed of marble, and the second floor hallway, reception hall, and meeting hall of granite, marble, and mahogany.

The Association opened the doors of its new House on October 8, 1896, with a gala of several thousand guests. The New York Times described it as “one of the most interesting and successful works of recent architecture…a work having the classical qualities of simplicity, purity, and serenity in a high degree.”

The House was named a New York City Landmark in 1966, and named to the National Register of Historic Places in 1980.

== Gallery ==
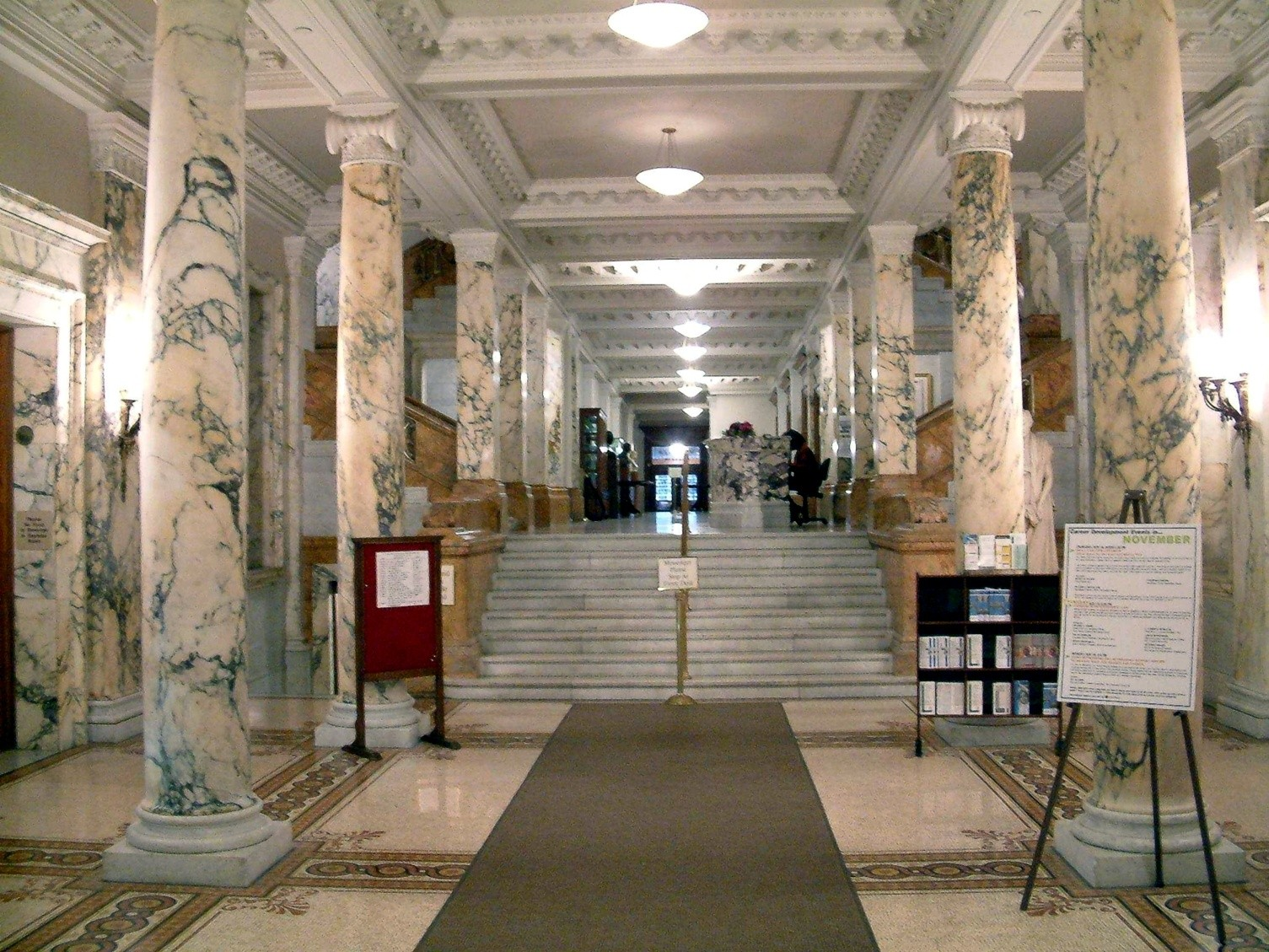
The entrance hall of the New York City Bar Association, 2010.

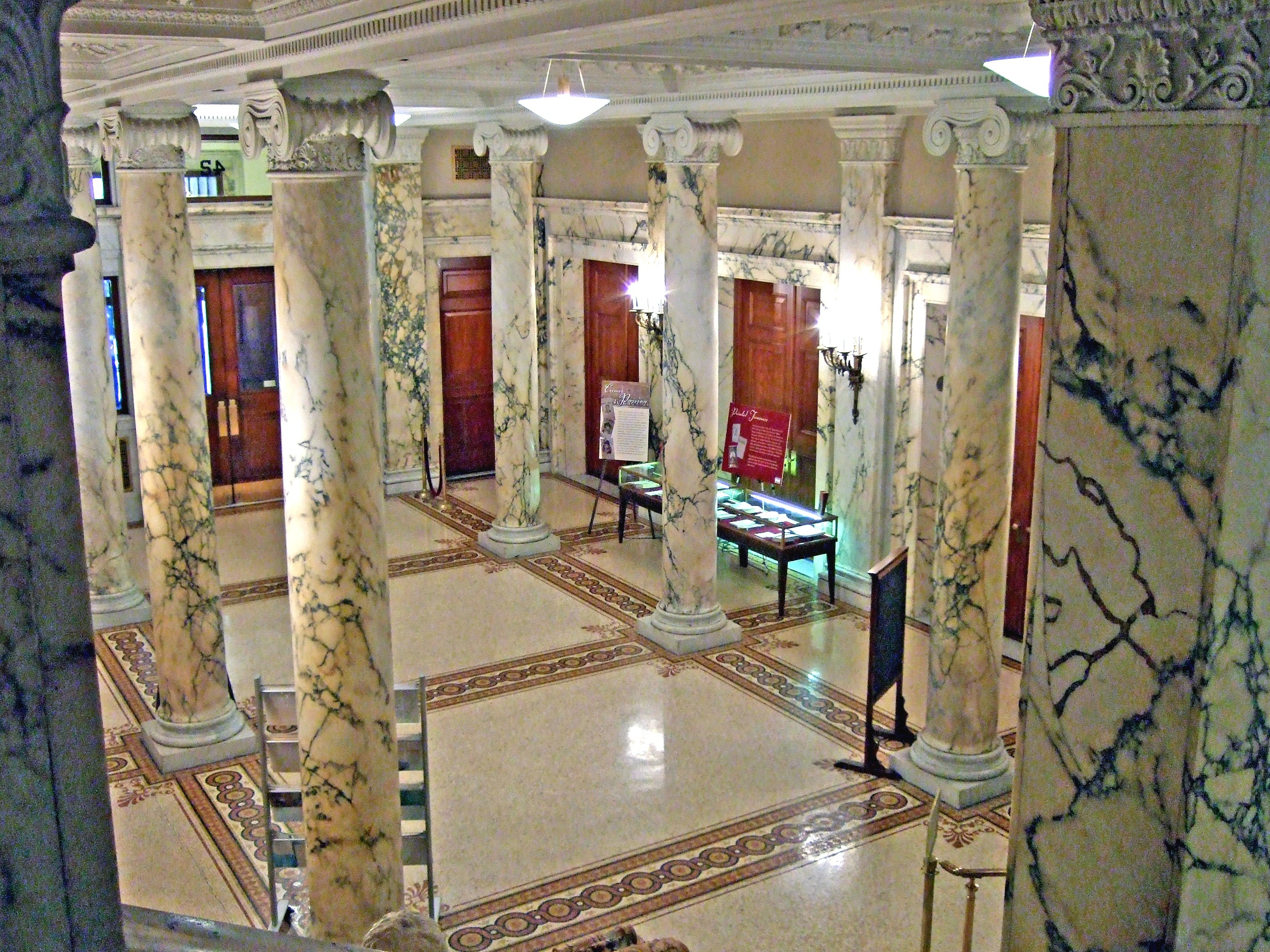
The entrance hall preserves the marble Ionic columns and tile mosaic floors of the original, 1896 Eidlitz design.

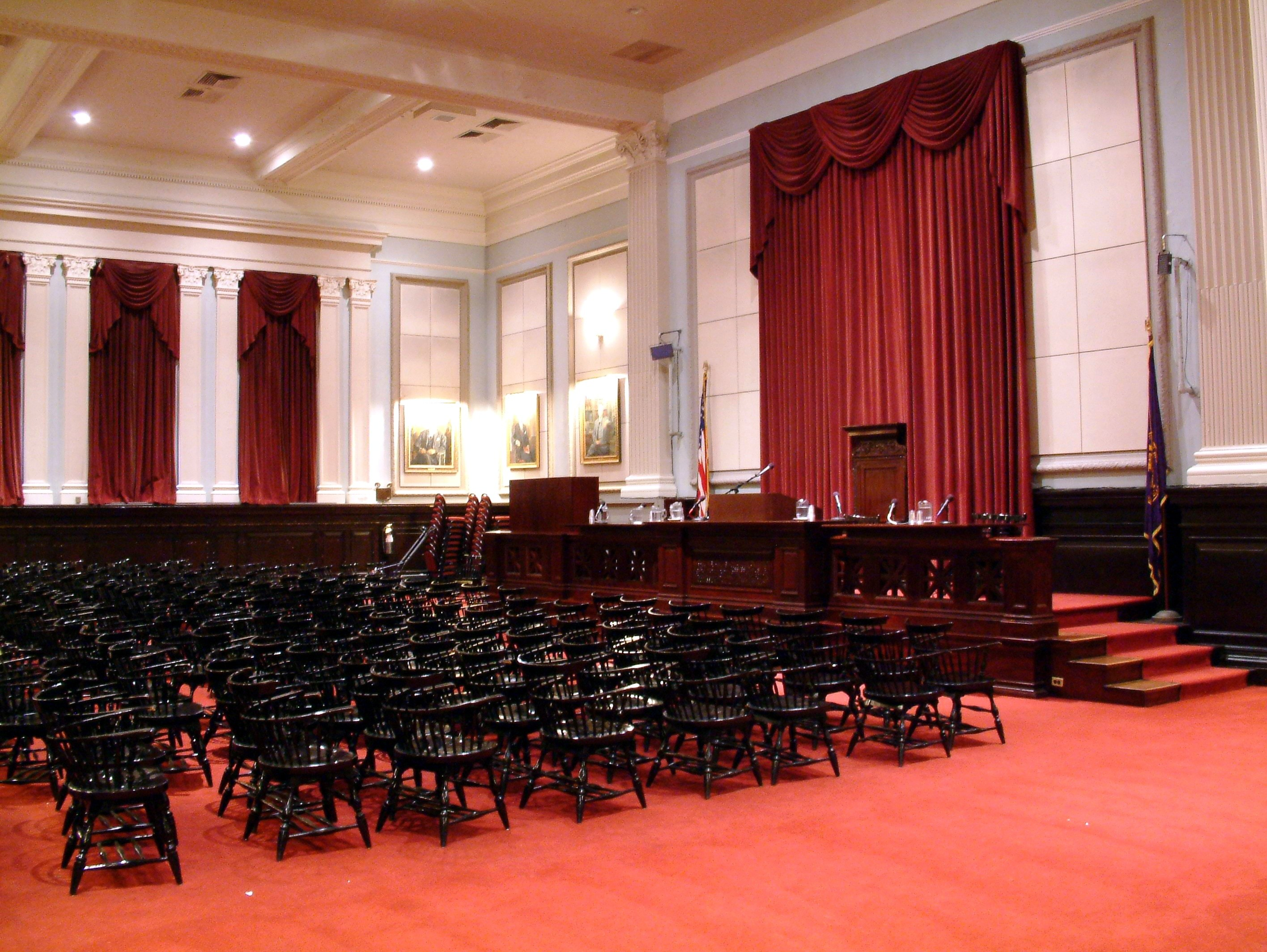
The meeting hall of the New York City Bar Association, 2010.

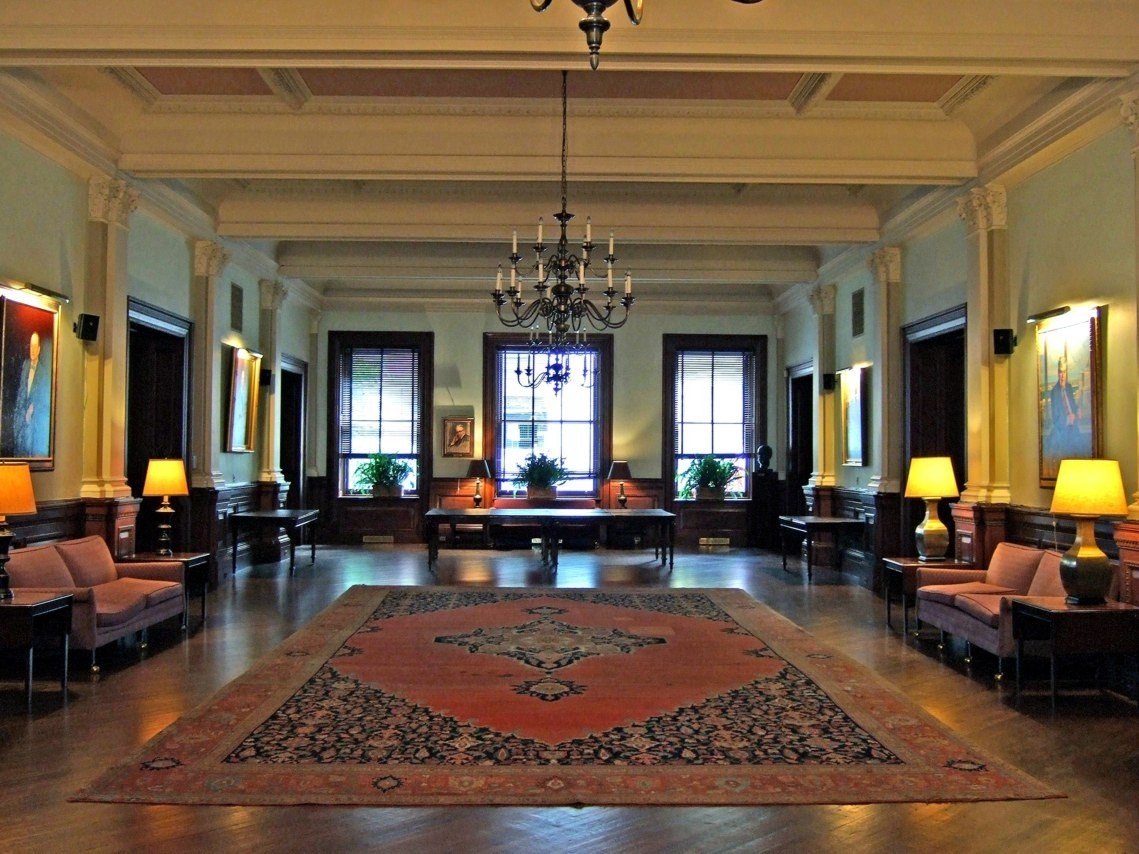
The reception hall of the New York City Bar Association, 2010.

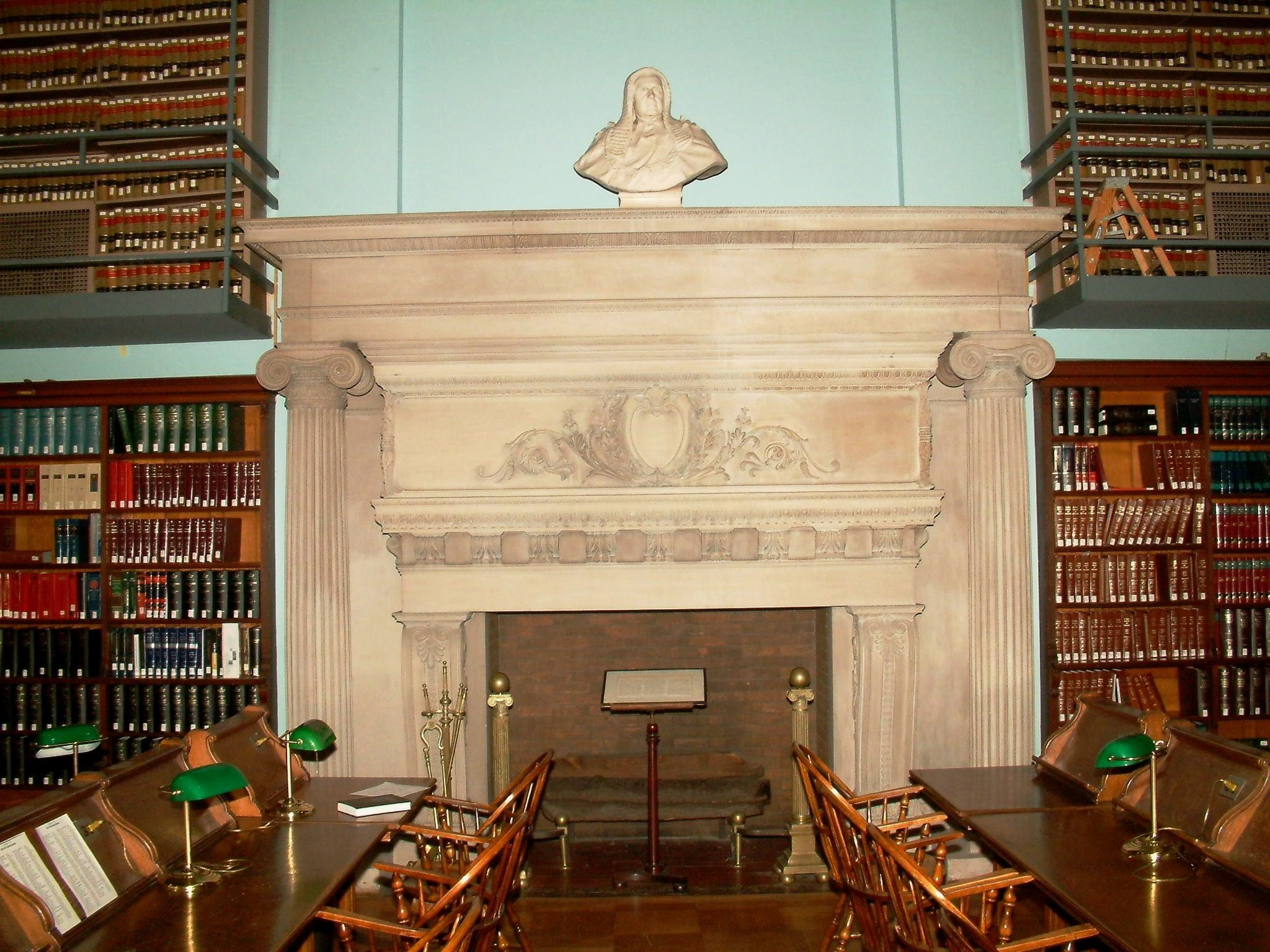
A bust of Lord Russell of Killowen, executed by Thomas Brock in 1901. The bust was given to the Association in 1903, and now sits above a granite fireplace in the Association's library.

== See also ==
- Architecture of New York City
- List of New York City Designated Landmarks in Manhattan from 14th to 59th Streets
- National Register of Historic Places listings in New York County, New York
