= American College of Trial Lawyers =

American-Canadian professional association of trial lawyers

The American College of Trial Lawyers (ACTL) is a professional association of trial lawyers from the United States and Canada. Founded in 1950, the College is dedicated to maintaining and improving the standards of trial practice, especially trial advocacy, the administration of justice and the ethics of the profession. Through its Board of Regents, its general committees, and its state and province committees, the College engages in a wide variety of activities to further those purposes. The College also awards the Medal for Excellence in Advocacy on a yearly basis, as well as the awards are presented at various events or competitions judged by members of the College.

== Foundation ==
The Foundation of the American College of Trial Lawyers (ACTL Foundation), established in 1965, and the Canadian Foundation of the American College of Trial Lawyers, established in 2010, are non-profit organizations founded to advance the initiatives and objectives of the College. The Foundation strives to improve the standards of trial and appellate advocacy, the ethics of the profession, and the administration of justice.

== Publications ==
The College publishes the Codes of Conduct, papers, reports, and other items that contribute to the administration of justice and the profession. Reports may range from brief analyses of proposed amendments to the federal rules to a book-length manual on complex tort litigation.

The College publishes a series of lectures from distinguished speakers who presented at previous meetings of the College in honor of Lewis F. Powell, Jr., the twentieth President of the College and the ninety-ninth Justice to sit on the Supreme Court of the United States.
