= Seong Sil Kim v. New York City Transit Authority =

2000 lawsuit

- Court: New York Supreme Court, Appellate Division
- Full case name: Seong Sil Kim et al., Respondents, v. New York City Transit Authority, Appellant.
- Decided: March 23, 2006
- Citations: 27 A.D. 3d 332; 812 N.Y.S.2d 485

Court membership
- Judges sitting: David Friedman, Eugene L. Nardelli, Milton L. Williams, Luis A. Gonzalez, John Sweeny

Case opinions
- Concurrence: Friedman, Nardelli, Williams, Sweeny
- Dissent: Gonzales

Seong Sil Kim v. New York City Transit Authority is a lawsuit in which a woman who laid down on subway tracks in 2000 in an apparent suicide attempt was first awarded over US$14,000,000 after a train hit her. The New York City Transit Authority appealed, and in 2006 the New York Supreme Court Appellate Division, First Department overturned the jury verdict and dismissed the case.

== Context ==
On May 3, 2000, Seong Sil Kim lay down on the subway tracks just north of 34th Street on the West Side of Manhattan. Soon thereafter she was hit by an E train and was nearly killed. She suffered traumatic amputation of the right hand except for the thumb; multiple skull and facial bone fractures; fractures to the right radius; fractured left toes; and lacerations of the face, abdomen, and leg, resulting in permanent scarring. Kim then sued the New York City Transit Authority for negligence and substantial damages.

== Lawsuit ==
In the subsequent trial, it was revealed that a passenger called '9-1-1' about six minutes before the accident, saying that he had seen a person lying on the tracks. Train operators were notified immediately, and the driver of the E train was moving between 10 and 15 miles per hour (16 and 24 km/h) when he saw Kim and tried to stop the train before reaching her. That was an appropriate speed for the New York City Subway "caution" alert under which his train was operating. However, Kim's lawyers presented an expert witness who calculated that the operator should have been able to stop his train in time had he been going 10 miles per hour (16 km/h) or less, under an "extreme caution" alert.

Through a translator, Kim claimed to have no memory of how she ended up on the tracks. However, she was 30 to 100 feet (10 to 30 m) north of the platform, so she could not have fallen there. She lay on the tracks in the tunnel for at least 24 minutes before her encounter with the train. Kim had given birth two months before the event, and the city submitted evidence that she was suffering from postpartum depression.

Kim initially won her lawsuit, and a sympathetic jury awarded her $14.1 million. However, the judge reduced the amount because the jury apportioned Kim with 30% responsibility for her own injury, leaving her with $9.9 million. Her lawyer, David Dean, of the law firm of Sullivan Papain Block McGrath & Cannavo, said, "How she got there was less important than the obligations of the operator. You still have an obligation to operate a train safely, and this guy just didn't."

Following a post-trial motion, the damage award was further reduced to $5 million. Finally in 2006, a panel of appellate judges ruled 4–1 that there was legally insufficient evidence to support a finding of Transit Authority negligence or to establish which of several possible trains caused Kim's injuries. The trial judge was reversed, the jury verdict vacated, and the complaint dismissed.
