= List of first minority male lawyers and judges in New York =

This is a list of the first minority male lawyer(s) and judge(s) in New York. It includes the year in which the men were admitted to practice law (in parentheses). Also included are other distinctions such as the first minority men in their state to graduate from law school or become a political figure.

== Firsts in state history ==
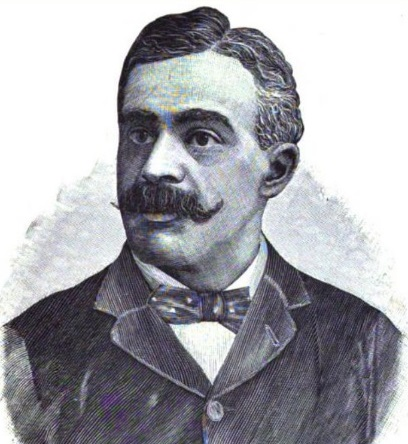
James Campbell Matthews: First African American male law graduate in New York (1870)

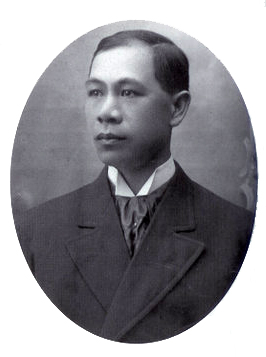
Hong Yen Chang: First male lawyer of Chinese descent in New York (1888)

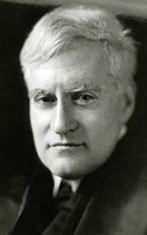
Benjamin N. Cardozo: First Jewish male Judge of the New York Court of Appeals (1914)

=== Law School ===
- James Campbell Matthews (1870): First African American male to graduate from law school in New York (1870)

=== Lawyers ===
- Sampson Simson (1800): First Jewish American male lawyer in New York
- Moses Simons (1816) and George Boyer Vashon (1847): First African American male lawyers in New York
- Eneas Yamada (1877): First Asian male (who was of Japanese descent) lawyer admitted to the New York State Bar before the examination requirement
- John F. Charles: First African American male lawyer admitted to practice before the Supreme Court of New York (1880)
- Hong Yen Chang (1888): First Asian male lawyer (who was a Chinese immigrant) in New York
- Huan Chuen Mei (1915): First Chinese American male admitted to practice before the federal courts of New York
- George E. Phillies: First Greek American male lawyer to argue a case before the New York Court of Appeals (1918)
- F.J. Hans: First blind male lawyer in New York
- Thomas H. Lee (1936): First Chinese American lawyer admitted to the New York State Bar
- George Yamaoka (1939): First Japanese American male lawyer in New York
- Antonio C. Martinez (1956): First Dominican American male lawyer in New York
- Harris L. Kimball: First openly LGBT male lawyer in New York (1973)
- E. Carrington Boggan: First openly LGBT male lawyer to argue a case before the New York Court of Appeal (1973)
- Khagendra Gharti-Chhetry (1987): First Nepali American male lawyer in New York
- Gao Xiqing (1988): First Chinese citizen (male) to pass the New York State Bar Exam
- Weerawong Chittmittrapap (1992): First Thai (male) lawyer admitted to the New York State Bar Association
- Cesar Vargas (2015): First undocumented male admitted to practice law in New York
- Umair Khan: First Pakistani American male lawyer to work for the New York State Senate's legal department (2020)
- Ely S. Parker: First Native American male posthumously admitted to the New York State Bar Association (2025)

=== State judges ===
- James Campbell Matthews (1870): First African American male judge in New York (1895)
- John Palmieri: First Italy-born male judge in New York (1904)
- Gasper Liota: First Italian American judge in New York (1924)
- James S. Watson and Charles E. Toney: First African American males elected respectively as judges in New York (1930)
- Emilio Nunez (1929): First Hispanic American male judge in New York (1951)
- Robert J. Mangum (1949): First African American male appointed as a Judge of the New York State Court of Claims (1967)
- Gilbert Ramirez: First (Puerto Rican) blind male judge in New York (1968)
- Randall T. Eng (1973): First Asian American male (Chinese American) judge in New York (1983)
- William Thom: First openly LGBT male judge in New York (1984)
- Danny K. Chun (1987): First Korean American male judge in New York
- Ned B. Bertulfo: First Filipino American male to serve as a state administrative law judge in New York
- Mark A. Montour (1983): First Native American male state judge in New York (2013)
- Joseph Zayas: First Latino American male to serve as the chief administrative judge in New York (2023)
- Seth Marnin: First openly LGBT male judge in New York (2023)
- Vikram Vilkhu: First Indian American criminal judge in New York (2024)

==== Supreme Court ====
- Albert Cardozo: First Jewish American male to serve as a Justice of the Supreme Court of New York (1867)
- Salvatore A. Cotillo (1912): First Italian American male appointed as a Justice of the Supreme Court of New York (1924)
- Gilberto "Gilbert" Ramirez (c. 1957): First blind and Puerto Rican male appointed as a Justice of the Supreme Court of New York (1975); Gilbert Ramirez Park in Brooklyn is named in his honor.
- Marquette Floyd: First African American male appointed as a Justice of the New York State Supreme Court
- Oliver D. Williams: First African American male appointed as a Justice of the New York State Supreme Court from the Second Judicial Conference (1963)
- Samuel L. Green: First African American male (outside of New York City) elected to the New York State Supreme Court, Eighth Judicial District (1978)
- Richard Failla: First openly LGBT male to be elected as a Justice of the New York State Supreme Court (1989)

==== Supreme Court, Appellate Division ====
- John Carro (1956): First Puerto Rican male appointed as a Justice of the New York State Supreme Court, Appellate Division (1979)
- William “Willie” Thompson: First African American male to serve on the Supreme Court, Appellate Division, Second Department
- Samuel L. Green: First African American male to serve on the Supreme Court, Appellate Division, Fourth Department (1983)
- Peter Tom (1975): First Asian American male appointed to the New York State Supreme Court, Appellate Division (1994)
- Luis A. Gonzalez: First Puerto Rican male to serve as the Presiding Justice of the Appellate Division of the Supreme Court, First Judicial Department in New York (2009)
- Anil Singh: First South Asian American male to serve as a Justice of the Appellate Division of the Supreme Court, First Judicial Department in New York (2017)

==== Court of Appeals ====
- Charles A. Rapallo: First Italian American male to serve on the New York Court of Appeals (1870)
- Benjamin N. Cardozo (1891): First Jewish male to serve on the New York Court of Appeals (1914)
- Matthew J. Jasen: First Polish American male to serve on the New York Court of Appeals (1967)
- Harold A. Stevens (1938): First African American male appointed as a Judge of the New York Court of Appeals (1974)
- Fritz W. Alexander, II (1951): First African American male to serve as an Associate Judge of the New York Court of Appeals (1985)
- Paul Feinman (1985): First openly LGBT male appointed as a Judge of the New York Court of Appeals (2017)
- Rowan D. Wilson: First African American male to serve as the Chief Judge of the New York Court of Appeals (2023)

=== Federal judges ===
- Matthew T. Abruzzo: First Italian American male to serve as a federal judge in New York (upon his appointment to the United States District Court for the Eastern District of New York in 1936)
- Henry Bramwell: First African American male appointed as a Judge of the U.S. District Court for the Eastern District of New York (1974)
- Richard C. Casey (1958): First blind male appointed as a Judge of the U.S. District Court for the Southern District of New York (1997)
- Randolph Treece: First African American male to serve as a Judge of the U.S. District Court for the Northern District of New York (2001)
- Raymond Lohier (1991): First Haitian American male to be appointed as a Judge of the U.S. Court of Appeals for the Second Circuit in New York (2010)
- Arun Subramanian: First Indian American male to serve as a Judge of the United States District Court for the Southern District of New York (2023)
- Sanket J. Bulsara: First South Asian male to serve as a Judge of the U.S. District Court for the Eastern District of New York (2024)

=== Attorney General ===
- Simon W. Rosendale: First Jewish American male elected as the Attorney General of New York (1891)
- Anthony J. DiGiovanna: First Italian American male to launch a campaign to become the Attorney General of New York

=== Special Deputy Attorney General ===
- Cornelius W. McDougal: First African American to serve as the Special Deputy Attorney General of New York (1926)

=== United States Attorney ===
- Benito Romano: First Puerto Rican male to serve as the Interim United States Attorney for the Southern District of New York (1989)
- Preet Bharara: First Asian American male (Indian) to serve as a U.S. Attorney for the Southern District of New York (2009)
- Richard S. Hartunian: First Armenian American male to serve as a U.S. Attorney in New York (upon becoming the United States Attorney for the Northern District of New York in 2010)
- Damian Williams: First African American male to serve as the United States Attorney for the Southern District of New York (2021)

=== Assistant United States Attorney ===
- Thomas H. Lee: First Asian American male to serve as an Assistant U.S. Attorney in New York (1951)

=== District Attorneys ===
- Robert T. Johnson: First African American male elected to serve as District Attorney in New York (1989)
- Eric Gonzalez: First Latino American male elected to serve as District Attorney in New York (2017)

=== Assistant District Attorney ===
- James Dickson Carr: First African American male to serve as an Assistant District Attorney in New York (1899)
- Edwin Torres: First Puerto Rican male to serve as an Assistant District Attorney in New York (1958)
- Randall T. Eng (1973): First Asian American male (Chinese American) to serve as an Assistant District Attorney in New York

=== Political Office ===
- Richard Harewood: First African American male (a lawyer) elected to a statewide office in New York (upon his election multiple times to the House of Representatives)
- Gilberto "Gilbert" Ramirez (c. 1957): First blind and Puerto Rican male (a lawyer) elected to the New York State Assembly (1965)
- Herman Badillo: First Puerto Rican male (a lawyer) elected as a member of the U.S. House of Representatives from New York (1971)
- Sean Patrick Maloney (1992): First openly LGBT male (a lawyer) elected to Congress from New York (2013)

=== Bar Associations ===
- Simon W. Rosendale: First Jewish male to serve as the President of the New York State Bar Association
- Archibald R. Murray: First African American male to serve as President of the New York State Bar Association
- Glenn Lau-Kee: First Asian American male to serve as the President of the New York State Bar Association (2014)
- Stephen Lessard: First openly LGBT male to serve as the president of a major bar association in New York [upon becoming the President of the New York County Lawyers Association (NYCLA) in 2019]

=== Faculty ===
- W. Haywood Burns: First African American male to serve as the dean of a New York law school (upon becoming the Dean of City University of New York Law School in 1987)

== Firsts in local history ==
Alphabetized by county name

=== Regions ===
- Antonio Delgado (c. 2005): First African American / Hispanic male (a lawyer) to be elected to Congress from Upstate New York (2019)
- Raul Figueroa: First Hispanic American (male) elected as a judge outside of New York City (1984)
- Richard Rivera: First Latino American male judge to serve in the Third Judicial District in New York State (2015)
- Kris Singh: First South Asian American male elected as a judge in Upstate New York (2022; Montgomery County's Surrogate Court)

==== New York City (in general) ====
- James D. Carr: First African American male to serve as the Assistant District Attorney in New York City (1898)
- Myles Paige (1925): First African American male to serve as a Judge of the New York City Magistrate’s Court (1936)
- Thomas H. Lee: First Asian American male licensed to practice law in New York City (1936)
- Emilio Nunez (1927): First Latino American male judge in New York City (1952–1956)
- Walter H. Gladwin (1941): First African American to become a New York City Criminal Court Judge and an Assistant District Attorney in the Bronx
- Francis E. Rivers: First African American male judge on the City Court of New York (1943)
- Randall T. Eng (1973): First Asian American male (Chinese American) appointed as a Judge of the New York City Criminal Court (1983) and Presiding Justice of the Appellate Division, Second Department (2012)
- Richard Failla: First openly LGBT male to become a Judge of the New York City Criminal Court (1985)
- Arnold Lim: First Asian American male appointed as a Judge of the Family Court in New York City (2000)
- Conrad K. Harper: First African American male to serve as the President of the New York City Bar Association (1990–1992)
- Alexander Jeong: First Asian American male appointed as a Deputy Administrative Judge of the New York City Criminal Courts (2014)
- Roger Juan Maldonado: First Latino American male to serve as the President of the New York City Bar Association (2018)
- Edwin I. Novillo: First Ecuadorian American male appointed as a judge by the Mayor of New York City (2018)
- Muhammad U. Faridi: First Muslim American male to serve as the President of the New York City Bar Association (2024)

=== Albany County ===
- John Baker: First African American male to serve as the Dean of Albany Law School (1991)
- William Carter: First African American male to serve as a Judge of the Albany City Court (2002)
- David Soares: First African American male to serve as the District Attorney of Albany County, New York (2004)
- Richard Rivera: First Latino American male judge in Albany County, New York (2015)

=== Bronx County (New York City) ===
- Harold A. Stevens (1938): First African American male to serve as a Supreme Court Justice, First Judicial District (New York and Bronx Counties, 1955)
- Robert T. Johnson: First African American male elected to serve as District Attorney of Bronx County, New York (1989)

=== Dutchess County ===
- Gaius Charles Bolin Sr.: First African American male lawyer in Dutchess County, New York. He was also the first Black (male) President of the Dutchess County Bar Association.
- William Sanchez: First Hispanic American male elected as a judge in Dutchess County, New York

=== Erie County ===
- Raul Figueroa: First Hispanic American lawyer to work for Buffalo, New York. He later became the first Hispanic American (male) elected as a Judge of the Buffalo City Court in 1984. [Erie County, New York]
- David Edmunds, Jr.: First minority male (who is of African descent) to serve as the President of the Erie County Bar Association (2001)

=== Kings County (New York City) ===
- Francis "Frank" L. Corrao (1891): First Italian American male lawyer in Brooklyn, Kings County, New York
- Rufus L. Perry: First African American male to serve as the Assistant District Attorney in Kings County, New York (1895)
- Lewis S. Flagg, Jr.: First African American male elected as a judge in Brooklyn, New York (1953)
- William “Willie” Thompson: First African American male to serve as an administrative judge in Kings County, New York
- Richard Rivera: First Puerto Rican male elected as the Civil Court Judge in Kings County, New York (1990)
- Eric Gonzalez: First Latino American male elected to serve as District Attorney for Brooklyn, Kings County, New York State (2017)
- Manuel A. Romero: First Latino American male to serve as the President of the Brooklyn Bar Association, New York (2004)

=== Monroe County ===
- John A. Cooke (1948): First African American male lawyer in Rochester, Monroe County, New York
- T. Andrew Brown: First minority male to serve as the President of the Monroe County Bar Association, New York
- Vikram Vilkhu: First Indian American male to serve as a criminal judge in Brighton, Monroe County, New York (2024)

=== Nassau County ===
- Moxey Rigby (1925): First African American male judge in Nassau County, New York (1959)
- Aaron Twerski: First Hasidic Jewish male to serve as the Dean of Hofstra University School of Law (1977)
- Lance D. Clarke: First African American male to serve as the President of the Nassau County Bar Association (2007)
- Alfred Robbins (1957): First African American judge from Long Island to become President of the Board of Judges in the District Court (1974). He later became the first African American male appointed as the Supervising Judge of the Court, as well as the first African American elected to the Supreme Court on Long Island, Tenth Judicial District.

=== New York County (New York City) ===
- James Dickson Carr: First African American male to serve as an Assistant District Attorney for New York County, New York (1899)
- John D. Stephanidis (1913): First Greek lawyer in New York County, New York
- Harold A. Stevens (1938): First African American male to serve as a Supreme Court Justice, First Judicial District (New York and Bronx Counties, 1955)
- Edwin Torres: First Puerto Rican male to serve as the Assistant District Attorney in New York County (1958)
- Danny K. Chun (1987): First Korean American male appointed as the Assistant District Attorney in Manhattan [New York County, New York]
- Joungwon Kim: First Korean American lawyer to join a Wall Street firm [New York County, New York]
- Michael Tecklenburg: First deaf male (who is also African American) to graduate from Columbia Law School (1989; New York County, New York)
- Peter Tom (1975): First Asian American male elected to the New York State Supreme Court in New York County (1990)
- Jonathan Berger: First deaf male lawyer to work for Manhattan District Attorney's Office (1998)
- Jeffrey K. Oing: First Asian American male to serve as a Judge of the New York State Supreme Court in New York County, Commercial Division (2011)
- Alvin Bragg: First African American male to serve as the District Attorney of New York County (2022)

=== Onondaga County ===
- Langston McKinney: First African American male to serve as the Judge of the Syracuse City Court (1986) [Onondaga County, New York]
- Gordon Cuffy: First African American male to serve as the County Attorney (2008) and a judge in Onondaga County, New York (2017)

=== Orange County ===
- Jaime Santana: First Hispanic American male judge in Orange County, New York (2010)

=== Queens County (New York City) ===
- William Tucker Gavin: First African American male to serve as an Assistant District Attorney in Queens
- Kenneth Browne Hollis: First African American male to serve as a Justice of the Queens Supreme Court (1973)
- Randall T. Eng (1973): First Asian American male (Chinese American) appointed as a Justice of the New York State Supreme Court, Queens County (1991) and Administrative Judge of the Criminal Term, Queens County Supreme Court (2007)
- Jaime Rios: First Hispanic American male elected as a Judge of the Civil Court in Queens County, New York (1994)
- Richard M. Gutierrez: First Latino American male to serve as the President of the Queens County Bar Association, New York (c. 2011)
- Jose Rey: First Hispanic American male lawyer in Jackson Heights, Queens County, New York

=== Rensselaer County ===
- Samuel W. Gibson: First African American male lawyer in Rensselaer County, New York

=== Richmond County (New York City) ===
- Raymond Rodriguez: First Hispanic American male judge in Staten Island (Richmond County, New York; 2013)
- Ronald Castorina: First openly LGBT male from the Republican Party to serve as a judge in Staten Island (2017)

=== Suffolk County ===
- Marquette Floyd: First African American male judge in Suffolk County, New York (1969)

=== Tompkins County ===
- Eduardo Peñalver: First Latino American male to serve as the Dean of Cornell Law School (2014) [Tompkins County, New York]

=== Ulster County ===
- Emmanuel "Manny" Nneji: First African American male to serve as the District Attorney for Ulster County, New York (2023)

=== Westchester County ===
- Antonio Joseph Marino: First Italian American male lawyer in Rye, Westchester County, New York
- Thomas Quinones: First Hispanic American male to serve as a municipal court judge in Yonkers, New York (2016) [Westchester County, New York]

== See also ==
- List of first minority male lawyers and judges in the United States

== Other topics of interest ==
- List of first women lawyers and judges in the United States
- List of first women lawyers and judges in New York
