= David Leventritt =

Lawyer and judge in New York (1845–1926)

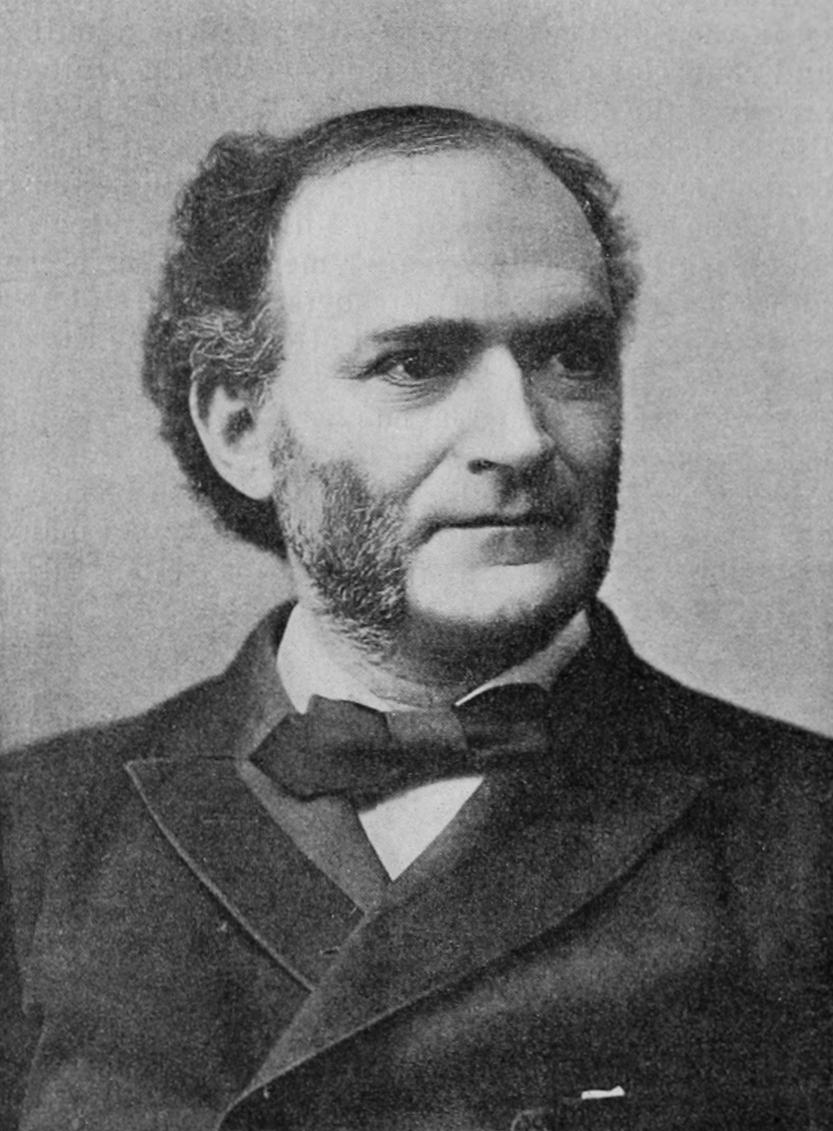

Justice of the New York Supreme Court
- In office 1899–1908

Personal details
- Born: January 31, 1845; Winnsboro, South Carolina
- Died: January 9, 1926 (aged 80); New York, New York
- Resting place: Salem Fields Cemetery
- Political party: Democratic
- Spouse: Matilda Lithauer (m. 1868)
- Children: 3
- Education: College of the City of New York; New York University School of Law
- Occupation: Jurist
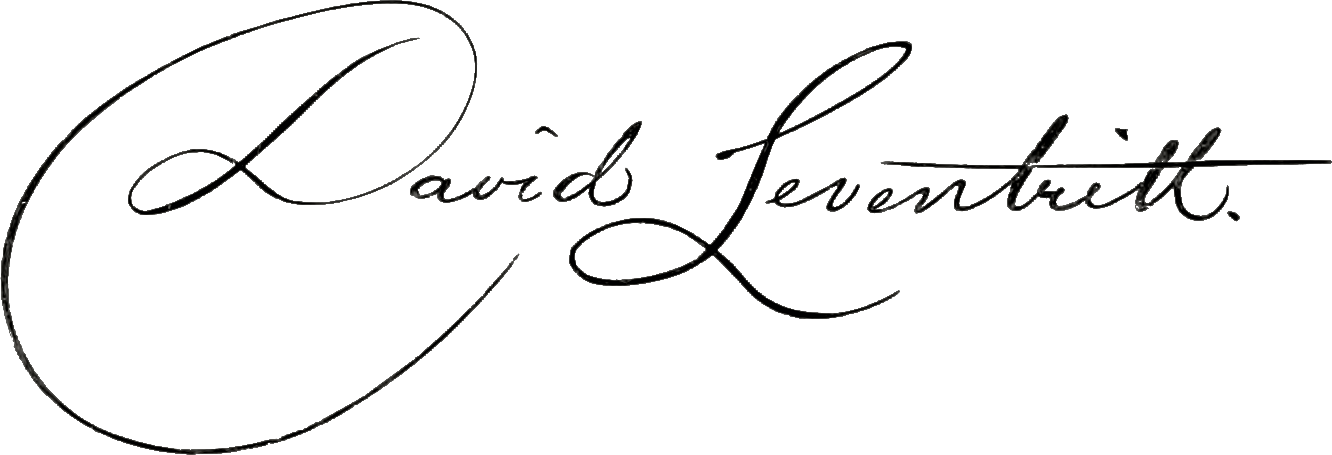
- Signature

David Leventritt (January 31, 1845 – January 9, 1926) was a Jewish-American lawyer and judge from New York.

== Life ==
Leventritt was born on January 31, 1845, in Winnsboro, South Carolina, the son of George M. Leventritt and Betty Goldberg. His parents were German immigrants, with his father immigrating to America in 1834.

Leventritt moved with his parents to New York City, New York, in 1854. He attended public schools there. He graduated from the Free Academy (later known as the College of the City of New York) in 1864 with the second honors of the class and an A.B. degree. He then studied law, graduating from the New York University School of Law with an LL.B. in 1870. He was president of a commission appointed to investigate the Third Avenue Bridge over the Harlem River and counsel for the Theatrical Syndicate. He was involved in a number of notable court cases, including one for New York City in reference to the condemnation of lands for park purposes between Harlem and Washington Bridge; the property owners claimed 1.5 million dollars in damages, but through his efforts they were awarded less than half that amount. The land became Washington Park. He was also involved in the settlement of the will of railroad builder Henry B. Plant.

Leventritt was a Democrat and a follower of Tammany Hall. In 1898, he was a Democratic candidate for the New York Supreme Court. The campaign was somewhat embittered, although he won the election and ran ahead of his ticket. He joined the Court in 1899 and was immediately designated as a justice of the Appellate Term, a distinction no judge received on their first year of service until then. During the 1898 election, the New York City Bar Association condemned his candidacy. Due to the efforts of Secretary of War (and former Association president) Elihu Root, the Association unanimously adopted a resolution to remove the censure in 1906.

Leventritt resigned as Justice of the Supreme Court in 1908 and became head of the new law firm Leventritt, Cook & Nathan. He formed the law firm with Alfred A. Cook, Harold Nathan, his nephew Edgar M. Leventritt, and Emil Goldmark. 500 lawyers and judges from the New York County Lawyers' Association held a dinner at the Hotel Astor later that year in honor of his judicial service, with ex-Justice William J. Wallace presiding, ex-Justice Morgan J. O'Brien serving as toastmaster, and speeches from Justice Almet F. Jenks, Justice John Proctor Clarke, Linn Bruce, and Governor Charles Evans Hughes. In 1910, the New York Supreme Court, Appellate Division appointed him chairman of the committee on character and fitness of candidates for admission to the bar. He held that position for twelve years, during which time he passed on the qualifications of 5,840 candidates. He continued participating in important trials and arguments until he became somewhat enfeebled by old age.

Leventritt was associated with a number of Jewish charitable institutions in New York City. He was vice-president and president of the Aguilar Free Library, a trustee and vice-president of Congregation Emanu-El of New York, and a director of the Judaeans. Interested in Jewish education, he helped establish several Hebrew schools. He was a member of the American Legion of Honor, B'nai B'rith, the Montefiore Home for Chronic Invalids, Mount Sinai Hospital, the Hebrew Orphan Asylum, the American International Law Society, the National Geographic Society, and the Educational Alliance. In 1868, he married Matilda Lithauer. Their children were Olivia, Walter R., and Leo L.

Leventritt died in his apartment at the St. Regis New York on January 9, 1926. His funeral at Temple Emanu-El was conducted by Rabbi Nathan Krass, Rabbi Joseph Silverman, and Rabbi Hyman G. Enelow. The honorary pallbearers included John G. Agar, Benjamin N. Cardozo, John Proctor Clarke, Lewis L. Delafield, Daniel Frohman, Murry Guggenheim, William D. Guthrie, Lee Kohns, Louis Marshall, Harold Nathan, Adolph S. Ochs, Samuel H. Ordway, Wilson M. Powell, Elihu Root Jr., Charles Strauss, Henry M. Toch, and Henry J. Bernheim. A number of prominent people in the legal profession and public life were also at the funeral, including Abram I. Elkus, former Judge M. Warley Platzek, Judge William P. Burr, Judge John V. Mcavoy, Judge Francis W. Martin, Alfred A. Cook, Edgar M. Souza, Mortimer Brenner, Charles A. Riegelman, former Senator Simon Guggenheim, and Mitchell L. Erlanger. Some Magistrates adjourned court in order to attend the funeral. He was buried in Salem Fields Cemetery.
