= John R. Brady =

American lawyer (1822–1891)

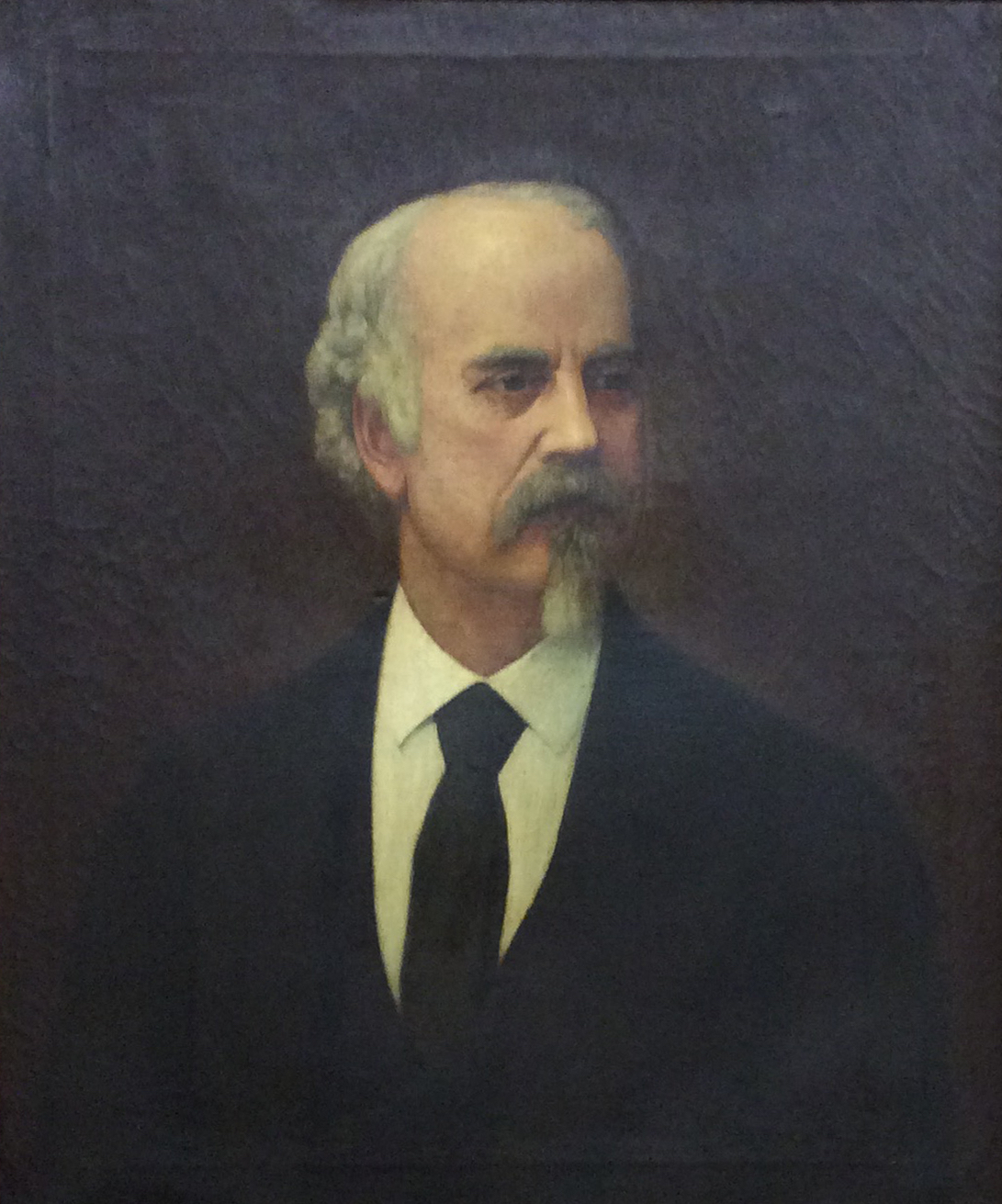
- Brady circa 1890. The Lambs, New York, NY.

Justice of the New York Supreme Court, First District
- In office 1869–1891
- Preceded by: Thomas W. Clerke
- Succeeded by: George Landon Ingraham

Judge of the New York City Court of Common Pleas
- In office 1856–1869
- Preceded by: Lewis Bartholomew Woodruff
- Succeeded by: Charles H. Van Brunt

Shepherd of The Lambs
- In office 1888–1890
- Preceded by: William J. Florence
- Succeeded by: E. M. Holland

Personal details
- Born: March 9, 1822 New York City, New York, U.S.
- Died: March 16, 1891 (aged 69) New York City, New York, U.S.
- Resting place: St. Patrick's Old Cathedral, New York City
- Party: Democratic
- Spouse: Katharine Lydig (m. 1863)
- Children: 4
- Profession: Attorney; Judge

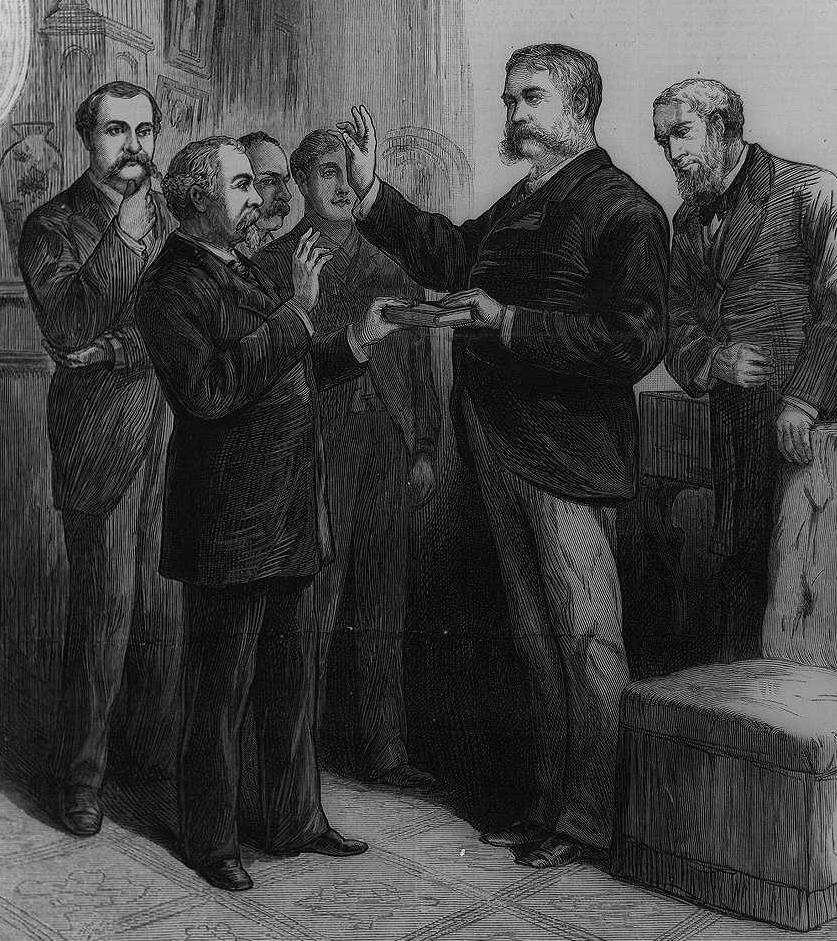
Judge Brady swears in President Arthur in his apartment

John Riker Brady (March 9, 1822 – March 16, 1891) was an American judge, a justice of the New York Supreme Court, and best known for administering the presidential oath of office to Chester A. Arthur.

== Life and career ==
John Riker Brady was born in New York City in March 9, 1822, the son of Thomas S. Brady, an immigrant from Ireland who became an attorney and judge. Brady's brother was James T. Brady, a noted defense attorney. John R. Brady studied law with his father and became an attorney. A Democrat, he served as a Judge of the Court of Common Pleas beginning in 1856, and was a New York Supreme Court Justice from 1869 until his death. A highly regarded jurist, he was frequently reelected with support from both Democrats and Republicans.

From 1888 to 1890, Brady served as president of The Lambs, and was first nontheatrical person to serve as shepherd.

Brady died in New York City on March 16, 1891. He was buried at St. Patrick's Old Cathedral in the Brady family vault.

== Family ==
In 1863, Brady was married to Katharine Lydig. They were the parents of three daughters, Anna Katrina who died July 24, 1865, Mary Madeline (1866-1930) and Katharine Maude (1870-1950), and one son, James T. (died 1884).

== Inauguration of Chester Alan Arthur ==
President James A. Garfield died over two months after he was shot by an assassin, Charles Guiteau. Chester A. Arthur, then vice president, became president.

Arthur was at home around midnight on the night of September 19, 1881, with Police Commissioner Stephen B. French, District Attorney Daniel G. Rollins, and attorney Elihu Root, when he learned in a telegram from members of Garfield's cabinet that Garfield had died. The cabinet members wired Arthur their advice that he should "take the oath of office as president of the United States without delay."

It was after midnight when Arthur and his guests dispatched messengers to locate a judge who could administer the presidential oath. The first jurist who could be located in the early morning hours of September 20 was Brady. At about 2:00 a.m. Brady administered the oath of office to Arthur in Arthur's private apartment at 123 Lexington Avenue in New York City. After traveling to Washington, D.C., Arthur was inaugurated again two days later by Chief Justice of the United States Morrison R. Waite in a public Capitol Hill ceremony.

== Gallery ==
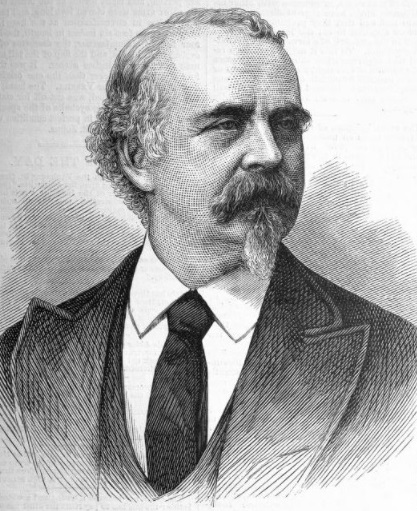
From the November 3, 1877 issue of Harper's Weekly

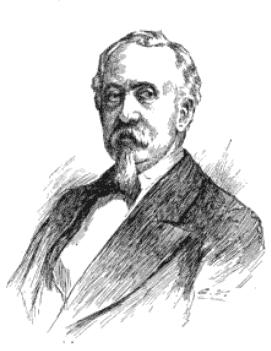
From the August 11, 1891 edition of The Illustrated American magazine.

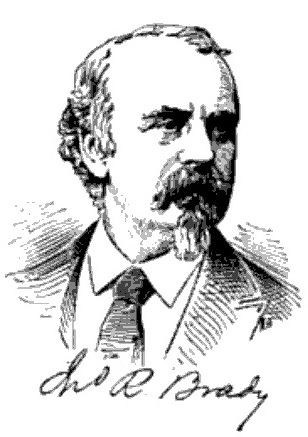
Brady as depicted in 1893's The National Cyclopedia of American Biography

== See also ==
- List of United States presidential inaugurations
