= Aron Steuer =

American lawyer

Aron Seth Walter Steuer (October 22, 1898 – December 7, 1985) was an American lawyer and judge from New York.

== Biography ==
Steuer was born on October 22, 1898, in New York City, New York, the son of lawyer Max D. Steuer and Bertha Popkin.

In May 1917, during World War I, Steuer enlisted as a private and was assigned to Company B, 304th Battalion, Tank Corps. He was promoted to corporal in July 1917. He sailed for France in October 1917. In May 1919, he returned to America and was discharged. He then received an A.B. war degree from Harvard College in 1920. He then went to Columbia Law School, graduating from there with an LL.B. in 1923. He was admitted to the bar in 1924 and began practicing law with the law firm White & Case. In 1928, he began practicing law with his father.

In 1930, Steuer became a City Court Justice. In 1932, he was elected New York Supreme Court Justice. He was still serving as Justice in 1961 when Governor Nelson Rockefeller appointed him to the Appellate Division, First Department. He was a Democrat, but Rockefeller's first choice for the Appellate Division, the Republican Justice Samuel H. Hofstadter, declined as he preferred to remain on the trial bench. When he reached the mandatory retirement age of 70, he was designated as supernumerary and continued to serve as Justice until 1974. Upon his retirement, the five Appellate Division Justices unanimously created the unsalaried position of Judicial Administrative Officer, which oversaw the courts' projects, and gave it to him. He continued to serve in that position until 1985, the year he died. In the 1970s, he and fellow retired Justice Louis Capozzoli began meeting with the parties in an appeal in an effort to reach a settlement. This became the Special Masters Program of the Appellate Division First Department and over the years was expanded and adopted formal court rules for its administration.

Steuer was considered a conservative in criminal cases, and one source described him as having an incisive legal thinking and concise style. An editor of the Columbia Law Review while attending Columbia Law School, he wrote the "Aesop in the Courts," a weekly series of legal fables in the New York Law Journal, from 1964 to 1979. He was outspoken on behalf of Jewish interests on several occasions, urging an investigation of conditions in Nazi Germany in 1935 before the United States participated in the 1936 Summer Olympics in Berlin.

Steuer became an associate director of the YMHA in 1925 and a board of governors member of Mt. Vernon Country Club in 1931. He was also a member of the business men's council of the Federation for the Support of Jewish Philanthropic Societies, the New York County Lawyers' Association, and Pi Lambda Phi. In 1928, he married Virginia Clark. Their children were Max D. and H. J. Clark.

Steuer died at home on December 7, 1985.
