= Helen Freedman =

American lawyer

Associate Justice of the First Judicial Department
- In office 2008–2014
- Appointed by: David Paterson

Justice on the New York Supreme Court, 1st Judicial District
- In office 1984–2008

Judge on the New York City Civil Court
- In office 1979–1984

Personal details
- Born: 1942 (age 83–84) New York
- Spouse: Henry Freedman
- Education: Smith College; New York University School of Law

Helen E. Freedman (born 1942) is an American former judge who served in the New York State court system for 36 years. From 2008 to 2014, she served as an associate justice of the New York Appellate Division of the Supreme Court, First Judicial Department.

== Early life and education ==
Freedman received a Bachelor of Arts degree from Smith College in 1963, and a Juris Doctor degree from New York University School of Law in 1967.

== Legal career ==
Freedman was elected as a Democrat to the New York City Civil Court in 1978. She served on that court 1979 to 1984. She was a New York Supreme Court Justice, from 1984 to 2008. She served on the Appellate Term of the Supreme Court, First Department, from 1995 to 1999 and later sat on the Commercial Division of the Supreme Court, as a specialized business court judge. In 2008, she was designated a Justice for the Appellate Division, First Judicial Department in by Governor David Paterson, and served in that position until she retired from the court effective October 31, 2014.

She also served on the Pattern Jury Instructions Committee of the Association of Justices of the New York Supreme Court and as a member of the New York State and Federal Judicial Council. She was also an adjunct Professor of Law at New York Law School. Freedman has served on the Board of New York County Lawyers Association. She has served as president of the New York State Association of Women Judges, and of Judges and Lawyers Breast Cancer Alert.

Freedman authored New York Objections, a book on best practices for making evidentiary objections at trial, as well as a chapter in the treatise Commercial Litigation in New York State Courts on coordinating litigation between New York's federal and state courts. She also authored the law review article, Selected Ethical Issues in Asbestos Litigation.

She now serves as a mediator with JAMS.

== Awards ==
Freedman has received a number of awards from the New York County Lawyers' Association, including the Louis J. Capozzoli Gavel Award in 2005, the Civil Practice Award in 2015, and the Civil Court Distinguished Service Award for Accomplishments in Enhancing the Status of Women in the Judiciary, in 2004. In 1998, she received the Award for Judicial Excellence from the State Trial Judges Conference of the American Bar Association, and she received a Smith College Medal for Judicial Independence in 2000.
