= Peter Tom (judge) =

American attorney

Associate Justice of the First Judicial Department
- In office 1994–2019
- Appointed by: Mario Cuomo

Acting Presiding Justice of the First Judicial Department
- In office 2016–2016
- Preceded by: Luis A. Gonzalez
- Succeeded by: Rolando T. Acosta
- In office 2009–2009
- Preceded by: Jonathan Lippman
- Succeeded by: Luis A. Gonzalez
- In office 2007–2007
- Preceded by: John T. Buckley
- Succeeded by: Jonathan Lippman

Justice of the New York Supreme Court
- In office 1990–1994

Judge on the New York City Civil Court
- In office 1985–1990

Personal details
- Education: Brooklyn Law School

Peter Tom is an American attorney who served as an associate justice of the Appellate Division of the Supreme Court, First Judicial Department from 1994 to 2019.

== Education ==
Tom received his bachelor's degree from the City College of New York, and in 1975, graduated Brooklyn Law School.

== Career ==
In 1976, he worked as a law clerk for the New York City Civil Court, working on both criminal and civil assignments. He was appointed as a judge on the housing court from 1985 to 1988 and a civil court from 1988 to 1990. He was a New York Supreme Court justice, from 1990 to 1994. He was designated a justice for the Appellate Division, First Judicial Department by Governor Mario Cuomo in 1994 and served as acting presiding justice in 2007, 2009, and 2016. He was the first Asian American elected to the New York State Supreme Court from New York County and the first Asian American to the Appellate Division of the Supreme Court.

== See also ==
- List of Asian American jurists
- List of first minority male lawyers and judges in New York

Legal offices
Preceded by Luis A. Gonzalez	Acting Presiding Justice of the First Judicial Department; 2016	Succeeded by Rolando T. Acosta
Preceded by John T. Buckley	Acting Presiding Justice of the First Judicial Department; 2007	Succeeded by Jonathan Lippman
Preceded by Jonathan Lippman	Acting Presiding Justice of the First Judicial Department; 2009	Succeeded by Luis A. Gonzalez
