= Louis Marcus =

Louis Marcus may refer to:

- Louis Marcus (mayor) (1880–1936), mayor of Salt Lake City
- Louis Marcus (filmmaker) (born 1936), Irish documentarian
- Louis W. Marcus (1863–1923), Jewish-American lawyer and judge from New York

== See also ==
- Marcus Louis (born 1983), French professional wrestler
