= Leventritt =

Leventritt may refer to:

- Leventritt Competition, international competition for classical pianists and violinists
- Leventritt Silver Ribbon Pairs, seniors bridge competition named for Peter Leventritt
- David Leventritt (1845–1926), American lawyer and judge
- Peter Leventritt (1916–1998, Peter A.), American bridge player
