= Luis A. González =

Luis A. González may refer to:

- Luis González (infielder) (born 1979), infielder in Major League Baseball
- Luis A. Gonzalez (judge), American judge
- Luis Alberto González, Colombian cyclist
