= Wasservogel =

Wasservogel is a surname. Notable people with the surname include:

- Isidor Wasservogel (1875–1962), Jewish Hungarian-American lawyer and judge
- Walter Wasservogel (1919–1993), Austrian ice hockey administrator
