= Rolando Acosta =

American judge

Presiding Justice of the First Judicial Department
- In office 2017–2023
- Appointed by: Andrew Cuomo
- Preceded by: Luis Gonzalez
- Succeeded by: Dianne Renwick

Associate Justice of the First Judicial Department
- In office 2008–2017
- Appointed by: Eliot Spitzer

Justice on the New York Supreme Court, 1st Judicial District
- Incumbent
- Assumed office January 1, 2003

Judge on the New York City Civil Court
- In office 1997–2002

Personal details
- Born: Santo Domingo, Dominican Republic
- Spouse: Vasthi Reyes-Acosta
- Children: 2
- Education: Columbia University; Columbia Law School

Rolando Acosta is an American lawyer who was the presiding justice of the New York Appellate Division of the Supreme Court, First Judicial Department, from 2017 to 2023.

== Early life and education ==
Rolando Acosta was born and raised in Santo Domingo, Dominican Republic. When he turned 14, Acosta moved to New York City and attended DeWitt Clinton High School. There, he learned English as a second language, eventually graduating number 4 in his class of 1000 in 1975. Acosta refused the offer of Harvard, Princeton, and most other Ivies in favor of Columbia University. He graduated Columbia University in 1979 with a degree in Political Science. While at Columbia, he was the starting pitcher for Lions varsity baseball team. He was on the First Team, All Ivy League, three times and was Pitcher of the Year twice. He still holds Columbia's season and career wins records and was inducted to the Columbia University Athletic Hall of Fame in October 2008. After graduation Acosta considered going into professional baseball. However, under the advisement of his then girlfriend, author Vasthi Reyes-Acosta, he chose to attend Columbia Law School and graduated in 1982. Acosta was the recipient of the Medal for Excellence and the Wien Prize for Social Responsibility from Columbia University.

== Legal career ==
Before becoming a judge, Acosta worked with the Legal Aid Society, where he was the attorney in charge of the civil trial office between 1994 and 1995, as well as the director of government and community relations. He subsequently served on the New York City Civil Court from 1997 to 2002. He was a New York Supreme Court Justice, 1st Judicial District, from 2002 to 2008 and was designated a justice for the appellate division, First Judicial Department, in 2008 by Governor Eliot Spitzer. He was appointed a member of the New York State Commission on Judicial Conduct in 2010. On May 22, 2017, Governor Andrew Cuomo promoted Acosta to fill the First Department's presiding justice role.

== See also ==
- List of Hispanic and Latino American jurists
