= Henry L. Sherman =

American lawyer and judge (1870 - 1933)

Henry Leo Sherman (December 5, 1870 – July 11, 1933) was a Jewish-American lawyer and judge from New York City.

== Life ==
Sherman was born on December 5, 1870, in New York City, New York, the son of merchant Aaron Scheuerman and Emma Schwab. His parents were of German descent. His surname was originally Scheuerman, although he later changed it to Sherman.

Sherman moved to Griffin, Georgia, with his family when he was young and received his early education there. He attended the Samuel Bailey Institute in Griffin, after which he went to Yale College. There, he had a two-years honors in political science, history, and law as well as an honorable mention for the Cobden Club Medal in his senior year. He graduated from Yale with a B.A. in 1890. He then studied law at Columbia Law School from 1890 to 1891 and at New York Law School from 1891 to 1892, graduating from the latter with an LL.B. He was admitted to the New York bar in 1892, after which he worked in the law office of Hoadley, Lauterbach & Johnson from 1892 to 1899. He was a member of the law firm from 1899 to 1907. He then worked as partner of the firm Hirsch, Sherman & Limburg from 1907 to 1927. He was a counsel for the Office of Alien Property Custodian from 1917 to 1918, and from 1926 to 1927 he served as a member of the committee for examination of character and fitness of applicants for admission to the Bar.

Sherman was a delegate to the 1912 Democratic National Convention. He was counsel for the Knickerbocker Trust Company when it was reorganized during the Panic of 1907. In 1924, Justice John V. McAvoy appointed him official counsel of his investigation of the transit situation. In 1926, Mayor Jimmy Walker appointed him a member of the City Planning and Survey Committee, the first official organization of its kind in the city. In 1927, he was elected Justice of the New York Supreme Court in New York County. He ran as the Democratic candidate and was endorsed by, among other people, Rabbi Stephen S. Wise, Samuel Untermyer, and Republican Louis Marshall. In 1930, Governor Franklin D. Roosevelt appointed him to the Appellate Division to succeed the retiring Justice Joseph M. Proskauer.

In 1931, during the Hofstadter Committee, Sherman granted a stay to Dr. William F. Doyle, a former Fire Department veterinarian who was appealing a thirty-day jail sentence for contempt of the Committee, following a telephone call from Tammany Hall leader John F. Curry. The Bar Association's executive committee investigated his actions, and while they didn't find anything that reflected on his impartiality, integrity or judicial conduct they concluded his part was an unfortunate intrusion. He served on the Court until his death.

Sherman was president of the Ruisseaumont Company of Lake Placid, a trustee of the Hebrew Orphan Asylum of New York, and a member of the New York State Bar Association, the New York City Bar Association, the New York County Lawyers' Association, the Society of Tammany, and the Society for Ethical Culture. In 1903, he married Edna Lucy Limburger. Their children were Ruth Therese, John Andrew, and Herbert Henry.

Sherman died at his summer home in Lake Placid from a lingering illness on July 11, 1933. His funeral was held in the Ethical Culture Society Building. Lawyer Emil Goldmark and Society for Ethical Culture leader John L. Elliott. The funeral was attended by, among other people, representatives from the United States Supreme Court, the New York Court of Appeals, and the New York State Supreme Court, Appellate Division, First Department. Judges from those courts served as the honorary pallbearers. His funeral cortege was headed by a police escort. He was buried in Salem Fields Cemetery.
