= New York Supreme Court, Appellate Division, First Department =

Court in New York State

Coordinates: 40°44′32″N 73°59′12″W

Supreme Court of the State of New York, Appellate Division, First Judicial Department
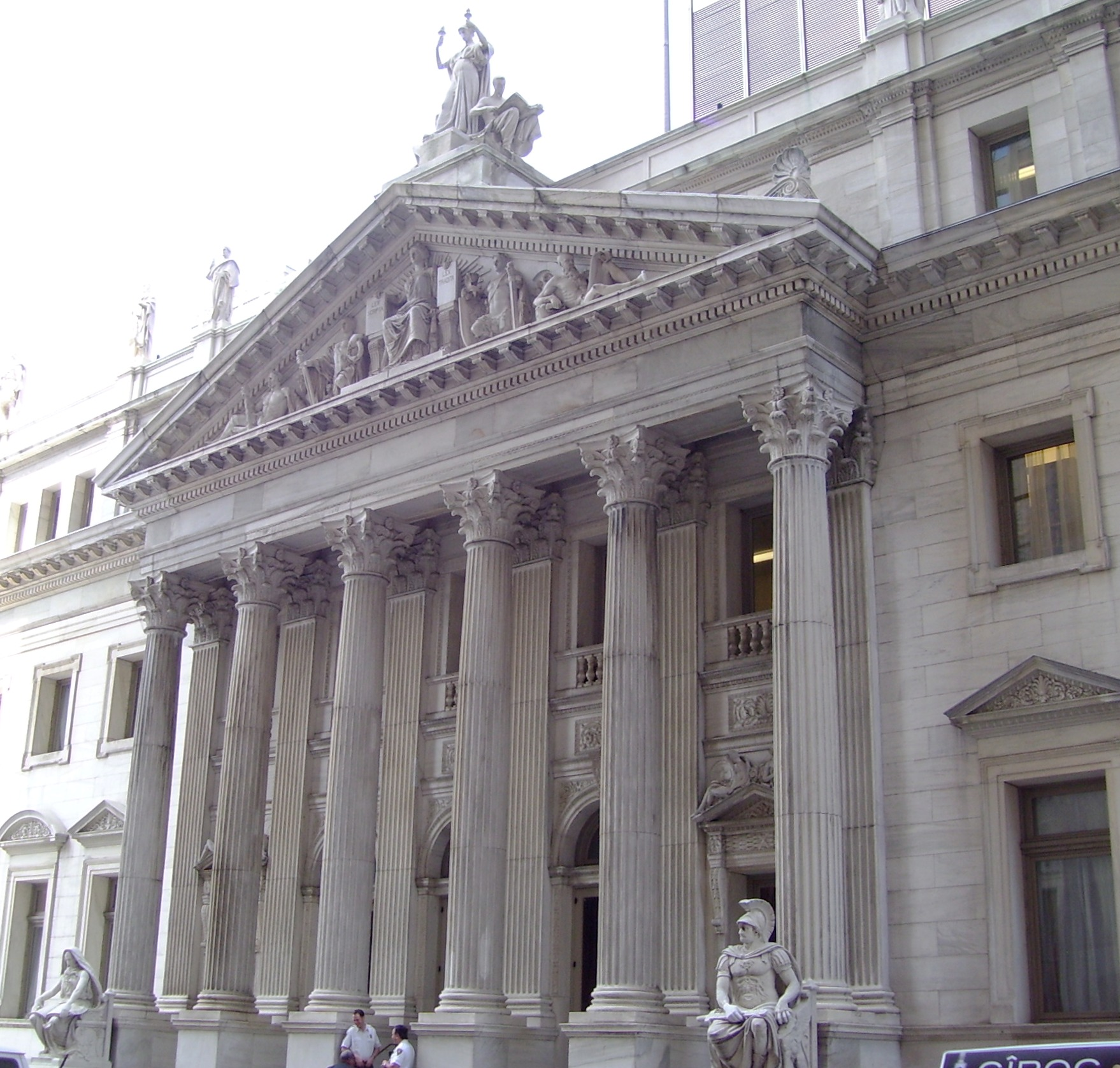
- First Department Courthouse in Rose Hill
- Interactive map of Supreme Court of the State of New York, Appellate Division, First Judicial Department
- Established: 1894
- Location: Manhattan, New York
- Composition method: Gubernatorial appointment
- Authorised by: Constitution of the State of New York
- Appeals to: New York Court of Appeals
- Website: www.nycourts.gov/courts/ad1/

The Supreme Court of the State of New York, Appellate Division, First Judicial Department, or simply the First Department, is one of the four geographical components of the New York Supreme Court, Appellate Division, the intermediate appellate court of the State of New York. Its courthouse is located in Manhattan, New York City.

== Jurisdiction ==
The First Department of the Appellate Division holds jurisdiction over the Counties of New York and the Bronx. Appeals are taken to the Appellate Division, as a matter of right, in civil and criminal cases, from the Supreme Court, Surrogate's Court, Family Court, and Court of Claims.

Along with the state's other three Appellate Departments, it shares responsibility for all admissions to the New York bar. Under the state's bar admission rules, all bar applicants must be interviewed in person by one of the Appellate Departments. The First Department admits only residents of Manhattan and the Bronx, with all other applicants being admitted by other Departments. However, once admitted by one department, a new attorney may practice in any New York state court.

== Case load ==
Over 3,000 appeals, 6,000 motions, and 1,000 interim applications are determined each year.

== Current justices ==
Name	Start	Appointer
Dianne Renwick, Presiding Justice	2008 (Note: Renwick was elevated to Presiding Justice by Kathy Hochul in 2023.)	David Paterson (D)
David Friedman	1999	George Pataki (R)
Sallie Manzanet-Daniels	2009	David Paterson (D)
Barbara Kapnick	2014	Andrew Cuomo (D)
Troy Webber	2016	Andrew Cuomo (D)
Ellen Gesmer	2016	Andrew Cuomo (D)
Peter Moulton	2017	Andrew Cuomo (D)
Lizbeth González	2019	Andrew Cuomo (D)
Tanya Kennedy	2020	Andrew Cuomo (D)
Saliann Scarpulla	2020	Andrew Cuomo (D)
Manuel Mendez	2020	Andrew Cuomo (D)
Martin Shulman	2020	Andrew Cuomo (D)
Julio Rodriguez	2021	Andrew Cuomo (D)
Bahaati Pitt-Burke	2021	Andrew Cuomo (D)
John Higgitt	2021	Andrew Cuomo (D)
Llinét Rosado	2023	Kathy Hochul (D)
Kelly O'Neill Levy	2023	Kathy Hochul (D)
Marsha Michael	2023	Kathy Hochul (D)
Margaret Chan	2025	Kathy Hochul (D)
Shlomo Hagler	2025	Kathy Hochul (D)
Matthew Parker-Raso	2026	Kathy Hochul (D)

== List of presiding justices ==
Presiding justices
No.	Name	Years	Ref.
1	Charles H. Van Brunt	1896–1905	
2	Morgan J. O'Brien	1905–1906	
3	Edward Patterson	1906–1910	
4	George Landon Ingraham	1910–1915	
5	John Proctor Clarke	1916–1926	
6	Victor J. Dowling	1927–1931	
7	Edward R. Finch	1931–1935	
8	Francis W. Martin	1935–1947	
9	David W. Peck	1947–1957	
10	Bernard Botein	1958–1968	
11	Harold A. Stevens	1969–1974	
12	Owen McGivern	1974–1975	
13	Harold A. Stevens	1975–1977	
14	Francis T. Murphy	1977–1997	
15	Alfred D. Lerner	1998	
16	Betty Weinberg Ellerin	1999	
17	Joseph P. Sullivan	2000–2001	
18	Milton L. Williams	2002	
19	John T. Buckley	2003–2006	
20	Jonathan Lippman	2007–2009	
21	Luis A. Gonzalez	2009–2015	
22	Rolando Acosta	2017–2023	
23	Dianne Renwick	2023–present	

== Former notable justices ==
- George C. Barrett (1896–1900)
- Charles H. Van Brunt (1896–1905, P.J. 1896–1905)
- William Rumsey (1896–1901)
- Pardon C. Williams (1896–1898)
- Morgan J. O’Brien (1896–1906, P.J. 1905–1906)
- George L. Ingraham (1896–1915, P.J. 1910–1915)
- Alton B. Parker (1897)
- Chester B. McLaughlin (1898–1917)
- Edward W. Hatch (1900–1905)
- John P. Clarke (1905–1926, P.J. 1916–1926)
- Nathan L. Miller (1910–1913)
- Victor J. Dowling (1911–1931, P.J. 1927–1931)
- Alfred R. Page (1916–1923)
- Vernon M. Davis (1916–1918)
- Clarence J. Shearn (1916–1919)
- Eugene A. Philbin (1920)
- Samuel Greenbaum (1920–1922)
- Edward R. Finch (1922–1935, P.J. 1931–1935)
- Francis W. Martin (1923–1947, P.J. 1935–1947)
- Robert F. Wagner (1926)
- Joseph M. Proskauer (1927–1930)
- Henry L. Sherman (1930–1933)
- Edward J. Glennon (1933–1954)
- Irwin Untermyer (1933–1945)
- Albert Cohn (1936–1955)
- Joseph M. Callahan (1937–1955)
- David W. Peck (1945–1957, P.J. 1947–1957)
- Isidor Wasservogel (1945)
- John Van Voorhis (1947–1953)
- Bernard L. Shientag (1947–1952)
- Charles D. Breitel (1952–1966)
- Francis Bergan (1952–1963)
- Sydney F. Foster (1952–1953)
- Bernard Botein (1953–1968, P.J. 1958–1968)
- Benjamin J. Rabin (1955–1968)
- Harold A. Stevens (1958–1974, 1975–1977, P.J. 1969–1974, 1975–1977)
- Samuel W. Eager (1960–1972)
- Aron Steuer (1961–1974)
- Louis J. Capozzoli (1966–1977)
- Theodore R. Kupferman (1971–1996)
- Myles J. Lane (1973–1979)
- Paul J. Yesawich, Jr. (1974–1981)
- Harold Birns (1975–1982)
- Samuel J. Silverman (1975–1984)
- John Carro (1979–1994)
- E. Leo Milonas (1982–1993, 1996–1998)
- Bentley Kassal (1982–1993)
- Fritz W. Alexander II (1982–1985)
- George Bundy Smith (1987–1992)
- Peter Tom (1994-2019, Acting P.J. 2007, 2009, 2016–2017)
- Richard Andrias (1996-2018)
- Alfred D. Lerner (1998–2004, P.J. 1998)
- David B. Saxe (1998–2017)
- Luis A. Gonzalez (2002–2015, P.J. 2009–2015)
- John Sweeny (2004-2019)
- Jonathan Lippman (2007–2009, P.J. 2007–2009)
- James M. Catterson (2004–2012)
- Karla Moskowitz (2008–2017)
- Helen E. Freedman (2008–2014)
- Leland G. DeGrasse (2008–2015)
- Sheila Abdus-Salaam (2009–2013)
- Nelson S. Román (2009–2013)
- Rosalyn Richter (2009–2020)
- Darcel D. Clark (2012–2015)
- Paul G. Feinman (2012–2017)

== Notable cases ==
- Pando v. Fernandez
- People v. Jovanovic
- Stambovsky v. Ackley

== See also ==
- New York Court of Appeals
- New York State Supreme Court, Appellate Division, Second Department
- New York State Supreme Court, Appellate Division, Fourth Department
