= Caterson =

Caterson is a surname. Notable people with the surname include:

- Dale Caterson (born 1961), Australian rower
- Fred Caterson (1919–2000), Australian politician

== See also ==
- Catterson
