= Karla Moskowitz =

American lawyer

Associate Justice of the First Judicial Department
- In office 2008–2017
- Appointed by: Eliot Spitzer

Justice on the New York Supreme Court, 1st Judicial District
- In office 1987–2008

Judge on the New York City Civil Court
- In office 1982–1987

Personal details
- Education: Alfred University (BA 1963), cum laude Columbia Law School (JD 1966)

Karla Moskowitz is a retired Associate Justice of the New York Appellate Division of the Supreme Court, First Judicial Department.

== Early life and education ==
Moskowitz received a Bachelor of Arts degree, cum laude, from Alfred University in 1963. She received a Juris Doctor degree from Columbia Law School in 1966.

== Legal career ==
=== Attorney ===
Prior to joining the bench, among other things, she worked with the State Attorney General’s office, New York City Human Resources Administration, and served as an arbitrator for the Small Claims Division of the Civil Court. She also worked as an attorney in private practice.

=== Judicial career ===
Moskowitz was as an Administrative Law Judge for the New York State Department of Health. She was elected to the New York City Civil Court in 1982, and served on that court from 1982 to 1987. She was appointed as an acting New York Supreme Court Justice in 1987, and served on that court from 1987 to 2008. Moskowitz sat on the Commercial Division, New York’s business court, from 2001 until her appointment to the New York Supreme Court's Appellate Division in January 2008. She was originally appointed as an acting Supreme Court justice in 1987, then elected as a justice to the Supreme Court in 1991, and was re-elected in 2005. Moskowitz was designated as a Justice for the Appellate Division, First Judicial Department in 2008 by Governor Eliot Spitzer. She retired from the Appellate Division in 2017.

In 2018, she was appointed a Special Master of the First Department’s pre-argument mediation program.

She now serves as an arbitrator and mediator with NAM (National Arbitration and Mediation).

== Honors and awards ==
Among other honors and awards, Moskowitz has received;

- Honorary degree of Doctor of Laws, Alfred University (2008) and delivered the commencement address that year
- Jurist of the Year Award, Metropolitan Black Bar Association (2005)
- Abigail Allen Award, Alfred University (2004)
- Edith I. Spivack Award, New York County Lawyers' Association's Women's Rights Committee (2003)
- Joan L. Ellenbogen Founder’s Award, Women’s Bar Association of the State of New York (1999)
- Women of Valor Award, Women’s Medical Association of New York City (1995)

== Positions ==
Moskowitz served as president of the New York State Association of Women Judges. She also served as president of the National Association of Women Judges. She was a founder and co-president of Judges and Lawyers Breast Cancer Alert (JALBCA), and remains on its board of directors. She is a charter member of the American College of Business Court Judges. From 2003 to 2005, she co-chaired the Summary Jury Trials Committee of the Jury Trial Project of the New York State Courts. She has been an executive committee member of the Commercial and Federal Litigation Section of the New York State Bar Association (NYSBA), and chaired its appellate committee. She has been an executive committee member of the NYSBA's Trial Lawyers and co-chaired its dispute resolution committee.
