= Kenneth O'Brien =

Kenneth O'Brien (March 15, 1895-January 20, 1954) was an American lawyer and New York Supreme Court judge.

== Biography ==
O'Brien was born in 1895, the son of New York Supreme Court Justice Morgan J. O' Brien and Rose Mary Crimmins. He attended Yale University and later Fordham University Law School. In 1932, he served as the chairman of Herbert Lehman's gubernatorial campaign. He also served as the treasurer of the Democratic National Committee. He became a Justice of the New York Supreme Court in 1934, appointed by Governor Lehman to replace Justice Curtis A. Peters.

During his 1934 gubernatorial campaign, Robert Moses accused Lehman of appointing O'Brien to the Court as a reward for political favors O'Brien's law firm had performed, arguing that O'Brien's appointment was not the result of "knowledge and experience but influence".

== Personal life ==
He married Katherine Mackay, daughter of Clarence H. Mackay, in 1922. Before the ceremony, the couple received the papal benediction from Pope Pius XI. Katherine was granted a divorce in 1937, on the grounds of mental cruelty. O'Brien served as the model for a minor character in John O'Hara's novel BUtterfield 8.
