= Catterson =

Catterson is a surname. Notable people with the surname include:

- Eileen Catterson, Scottish fashion model and former Miss Scotland
- James M. Catterson, Associate Justice of the New York Appellate Division of the Supreme Court, First Judicial Department
- Robert Francis Catterson (1835–1914), American physician and soldier
- Tom Catterson (1884–1920), professional baseball player who played outfield from 1908 to 1909 for the Brooklyn Superbas
