= George Landon Ingraham =

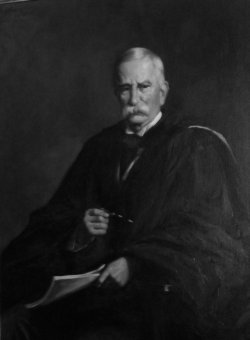
- Ingraham as Presiding Justice of New York Supreme Court, Appellate Division, 1910

Presiding Justice of the First Judicial Department
- In office 1910–1915
- Appointed by: Charles Evans Hughes
- Preceded by: Edward Patterson
- Succeeded by: John Proctor Clarke

Personal details
- Born: August 1, 1847 New York City, New York, U.S.
- Died: January 24, 1931 (aged 83) New York City, New York], U.S.
- Spouse: Georgina Lent Ingraham
- Children: Daniel Phoenix Ingraham
- Education: Columbia University (1863)

George Landon Ingraham (August 1, 1847 – January 24, 1931) was a lawyer and judge in New York City.

== Biography ==
Ingraham was born in New York City in 1847 to Mary Landon Ingraham and Daniel P. Ingraham, the presiding justice for the First District of the New York State Supreme Court. He graduated from Columbia Law School in 1869, was admitted to the New York City Bar Association the same year, and began a lucrative law practice. In 1882 he was elected to a judgeship on the Superior Court of New York City. In 1891 he was appointed to the New York State Supreme Court by New York Governor David B. Hill. He became one of the first associate justices of the Appellate Division, First Judicial Department of the Supreme Court of New York State upon formation of its appellate divisions in 1896. He became presiding justice in 1910, and remained in that position until his retirement in 1915.

After leaving the bench, Justice Ingraham continued to serve as Director of The Equitable Life Assurance Society of the United States, president of the New York City Bar Association (1917–1918), Chairman of the District Appeals Draft Board, official referee of the 1st Judicial District of the Supreme Court, and vice president of New York Law Institute.

== Sources ==
- Biography of George Landon Ingraham. Appellate Division First Department, New York State Court System.
- “Gov. Hill Appoints Judges; George L. Ingraham and H.A. Gildersleeve the Lucky Men.” The New York Times. April 17, 1891.
