= Louis W. Marcus =

American judge (1863–1923)

Louis William Marcus (May 18, 1863 – August 18, 1923) was a Jewish-American lawyer and judge from Buffalo, New York. He was a justice of the New York Supreme Court.

== Early life ==
Marcus was born on May 18, 1863, in Buffalo, New York, the son of Leopold and Amelia Marcus. Marcus attended public school and Williams Academy. He then went to Cornell Law School, graduating from there with an LL.B. in 1889.

== Career ==
Marcus was admitted to the bar when he was twenty five, and in 1890 he helped form the law firm Swift, Weaver & Marcus. When Swift withdrew from the firm in 1892, it continued under the name Weaver & Marcus. The firm ended with Weaver's death in 1894.

In 1895, Marcus was elected judge of the Surrogate's Court of Erie County as a Republican. He was re-elected judge in 1901. In 1905, Governor Frank W. Higgins appointed him Justice of the New York Supreme Court to succeed the retiring Edward W. Hatch. He was elected to the position in 1906, and in 1920 he was re-elected for a fourteen-year term. He served as Justice until his death.

== Personal life ==
In 1889, he married Ray H. Dahlman. Following Ray's death in 1917, he lived with his sister Rosalind C. Marcus. Marcus was a member of Delta Kappa Epsilon, the Freemasons, the Shriners, the Buffalo Club, and the Country Club.

Marcus died from a year's long illness on August 18, 1923. He was buried in Forest Lawn Cemetery.
