= James Campbell Matthews =

American attorney and judge (1844–1930)

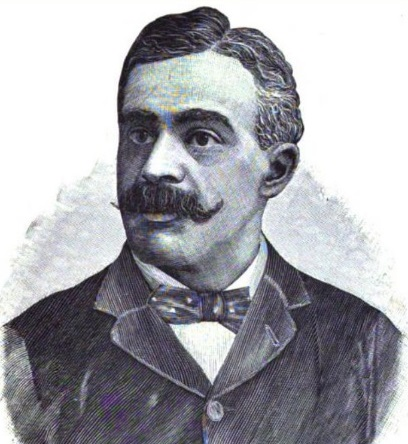
- James C. Matthews, Albany, New York attorney and judge.

Recorder of Deeds for the District of Columbia
- In office August 19, 1886 – March 3, 1887
- Appointed by: Grover Cleveland
- Preceded by: Frederick Douglass
- Succeeded by: James M. Trotter

Judge of the Albany Recorder's Court
- In office January 1, 1896 – December 31, 1899
- Preceded by: Albert Hessberg
- Succeeded by: Lyman H. Bevans

Personal details
- Born: November 6, 1844 New Haven, Connecticut, US
- Died: November 1, 1930 (aged 85) Albany, New York, US
- Resting place: Albany Rural Cemetery, Menands, New York
- Party: Republican (Before 1872); Democratic (From 1872)
- Spouse: Adella Duplessis (m. 1875)
- Children: 1
- Education: Albany Law School
- Profession: Attorney; Judge

James Campbell Matthews (November 6, 1844—November 1, 1930) was an Albany, New York attorney and judge. He was notable as the first African American law school graduate in New York. He was elected a municipal judge in the late 1890s, which was the highest judicial office attained by an African-American up to that time.

== Early life ==
James C. Matthews was born in New Haven, Connecticut on November 6, 1844. His father was a barber, and the family moved to Albany when James Matthews was a boy. His parents died in 1861, and Matthews was raised by Lydia Mott and Phebe Jones, two Albany anti-slavery activists who later worked in support of racial integration.

Though Albany's schools were segregated, Matthews succeeded in attending the public schools attended by white students. He then won a scholarship to The Albany Academy, and succeeded in winning acceptance despite objections "by canting hypocrytes in the Republican fold." Matthews was a stellar student who won Best English Essay and the Beck Literary Medal, graduating in 1864.

Matthews worked initially as a clerk at Albany's Congress Hotel, and was later employed as a bookkeeper. After deciding on a legal career, Matthews began studies at Albany Law School. He graduated in 1870, was admitted to the bar, and practiced in Albany.

== Career ==
Most African-Americans of the 1800s who were able to vote and participate in the political process joined the Republican Party, which was viewed favorably as having eliminated slavery during the American Civil War. Matthews was initially active as a Republican, but later became notable for his decision to join Albany's Democratic Party.

In 1885 President Grover Cleveland nominated Matthews to serve as Recorder of Deeds for the District of Columbia, a position previously held by Frederick Douglass. He held the position by virtue of a recess appointment, but the U.S. Senate, then controlled by Republicans, refused to confirm him, claiming that he had attempted to coerce other African-Americans in Albany to switch their allegiance to the Democratic Party in local elections.

Matthews won the election for Judge of Albany's Recorder's Court in 1895. At the time he took office, Matthews held the highest judicial position of any African-American up to that time. He served until 1899, when Albany's Republicans won the city elections and reclaimed control of the municipal government.

== Later life ==
After leaving the bench, Matthews resumed the practice of law, and remained active until he retired in the early 1920s.

== Death and burial ==
Matthews died in Albany on November 1, 1930. He was buried at Albany Rural Cemetery, Section 28, Lot 95.

== Family ==
In 1875 Matthews married Adella Duplessis of New York City. They were the parents of a son, Charles D. Matthews.

== Legacy ==
Albany Law School's faculty includes an endowed professorship, the James Campbell Matthews Distinguished Professor of Jurisprudence.

In 2013 Albany Law School inaugurated the James Campbell Matthews Lecture Series.

== See also ==
- List of African-American jurists
- List of first minority male lawyers and judges in New York

Political offices
Preceded by Frederick Douglass	Recorder of Deeds for the District of Columbia; August 19, 1886–March 3, 1887	Succeeded by James M. Trotter
Preceded by Albert Hessberg	Judge of the Albany, New York Recorder's Court; January 1, 1896–December 31, 1899	Succeeded by Lyman H. Bevans
