= E. Leo Milonas =

American lawyer (1936–2024)

Elias Leo Milonas

Chief Administrative Judge of the State of New York
- In office 1993–1995
- Nominated by: Judith S. Kaye
- Succeeded by: Jonathan Lippman

6th Chair of the New York Commission on Judicial Nomination
- In office February 6, 2019 – January 2, 2024
- Preceded by: Alan Mansfield (interim)

Personal details
- Born: Elias Leo Milonas; October 23, 1936 New York City, U.S.
- Died: January 2, 2024 (aged 87) New York City, U.S.
- Spouse: Helen Gamanos (m. 1960)
- Children: 2
- Education: City College of New York; Brooklyn Law School

Elias Leo Milonas (October 23, 1936 – January 2, 2024) was an American judge and lawyer who served for 26 years as a judge in New York State. He chaired the New York Commission on Judicial Nomination from 2019 until his death, and retired from his position as a partner with the law firm Pillsbury Winthrop at the end of 2023.

== Background ==
Elias Leo Milonas, the son of Greek immigrant parents, was born in 1936 and grew up in Washington Heights, Manhattan. He graduated from the City College of New York with a bachelor's degree in 1957, and from Brooklyn Law School with an L.L.B. in 1960.

== Career ==
Milonas served as an associate justice for the Appellate Division of the Supreme Court, First Judicial Department from 1982 to 1998; he was Chief Administrative Judge of the State of New York from 1993 to 1995, Deputy Chief Administrative Judge for New York City Courts from 1979 to 1981, and he served as state Supreme Court justice from 1978 to 1979. Prior to that, Milonas served as an Acting Supreme Court Justice, and Supervising Judge for New York County Criminal Court and the Bronx Criminal Court.

Milonas was a partner at the law firm Pillsbury Winthrop, where he specialized in complex commercial litigation, appeals, and alternative dispute resolution. His clients have included General Electric, Viacom, Pfizer, Schering-Plough, Deutsche Bank, Bank of New York, American Express, and The Bank of Cyprus.

== Civic involvement ==
Milonas was involved with numerous civic and governmental institutions. From 2002 to 2004 he served as president of the New York City Bar Association. He has also served as a fellow of the American Bar Association; Director of the Legal Aid Society; Director of the Fund for Modern Courts; board member of the New York Urban League; and board member for the Fund for the City of New York, among other offices.

On February 6, 2019, the New York Commission on Judicial Nomination elected Milonas to be its chair, succeeding Alan Mansfield, who had served that role in an interim capacity since the death of Judith Kaye in 2016.

== Personal life and death ==
Milonas married Helen Gamanos in 1960, and they had two daughters. He died of heart failure on January 2, 2024, at his home in Riverdale, Bronx. He was 87.

== Sources ==
- Pillsbury Winthrop Biography
- Appellate Division Biography
- “E. Leo Milonas Joins National Board of State Courts.” National Board of State Courts. Press Release. October 15, 2003.
