= David Saxe (judge) =

American judge

David B. Saxe

Associate Justice of the First Judicial Department
- In office 1998–2017
- Appointed by: George Pataki

Justice on the New York Supreme Court
- In office 1986–1998

Judge on the New York City Civil Court
- In office 1982–1985

Personal details
- Born: December 30, 1942 (age 83) The Bronx, New York
- Education: Columbia College; Case Western Reserve University School of Law; New York University School of Law

David B. Saxe (born December 30, 1942) was an associate justice of the New York Appellate Division of the Supreme Court, First Judicial Department.

== Early life and education ==
Justice Saxe earned his bachelor's degree at Columbia College in 1963. He received his JD from Case Western Reserve University School of Law in 1966 and an LL.M. from New York University School of Law in 1972.

== Legal career ==
Following law school, Judge Saxe clerked under Shanley N. Egeth. He was the consumer advocate and director of law enforcement for the New York City Consumer Affairs Department before becoming a lecturer and assistant professor of law at the City University of New York School of Law. He also maintained a private practice in Manhattan before joining the bench in which he specialized in representing tenants in co-op and condominium conversions and landlord-tenant matters; conducted a general civil practice with an emphasis on litigation; represented the rights of schoolchildren and their parents as well as handicapped children; and represented family members in family court; in addition to advocating for the consumer and doing appellate work.

Judge Saxe served on the New York City Civil Court from 1982 to 1985 and on the New York Supreme Court from 1986 to 1998. In 1998, he was designated as an associate justice for the Appellate Division, First Judicial Department, by New York Governor George Pataki. He served on that court until retiring from the bench effective February 28, 2017. He is currently a partner in the law firm of Morrison Cohen LLP in Manhattan.
