= Jonathan Lippman =

American judge (born 1945)

Chief Judge of the New York Court of Appeals
- In office February 13, 2009 – December 31, 2015
- Appointed by: David Paterson
- Preceded by: Carmen Beauchamp Ciparick (acting)
- Succeeded by: Eugene F. Pigott Jr. (acting)

Presiding Justice of the First Judicial Department
- In office 2007–2009
- Appointed by: Eliot Spitzer
- Preceded by: Peter Tom
- Succeeded by: Peter Tom

Chief Administrative Judge of the State of New York
- In office 1996–2007
- Appointed by: Judith S. Kaye
- Preceded by: E. Leo Milonas
- Succeeded by: Ann Pfau

Personal details
- Born: May 19, 1945 (age 81) New York City, U.S.
- Education: New York University (B.A, J.D)

Jonathan Lippman (born May 19, 1945) is an American jurist who served as Chief Judge of the New York Court of Appeals from 2009 through 2015. As of 2026, Lippman is of counsel in the Litigation & Trial Department of Latham & Watkins’ New York office.

== Early life and education ==
Lippman is a Manhattan native. He attended New York City public schools, including Stuyvesant High School, graduated from New York University (NYU) in 1965, and received his J.D. degree from the New York University School of Law in 1968.

== Legal career ==
In 1989, he became the deputy chief administrator for management support of the New York State court system, responsible for the day-to-day management. In 1995, then-Governor George Pataki appointed Lippman as judge of the New York Court of Claims. In 1996, Lippman became New York's chief administrative judge. He served in that capacity for 11 years until 2007, the longest anyone has spent in that position. In 2005, he was elected to the State Supreme Court for a 14-year term. In May 2007, then-Governor, Eliot Spitzer, appointed Lippman to the Appellate Division of the Supreme Court, First Judicial Department.

On January 13, 2009, Governor David Paterson appointed Lippman to the position of Chief Judge of the New York Court of Appeals. Lippman was chosen from a list provided to Paterson by the New York Commission on Judicial Nomination, in a process that drew scrutiny in 2008 when the commission did not refer any female or minority candidates to the governor for selection. Lippman was confirmed in his position by voice vote of the State Senate on February 12, 2009. He succeeded Judith Kaye, who served as the state's first female Chief Judge from 1993 to 2008.

Much of Lippman's career in the justice system in New York has been in administrative roles. He has been credited with persuading the state legislature to double the financing of the court system and pass other reform measures creating special purpose courts and updating the jury system. Justice Lippman wrote a summary of this work in January 2009 in the New York Law Journal. His resume as an appellate judge has been described as "thin," but in the 20 months that he was Presiding Justice of the Appellate Division, First Department he presided over more than 2,000 cases and wrote 14 opinions.

=== Tenure as Chief Judge ===
Under Chief Judge Lippman, the number of non-unanimous rulings made by the Court of Appeals has been on the rise. According to the court, unanimous rulings declined from about 82 percent during 2008, Judge Kaye’s final year, to 69 percent in Judge Lippman’s first year.

When wearing his hat as Chief Judge of the State of New York, Lippman has been a consistent advocate for increased attention to civil legal services. In addition to creating the Task Force to Expand Access to Civil Legal Services in New York, he has increased funding to civil legal services, enacted mandatory pro bono requirements for law students, and proposed making attorney pro bono reporting requirements public to encourage greater participation. These proposals have been somewhat controversial and the plan to make pro bono hours public has not been enacted.

Lippman stepped down as Chief Judge on December 31, 2015, having reached the mandatory retirement age of 70.

=== Private practice ===
Lippman joined Latham & Watkins’ New York office as of counsel in the Litigation & Trial Department on January 7, 2016 upon retirement from the bench.

Legal offices
Preceded by Carmen Beauchamp Ciparick; Acting	Chief Judge of the New York Court of Appeals; 2009–2015	Succeeded by Eugene F. Pigott Jr. Acting
