= Richard Andrias =

American lawyer

Richard T. Andrias

Associate Justice of the First Judicial Department
- In office 1996–2018
- Appointed by: George Pataki

Justice on the New York Supreme Court
- In office 1987–1996

Judge on the New York City Criminal Court
- In office 1983–1987

Personal details
- Born: 1943 (age 82–83) New York, U.S.
- Education: Bowdoin College; London School of Economics; Columbia Law School

Richard Thompson Andrias (born 1943) was an associate justice of the New York Appellate Division of the Supreme Court, First Judicial Department.

== Early life and education ==
He is a 1965 graduate of Bowdoin College and a 1970 graduate of Columbia Law School. He also attended the Graduate Law School of the London School of Economics.

He served in Vietnam as an Army Intelligence Officer with the First Air Cavalry Division and was awarded the Bronze Star and Air Medal.

== Legal career ==
Prior to joining the bench, he was a trial lawyer for the Legal Aid Society's Criminal Defense Division and in private practice, doing primarily corporate and commercial litigation. He subsequently served on the New York City Criminal Court from 1983 to 1987. He was a New York Supreme Court Justice, from 1987 to 1996. He was designated as a Justice for the Appellate Division, First Judicial Department in 1996 by Governor George Pataki, and served on that court until his retirement in 2018.

He teaches trial practice at Pace Law School
