= Isidor Wasservogel =

American judge

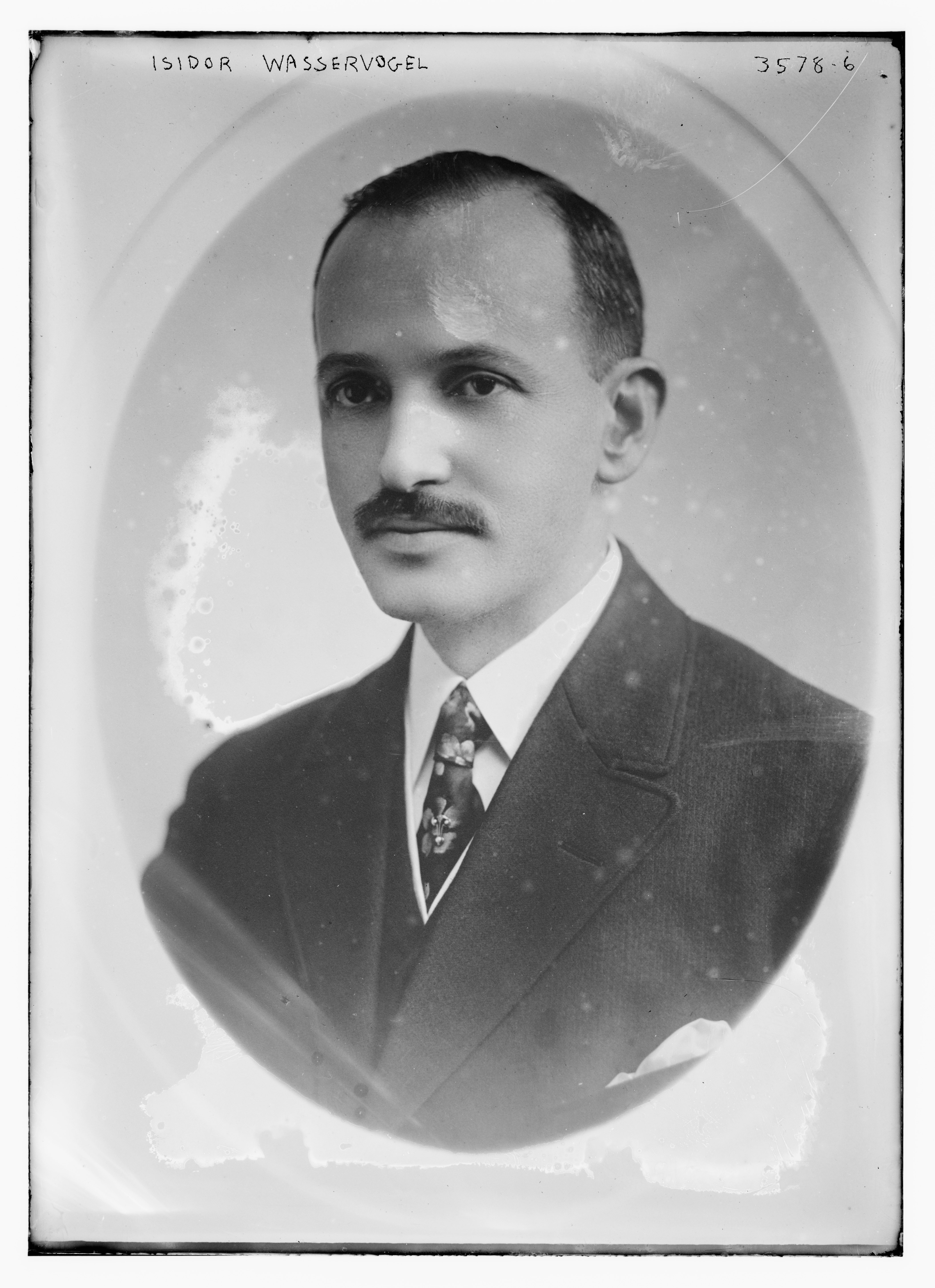
Isidor Wasservogel LCCN2014699729.jpg

Isidor Wasservogel (December 25, 1875 – February 8, 1962) was a Jewish Hungarian-American lawyer and judge from New York.

== Life ==
Wasservogel was born on December 25, 1875, in Budapest, the Kingdom of Hungary, the son of Max Wasservogel and Katherine Hoffman.

Wasservogel immigrated to America in 1880. He attended the College of the City of New York, and graduated from the New York Law School with an LL.B. in 1896. He began practicing law in New York City later that year. He specialized in real estate and commercial law. He was a member of the law firm Wasservogel & Medalie.

From 1910 to 1916, Wasservogel served as assistant and acting New York County District Attorney. In this role, he obtained the first conviction based exclusively on finger print evidence in 1912. He was elected to the New York Supreme Court in 1920. He was re-elected in 1934.

While on the Supreme Court, Wasservogel investigated ambulance-chasing lawyers and accident claim agents. His inquiry lead to 74 members of the New York bar being disciplined and several recommendations to cut down on ambulance chasing, including lawyers not receiving more than a third of won personal injury damages and the court supervising the fees. Governor Dewey appointed him to the Appellate Division First Department in August 1945, but he retired from the Court at the end of the year as he hit the constitutional age limit. He spent the next three years working in his old law firm, Wasservogel & Sylvester. He then became an official referee for the Appellate Division until 1951 due to the statutory age limit. In 1952, he special referee for equity cases in the Supreme Court, which he did without compensation.

Wasservogel was a Republican. He was a member of the New York City Bar Association, the New York State Bar Association, the New York County Lawyers' Association, the Knights of Pythias, and B'nai B'rith. In 1906, he married Dorothy Mass. They had no children. She died in 1950.

Wasservogel died in Doctors Hospital on February 8, 1962.
