= Edward W. Hatch =

American judge

Edward Wingate Hatch (November 26, 1852 – June 1, 1924) was an American lawyer and judge from New York.

== Life ==
Hatch was born on November 26, 1852, in Friendship, New York, the son of Captain Jeremiah Hatch and Lucy Ann Rigdon. During the American Civil War, his father became captain in the 130th New York Infantry Regiment and died of sickness in Suffolk, Virginia, in 1862. His maternal grandfather was Sidney Rigdon.

Hatch attended the academy in Friendship until he was 16. He then spent the next four years working as a blacksmith and engaged in lumbering in Pennsylvania and Wyoming County. In 1872, he began working for Andrew J. Lorish, then postmaster of Attica and later county judge of Wyoming County, as a clerk in the post office. He also studied law under Lorish.

In 1874, he moved to Buffalo and studied law in the office Corlett & Tabor; Corlett later joined the New York Supreme Court while Tabor later served as New York Attorney General. When the law firm was dissolved in 1875, Hatch continued studying law with Corlett. He was admitted to the bar in 1876. He spent the next two years practicing law alone, and then he formed a partnership with Corlett. The partnership lasted until 1883, when Corlett became a judge. In 1884, he formed the law firm Box, Hatch & Norton with Porter Norton and H. W. Box. He was in the law firm until 1887, when he became a judge.

In 1880, Hatch was elected District Attorney of Erie County as a Republican. He was re-elected to the office in 1883. In 1895, he was elected to the New York Supreme Court, Eighth Judicial District.

In 1896, Governor Morton designated him an Associate Justice on the New York Supreme Court, Appellate Division, Second Department. In 1900, Governor Roosevelt transferred him to the First Department. In 1905, he resigned from the Supreme Court to return to his law practice. He immediately formed a law firm in New York City with former Chief Judge of the New York Court of Appeals Alton B. Parker and former New York Lieutenant Governor William F. Sheehan under the name Parker, Hatch & Sheehan. After the firm was dissolved in 1912, he continued practicing with Sheehan under the firm name Hatch & Sheehan. The firm ended in 1915, and Hatch continued to practice alone until two years before his death, when due to poor health he didn't engage in an active practice.

Hatch was a member of the American Bar Association, the New York County Lawyers' Association, the Union League Club, the Manhattan Club, the New York State Bar Association, the New York City Bar Association, and the Freemasons. He also spent a few years as a faculty member of the Buffalo Law School.

In 1878, he married Helen Stafford Woodruff. Their children were Edward J. and Florence W.

Hatch died at his summer home in Friendship on June 1, 1924.

He was cremated in Buffalo and his ashes were buried in Maple Grove Cemetery in Friendship.
