= Jaime Rios (judge) =

American judge

Jaime Rios is a judge on the New York Supreme Court for Queens County. Prior to sitting on the Supreme Court, Judge Rios served on the New York City Civil Court and the Housing Court. Judge Rios holds a B.S. degree from City College of New York, a M.A. degree from New York University, and a law degree from Fordham University School of Law. Following law school, Judge Rios was a prosecutor in Kings County and later an attorney for the New York City Police Department. He also teaches landlord/tenant law at Fordham as an adjunct professor. He is also a co-chair of Fordham's Minority Mentorship Program for law students. Judge Rios retired from the bench in December 2013. Many attorneys mourned his retirement, noting that he was a consistent and fair jurist whose understanding of the law was generally above reproach.

== Tyronne Johnson case ==
In 2005, Judge Rios' conduct in the second murder trial of Tyronne Johnson came under scrutiny. Johnson's first conviction for the murder of nightclub owner Leroy Vann was overturned by Judge Rios when it was revealed that a prosecutor lied about the whereabouts of a defense witness. Judith Memblatt, the judge's former law clerk, accused him of improperly coaching the prosecutor in the second trial, Eugene Riebstein. Based on Memblatt's allegations, Johnson's defense attorney Ron Kuby sought to overturn this second conviction. In support of the motion to vacate the conviction, Kuby took the unorthodox step of calling Judge Rios as a witness to address the allegation, but Rios denied any misconduct. Memblatt has gone on to become a blogger highly critical of the New York state judiciary as a whole. In October 2006, Judge Matthew D'Emic denied Johnson's motion to overturn the conviction, finding no misconduct on Rios' part.

== See also ==
- List of Hispanic and Latino American jurists
- List of first minority male lawyers and judges in New York
