= Randall T. Eng =

American lawyer

Presiding Justice of the New York Supreme Court, Appellate Division, Second Department
- In office October 1, 2012 – 2018
- Appointed by: Andrew Cuomo
- Preceded by: Gail Prudenti

Personal details
- Born: December 16, 1947 (age 78) Canton, China
- Party: Democratic
- Education: State University of New York at Buffalo; St. John's University School of Law

Randall T. Eng (born December 16, 1947) is an American judge who was the presiding justice of the New York Supreme Court, Appellate Division, Second Department. Eng became the first Asian-American to serve as a presiding justice in New York State's history. Born in Canton, China but raised in New York City, Eng attended public school before graduating from the State University of New York at Buffalo and St. John's University School of Law. From 1970 to 2004, Eng was a member of the New York Army National Guard, retiring as a judge advocate with the rank of colonel.

== Early life and education ==
Eng was born on December 16, 1947, in Canton, China, as one of three children to Chinese-American immigrant father who served in the United States Army Air Force in World War II and Cleveland, Ohio born mother who fled the Depression to China from 1933 to the end of WW II. He grew up in Queens, New York, where he attended New York City public schools.

Eng received a B.A. degree in political science from the State University of New York at Buffalo in 1969 and a J.D. degree from St. John's University School of Law in 1972. He served in the New York Army National Guard and as a colonel in the Judge Advocate General's Corps.

== Legal career ==
Eng began his legal career as an assistant district attorney in Queens and held senior positions in the New York City Department of Corrections. He became a judge of the Criminal Court of the City of New York in 1983.

In 1991, he became a judge of the Supreme Court, Queens County courts, and was the administrative judge of the Criminal Term of Queens County Supreme Court starting in March 2007. He was the first Asian-American justice in New York State.

In January 2008 Eng was elevated to the Appellate Division. Governor Andrew M. Cuomo appointed him the presiding justice of the Second Department in 2012, becoming the first Asian American to serve as presiding justice of an Appellate Division.

After retiring from the bench, in January 2018, Eng joined the New York-based law firm Meyer, Suozzi, English & Klein, P.C. as Of Counsel to the Litigation Department, the Appellate Practice and Criminal Defense groups.

== Awards ==
In 2016, Eng gave the commencement address for St. John's Law School and was awarded an honorary degree. In 2016 Eng also won the Daniel K. Inouye Trailblazer Award, NAPABA's highest honor, which recognizes the outstanding achievements, commitment, and leadership of lawyers who have paved the way for the advancement of other Asian Pacific American attorneys.

== See also ==
- List of Asian American jurists
- List of first minority male lawyers and judges in New York
