= John W. Sweeny Jr. =

American judge (1949–2025)

John W. Sweeny, Jr.

Associate Justice of the First Judicial Department
- In office 2004–2019
- Appointed by: George Pataki

Justice on the New York Supreme Court
- In office 1999–2019

Personal details
- Born: May 29, 1949
- Died: October 25, 2025 (aged 76)
- Education: University of Notre Dame; Fordham University School of Law

John W. Sweeny Jr. (May 29, 1949 – October 25, 2025) was an American judge who was an Associate Justice of the New York Appellate Division of the Supreme Court, First Judicial Department.

== Early life and education ==
Sweeny was a 1971 graduate of University of Notre Dame. He received his JD from Fordham University School of Law in 1974.

== Legal career ==
Prior to joining the bench, he worked in private practice. He also served as Law Secretary to State Supreme Court Justices John P. Donohoe and Fred A. Dickinson. He was also an Administrative Assistant District Attorney for Putnam County.

Sweeny subsequently served as a County Court Judge, acting Supreme Court Justice, and New York Supreme Court Justice, from 1987 to 2004. He was designated a Justice for the Appellate Division, First Judicial Department in 2004 by Governor George Pataki and served until his retirement in December 2019.

== Death ==
Sweeny died on October 25, 2025, at the age of 76.
