= Dianne Renwick =

American lawyer

Personal details
- Born: May 20, 1960 (age 65)
- Party: Democratic
- Spouse: Robert Johnson
- Education: Cornell University (BA); Yeshiva University (JD)

Dianne Theresa Renwick is the presiding justice of the New York Appellate Division of the Supreme Court, First Judicial Department. Governor Kathy Hochul appointed her to the position in June 2023 and Renwick became the first African-American woman to serve as Presiding Justice of any Appellate Division in the state.

== Early life and education ==
She is a 1982 graduate of Cornell University and a 1986 graduate of Benjamin N. Cardozo School of Law.

== Legal career ==
Prior to joining the bench, she worked as a staff attorney in various divisions of the Legal Aid Society. She subsequently served on the New York City Civil Court from 1997 to 2001 and was a New York Supreme Court Justice from 2001 to 2008. She was designated as a Justice for the Appellate Division, First Judicial Department in 2008 by Governor David Paterson.

=== People of State NY v Trump ===
Renwick served on the appellate court panel that granted a motion to lower Donald Trump’s bond in his civil case to $175 million. Additionally, this panel afforded Trump a ten-day stay, as well as allowing him and his family to resume business in New York state, which allows Trump to obtain loans from New York financial institutions.

== See also ==
- List of African-American jurists
