= David Friedman (judge) =

American judge

Associate Justice of the First Judicial Department
- Incumbent
- Assumed office March 1999
- Appointed by: George Pataki

Justice on the New York Supreme Court
- In office 1994–1999

Judge on the New York City Civil Court
- In office 1990–1993

Personal details
- Education: Brooklyn College; New York Law School

David Friedman is an associate justice of the New York Appellate Division of the Supreme Court, First Judicial Department.

== Early life and education ==
In 1971, he graduated from Brooklyn College magna cum laude with a degree in mathematics. He was elected Phi Beta Kappa. In 1975, he graduated from New York Law School cum laude. He was an associate editor of the New York Law School Law Review.

== Legal career ==
Prior to joining the bench, he worked as a Law Clerk to Justice Henry Martuscello on the Appellate Division and Justice Nicholas Clemente of the New York Supreme Court, Kings County.

He subsequently served on the New York City Civil Court from 1990 to 1993. He was a New York Supreme Court Justice, from 1994 to 1999. He was designated a Justice for the Appellate Division, First Judicial Department in 1999 by Governor George Pataki.
