= James M. Catterson =

American lawyer

Associate Justice of the First Judicial Department
- In office 2004–2012
- Appointed by: George Pataki

Justice on the New York Supreme Court, 10th Judicial District
- In office 1999–2004

Personal details
- Born: 1958 (age 67–68)
- Education: Colgate University; St. John's University School of Law

James M. Catterson is a former associate justice of the New York Appellate Division of the Supreme Court, First Judicial Department.

== Early life and education ==
He is a 1980 graduate of Colgate University and a 1985 graduate of St. John's University School of Law.

== Legal career ==
Catterson worked for the United States Attorney's Office, Eastern District, between 1986 and 1992 and the Suffolk County Attorney's Office between 1992 and 1998. He was also an adjunct professor for Cardozo Law School in 1995 and for Touro Law School from 1997 to 2002.

Catterson was a justice of the New York State Supreme Court in Suffolk County from 1999 to 2004. In 2004, he was designated a justice for the Appellate Division, First Judicial Department, by Governor George Pataki.

In 2012, Catterson lost his bid for reelection to the Supreme Court in the 10th Judicial District (Nassau and Suffolk Counties). As a result, his term on the Appellate Division automatically expired on December 31, 2012.

Catterson is now a partner at the firm of Pillsbury Winthrop Shaw Pittman LLP located in the New York office.
