= Pando v. Fernandez =

Pando v. Fernandez, 127 Misc.2d 224 (N.Y. Sup. Ct. 1984), is a New York case that arose when Christopher Pando, a deeply religious minor, sought to impose a constructive trust on the proceeds of a winning $2.8 million (21 annual payments; no cash option) ticket that he purchased with Dasyi Fernandez's money. Pando alleged that Mrs. Fernandez agreed to share the prize money equally with him if he prayed to a saint to cause the numbers he picked for her to be the winning numbers. At the time that Pando purchased the ticket, Mrs. Fernandez was 38 and the mother of three children on welfare. Christopher Pando was 16 (too young to buy lottery tickets) and was a friend of her son. Mrs. Fernandez denied that she ever asked Pando to buy the tickets or pick the numbers, and also denied the fact that she offered to share her money with him.

== Holding ==
The New York Supreme Court for New York County, the trial level court in New York, held that Pando had no legally enforceable claim on the proceeds of the winning lottery ticket since it would be impossible for him to prove in court that his faith and prayers brought about a miracle that caused the defendant to win. The court granted summary judgment for the defendants.

== Plaintiff's Claims ==
Pando, through his father and guardian, John Pando, claimed a breach of a partnership agreement. In his complaint, Pando stated two causes of action. The first was that he entered into an oral partnership agreement with Mrs. Fernandez, who believed that Pando was deeply religious and a strong believer in St. Eleggua, and promised that if Pando took her $4 and bought a lottery ticket and selected the numbers, that they would share any of the prize money equally. One of the tickets he bought did in fact win the jackpot, and Pando claims that Mrs. Fernandez's failure to give him 50% of the money constitutes a breach of contract. The second cause of action seeks a declaratory judgment as to the rights of the parties and an imposition of a constructive trust, along with an accounting of the money already paid out and received.

== Defendant's Motion to Dismiss ==
Mrs. Fernandez moved to dismiss on three grounds. First she alleged that the oral agreement was barred by the Statute of Frauds, second that the agreement called upon Pando, a minor, to do an illegal act and is unenforceable, and third that it is impossible to prove in a court of law that the conditions precedent to the effectiveness of the contract had taken place.

== Court's Reasoning ==
Statute of Frauds

As to the defendant's argument that the plaintiff's claim was barred by the Statute of Frauds, the court held that the alleged agreement did not violate the Statute of Frauds, as it was able to be carried out within the one-year period for oral contracts mandated by statute in New York.

Illegal Act

In addressing the defendant's argument that the alleged agreement called upon Pando, who was under 18, to purchase the lottery ticket, it called for the performance of an illegal act so that enforcement of the contract by the courts would be against public policy, the court held that there was "no pervasive requirement that the protection of public morals calls for denial of this contract." The court acknowledged that the law in the state of New York prohibits a person under 18 from purchasing a lottery ticket, but stated also that the law does not prohibit prizes from being paid to people under age 18.

Plaintiff's Ability to Prove Contract Conditions

The court then addressed the question of "whether, in a court of law, plaintiff can prove compliance with the conditions of the contract, as he has set it forth." The court quoted the following statement from the plaintiff's affidavit:

Mrs. Fernandez, knowing that I am religious and a strong believer in St. Eleggua asked me, after noticing that the Lotto prize was several million dollars, whether or not I could get my Saint to win the Lottery. I told her that I did not know, but I would try. She thereupon told me that she would give me $4.00 to select four different tickets and that if my St. Eleggua made my selection of the Lottery numbers win, she would go equal partners with me on the prize.

The court stated that the condition precedent for the sharing of the prize is that Pando's "piety and prayer would cause heavenly intervention so that his selections would win," and then asked the question "[h]ow can plaintiff prove on a trial that 'St. Eleggua made my selection of Lottery numbers win?'"

The court noted that at trial Pando would have the ability to testify to his version of what the defendant said to him, that is that he purchased the tickets, selected the numbers and that he prayed. But the court rhetorically asked "[w]ho is going to provide the proof that his prayers were efficacious, and that the saint caused the numbers to win?"

The court looked into the identity of St. Eleggua and the closest it was able to come was a saint with the Latin name of St. Eligius, the patron saint of goldsmiths, who showered his riches on the poor, and possessed the gifts of miracles and prophecy. The plaintiff was only to share in the lottery winnings if his efforts and prayers to St. Eleggua caused Fernandez to win the money. In essence, the court said, Fernandez wanted a miracle from St. Eleggua arranged by the plaintiff, so the plaintiff has the burden of proving that his prayers caused the miracle to occur.

This presented the court with the problem of determining whether a miracle occurred. The court summarized its problem as follows:

How can we really know what happened? Is a court to engage in the epistemological inquiry as to the acquisition of knowledge and belief through proof or through faith? Faith is the antithesis of proof. It is a belief which is firmly held even though demonstrable proof may be lacking. It is instructive, spiritual, and profound, arrived at not through a coldly logical appraisal of the facts but, in Wordsworth's phrase, by 'a passionate institution.'

The court held that it was impossible to prove in a court of law, which requires tangible proof, that a litigant's faith and prayers brought about a miracle. The court did not discount the fact that perhaps Pando's prayers did bring about a miracle, just that it was impossible to prove in a "modern courtroom."

The court noted that in the past, under Roman law and in Medieval law, there was acceptance of the demonstration of miracles in the courtroom, but distinguished that time from the present because the function of the secular and ecclesiastical courts was not separated in the past, and there was no distinction between "the law of the earth" and "the law of heaven." The court stated that in the modern era "the chasm between the temporal and the spiritual world has become unbridgeable. Theology is to be protected against the law, just as the law is to be protected from theology."

Therefore, the court concludes, there is no way for the plaintiff to prove that his prayer caused Fernandez to have the winning ticket. He cannot prove the existence of saints, the power of prayer, nor divine intervention in temporal affairs.

Constructive Trust

Finally, the court addressed the plaintiff's argument that a constructive trust be imposed. The court decides that because there is no close or confidential relationship between the parties that would call for the imposition of a trust, nor would defendant be unjustly enriched if she retained the full proceeds of her winning ticket that there is no basis for the imposition of a constructive trust.

== Appellate Court Decision ==
In Pando v. Fernandez, 118 A.D.2d 474 (N.Y. App. Div. 1986), the New York Supreme Court, Appellate Division reversed the Supreme Court's decision, denying defendant's motion to dismiss and reinstating the complaint, as well as granting the plaintiff's cross motion to direct defendant to comply with all previously ordered discovery within 30 days of the date of the order.

== Court's Holding and Reasoning ==
The court disagreed with the lower court's holding that there was a cause to dismiss the action for impossibility of proof. The court agreed that saintly intervention is not provable in a court of law, but said it is not evident that the alleged agreement between Pando and Fernandez required such intervention as a condition of enforceability. The court bases this holding on the fact that in at least three places in the record that the lower court did not cite the plaintiff describes the agreement in terms that do not impose a condition of saintly intervention for enforcement. The court says that these versions of the agreement show only that the plaintiff was obligated to use his best efforts to enlist St. Eleggua's help, and that in exchange the defendant would pay for the tickets and split any potential winnings.

The court said that if the defendant bargained for the plaintiff's assistance and she received that assistance, she cannot disown her obligations under the agreement by imposing the additional condition that Pando prove the effectiveness of his prayers. It was possible, according to the court, that the defendant bargained simply for the benefit of the plaintiff's prayers which she felt would enhance her chances of winning the lottery. Therefore, the plaintiff was required to purchase the tickets, select the numbers and pray to the Saint to fulfill his end of the bargain. The court said that none of these actions are impossible to prove in a court of law.

The court concluded that the lower court erred in dismissing the complaint for impossibility of proof it decided the central factual issue of the case, which was what the parties agreed to.

Jury ultimately awarded 1/2 of $2.8 million prize to Pando finding that he had entered into a legally binding contract with Ms. Fernandez.
