= Charles H. Van Brunt =

American lawyer and judge

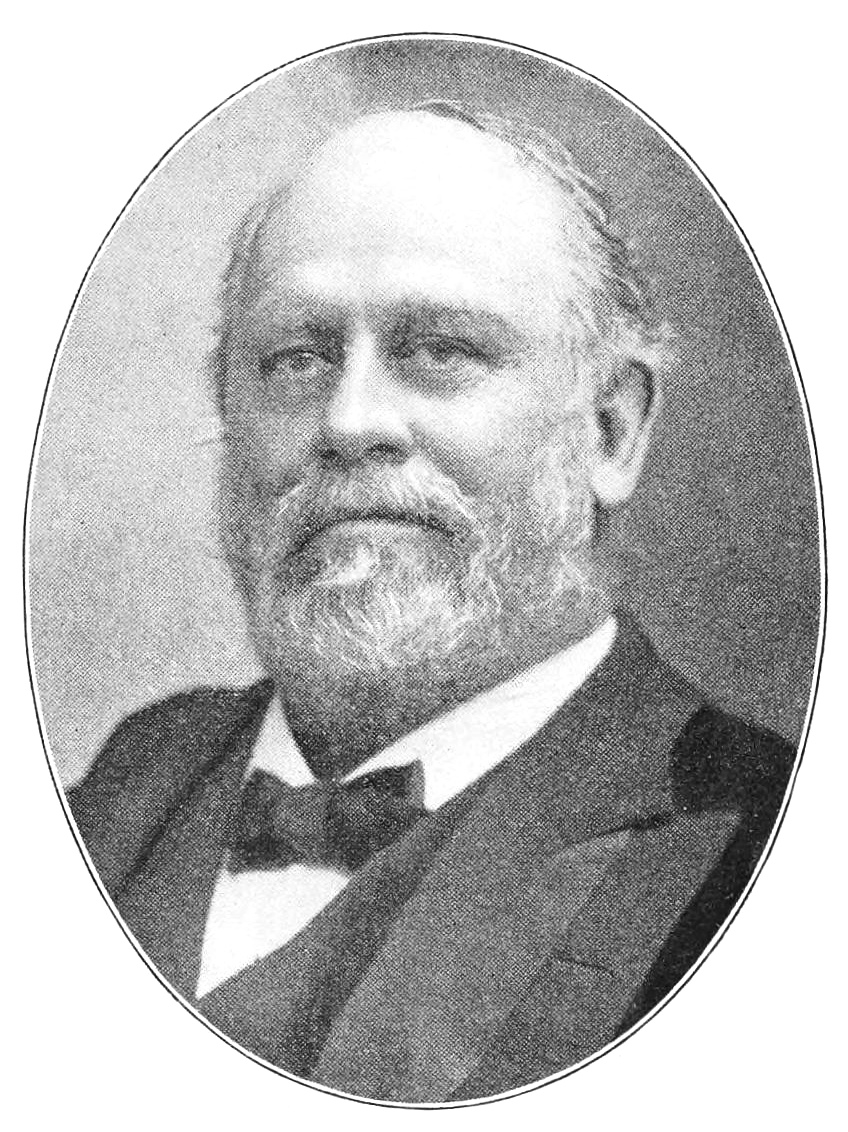
Charles H. Van Brunt

Charles Holmes Van Brunt (December 26, 1835 – May 26, 1905) was an American lawyer and judge from New York.

== Life ==
Van Brunt was born on December 26, 1835, in Bay Ridge, New York, the son of farmer Albert Nicholas Van Brunt and Mary Holmes.

After attending school in Brooklyn, Van Brunt graduated from New York University in 1856. He then studied law in the New York City firm Leonard & Hoffman, ran by Commissioner of Appeals William H. Leonard and future New York governor John T. Hoffman. He was admitted to the bar in 1858 and spent several years with the law firm, first as confidential clerk then as a partner. He served as counsel to the city chamberlain.

In 1869, Van Brunt became a Judge for the Court of Common Pleas for the City and County of New York. He served there until 1883, when he was elected to the New York Supreme Court. He was re-elected to the Supreme Court in 1897. In 1886, he was appointed Presiding Justice of the General Term of the Supreme Court, First Department. In 1896, when the Appellate Division, First Judicial Department was formed, Governor Morton appointed him Presiding Justice of the court. In 1903, he caused controversy when he accepted the position of president of the Windsor Trust Company, which he insisted was an honorary role.

Van Brunt was a member of the Lotos Club, the New York Yacht Club, the Manhattan Club, the Saint Nicholas Society, the American Museum of Natural History, the Metropolitan Museum of Art, the Liederkranz Society. He was married twice. In 1874, he married Jennie E. Bull of Rochester. His children were lawyer Arthur H., Georgie, and Mrs. Andreas.

Van Brunt died from heart disease on the Brooklyn Bridge, while on his way to Brooklyn with his daughter Georgie, on May 26, 1905. He was buried in Green-Wood Cemetery.
