= James Dickson Carr =

American lawyer and assistant district attorney (1868–1920)

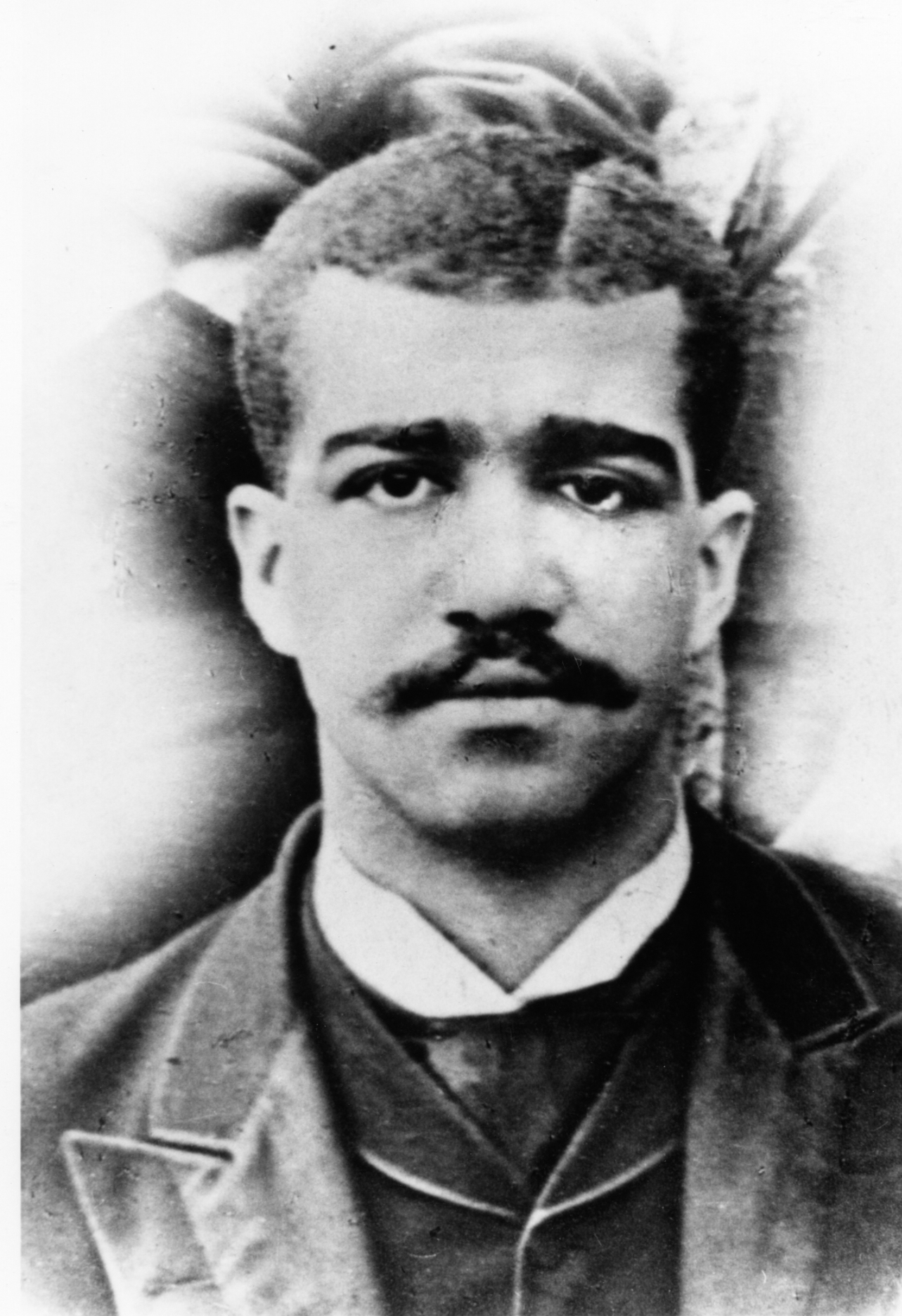
- Carr in 1892
- Born: September 28, 1868; Baltimore, Maryland, U.S.
- Died: July 24, 1920 (aged 51); New York City, New York, U.S.
- Education: Rutgers University, Columbia University Law School
- Occupation(s): lawyer, prosecutor

James Dickson Carr (September 28, 1868 – July 24, 1920) was an American lawyer and the first African American assistant district attorney in New York state history, serving New York County from 1899 to 1901. Carr was also the first African American to graduate from Rutgers University, in 1892.

== Biography ==
Born in Baltimore, Maryland, in 1868, Carr attended public schools in New Haven, Connecticut, and Elizabeth, New Jersey. In 1886 he entered the Rutgers Grammar School, graduating as valedictorian two years later. He received a bachelor's degree from Rutgers College in New Brunswick in 1892, becoming the school's first Black graduate. A talented student, he delivered a commencement speech and joined the Phi Beta Kappa honor society. He boarded with a white student and seems to have faced little overt racism at college. Carr went on to receive a Bachelor of Laws from Columbia Law School, where he was the third Black student in the school's history, and gained admittance to the New York bar in June 1896.

In private practice in New York for three years, Carr became an assistant district attorney for Manhattan in September 1899, appointed by Asa Bird Gardner. He was the first African American to hold this office. He served until April 1901. A longstanding Republican, Carr switched allegiance to the Democratic Party after Republican and former district attorney William M. K. Olcott refused to appoint him on account of his race. Carr helped to establish the United Colored Democrats, an influential Black faction within Tammany Hall. In March 1904, he was appointed as an assistant corporation counsel for the city, overseeing "prosecution of abandonment, aged parent and bastardly proceedings." He was about to be appointed a municipal judge by Mayor John Francis Hylan when he died of heart failure at his home in Harlem in 1920.

Carr married Lillie M. Forrester in New York City on July 7, 1915. The couple had no children.

== Legacy ==
Carr was inducted into the Rutgers Hall of Distinguished Alumni in 1991. In 2017, Rutgers renamed the Kilmer Area Library on its Livingston campus to the James Dickson Carr Library. Rutgers offers a merit-based scholarship called the James Dickson Carr Scholarship for undergraduate students.
