= Corpus Christi Monastery =

Dominican monastery in The Bronx, New York

Coordinates: 40.81566°N 73.89035°W

Corpus Christi Monastery, founded in 1891, is the oldest monastery in the United States of nuns of the Dominican Order. It is an offshoot of Notre-Dame-de-Prouille Monastery, the first monastery of nuns founded by Dominic de Guzman, founder and namesake of the Order, in France in 1206. Dominic saw these first women as partners in the "Holy Preaching" of the friars he soon founded, offering them support by their prayers and sacrifices.

== History ==
Mother Mary of Jesus (born Julia Crooks in New York City), having entered the Order in Oullins, France, founded the Monastery of St. Dominic in Newark, New Jersey, in 1880. Nine years later, she and five other nuns moved to the Morrisania area of New York City (which would soon become the southern portion of the Bronx), at the invitation of Archbishop Michael Augustine Corrigan, who requested the presence of a contemplative community which would have the special purpose of praying for the seminarians and priests of the Archdiocese of New York. The land was purchased at Lafayette Avenue and Baretto Street, and by the time Corpus Christi Monastery was built, there were twenty nuns.
