= Morgan J. O'Brien =

American lawyer

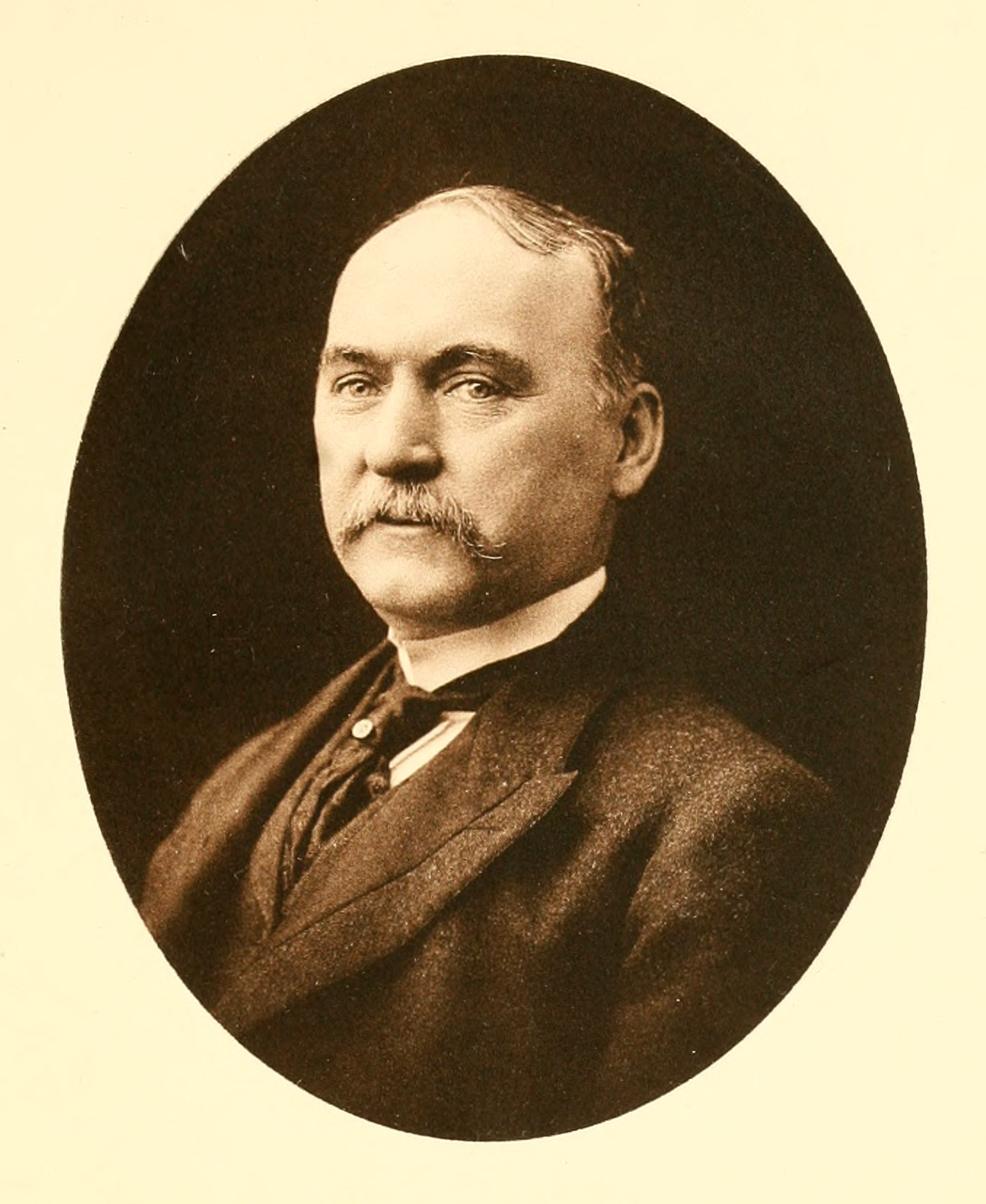
- Born: April 28, 1852; New York, New York
- Died: June 16, 1937 (aged 85); New York, New York
- Resting place: Corpus Christi Monastery
- Education: St. John's College; Columbia Law School
- Occupation: Jurist
- Spouse: Rose M. Crimmins
- Children: 9

Morgan Joseph O'Brien (April 28, 1852 – June 16, 1937) was a lawyer and Judge of the New York Supreme Court and later as member and Presiding Justice of the Appellate Division of the Supreme Court, First Judicial Department from 1896 to 1905. He also served a brief term as Corporation Counsel for New York City in 1887, leaving the position after six months to become a judge.

O'Brien was born in New York City. He was educated in public schools, then at St. John's College, St. Francis Xavier College in New York, and Columbia Law School. He married Rose M. Crimmins on February 5, 1880, and they had nine children, including New York Supreme Court judge Kenneth O'Brien.

He died from pneumonia on June 16, 1937, at his home in Manhattan, and was buried at Corpus Christi Monastery in The Bronx.
