= John Proctor Clarke =

American judge (1856–1932)

John Proctor Clarke (April 23, 1856 – January 12, 1932) was a Presiding Justice, New York Supreme Court, Appellate Division, First Department, an intermediate appellate court in New York State, and an attorney. Clarke was Presiding Justice for a decade, 1916 – 1926, and had served as an Associate Justice since 1905. Clarke was preceded by George L. Ingraham and succeeded by Victor J. Dowling as Presiding Justice. He was born in Florence, Italy to Isaac Edwards Clarke and Mary (Proctor) Clarke, and reared in Larchmont, NY.

Clarke was graduated by Yale University, B.A., 1878, and a classmate of William Howard Taft. He was admitted to the New York Bar in 1880. He had served as an assistant United States Attorney for the Southern District of New York before elevation to the First Department.
