= Luis A. Gonzalez (judge) =

American judge

Presiding Justice of the First Judicial Department
- In office 2009–2015
- Appointed by: David Paterson
- Preceded by: Peter Tom (acting)
- Succeeded by: Peter Tom (acting)

Associate Justice of the First Judicial Department
- In office 2002–2009
- Appointed by: George E. Pataki

Justice on the New York Supreme Court, 12th Judicial District
- In office 1992–2002

Judge on the New York City Civil Court
- In office 1985–1992

General Counsel for the Commonwealth of Puerto Rico
- In office 1978–1980

Personal details
- Born: Manati, Puerto Rico
- Education: Eastern Mennonite University (BA); Columbia Law School (JD)

Luis A. Gonzalez is an American attorney who served as Presiding Justice of the Appellate Division of the Supreme Court, First Judicial Department in New York from 2009–2015.

== Early life and education ==
Gonzalez was born in Manati, Puerto Rico and raised in Hell's Kitchen, Manhattan in a family of seven. His father had been a carpenter in Puerto Rico and worked in a candy factory in New York. His mother was a homemaker. He graduated in 1968 from Eastern Mennonite University with a B.A. in History and Social Science and earned a Juris Doctor from Columbia Law School in 1975.

== Legal career ==
From 1978 to 1980, Gonzalez was General Counsel for the Commonwealth of Puerto Rico from 1978 to 1980. He served on the New York City Civil Court as Housing Court Judge from 1985 to 1986 and a Civil Court Judge from 1987 to 1992. He was a New York Supreme Court Justice, 12th Judicial District, from 1992 to 2002. He was designated a Justice for the Appellate Division, First Judicial Department by Governor George E. Pataki in 2002 and Presiding Justice of that court in 2009 by Governor David Paterson. He was the first person of Puerto Rican descent to hold the position of Presiding Justice.

== See also ==
- List of Hispanic and Latino American jurists

Legal offices
| Preceded by Peter Tom (acting) | Presiding Justice of the First Judicial Department; 2009–2015 | Succeeded by Peter Tom (acting) |
