= Louis Capozzoli =

American politician

Louis Joseph Capozzoli
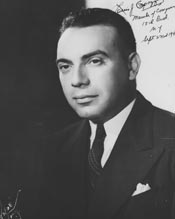

Member of the U.S. House of Representatives from New York's 13th district
- In office January 3, 1941 – January 3, 1945
- Preceded by: Christopher D. Sullivan
- Succeeded by: Donald L. O'Toole

Member of the New York State Assembly from the New York County, 2nd district
- In office January 1, 1939 – December 31, 1940
- Preceded by: Nicholas A. Rossi
- Succeeded by: Louis DeSalvio

Personal details
- Born: March 6, 1901 Cosenza, Italy
- Died: October 8, 1982 (aged 81) New York City, New York, U.S.
- Party: Democratic Party
- Spouse: Adele Valli Capozzoli
- Education: Fordham University School of Law
- Occupation: Attorney, Judge

Louis Joseph Capozzoli (March 6, 1901 – October 8, 1982) was an American lawyer and politician who served two terms as a United States representative from New York from 1941 to 1945.

== Biography ==
Born in Cosenza, Italy, he emigrated to the United States in 1906 and attended public schools in New York City. In 1922 he graduated from the law department of Fordham University and in 1923 was admitted to the bar, commencing practice in New York City. He was an assistant district attorney of New York County from 1930 to 1937; and a member of the New York State Assembly (New York Co., 2nd D.) in 1939 and 1940.

=== Congress ===
Capozzoli was elected as a Democrat to the 77th and 78th United States Congresses, holding office from January 3, 1941, to January 3, 1945.

=== Later career ===
Afterwards, he resumed the practice of law.

In 1946, he was elected a justice of the New York City Court and served from 1947 to 1950. He was elected to the Court of General Sessions in 1950, and served until January 1957; he was then appointed and served as a judge of the New York Supreme Court from January 21, 1957, to December 31, 1957. He was elected to the New York Supreme Court for a fourteen-year term and was appointed as an associate justice of the Appellate Division (1st Dept.) on April 29, 1966.

=== Retirement and death ===
He retired from the bench at the end of 1977.

He died on October 8, 1982, in New York City.

New York State Assembly
Preceded by Nicholas A. Rossi	New York State Assembly; New York County, 2nd District; 1939–1940	Succeeded by Louis F. DeSalvio
U.S. House of Representatives
Preceded by Christopher D. Sullivan	Member of the U.S. House of Representatives from New York's 13th congressional district 1941–1945	Succeeded by Donald L. O'Toole
