= New York County Lawyers' Association =

Bar association in New York City

- Formation: 1908
- Type: Legal society
- Headquarters: New York, NY
- Location: United States
- President: Stephen C. Lessard
- Website: Official website

The New York County Lawyers Association (NYCLA) is a bar association located in New York City.

The New York County Lawyers Association was founded in 1908 because the existing bar association excluded some lawyers from membership due to their race, gender, ethnicity or religion. A meeting held in Carnegie Hall in 1907 determined to create a "democratic bar association" and 143 attorneys incorporated the NYCLA a few months later. Throughout its history, NYCLA has included all who wish to join and their focus has been the active pursuit of legal system reform.

The association is located at the New York County Lawyers Association Building in Lower Manhattan. It provides opinions on candidates for judicial office, organizes forums and investigations and expresses the associations opinions on matters concerning the legal system in New York and jurisprudence in general, and provides Continuing Legal Education (CLE) for attorneys in New York and New Jersey. NYCLA creates Task Forces and publishes reports highlighting issues of special concern to the public and legal community. NYCLA is currently certified as an accredited provider of continuing legal education for both New York and New Jersey.

NYCLA is a bar association organized for charitable and educational purposes. Its objectives are to advance the science of jurisprudence, and to promote the administration of justice and reforms in the law. They elevate the standards of integrity, honor and courtesy in the legal profession and foster the spirit of collegiality among members of the Association and throughout the bar. A main focus is to apply its knowledge and experience in the field of law to the promotion of the public good, and to arrange for the provision by its members of free legal services for indigent, low income and other persons in need. Throughout history they have encouraged diversity throughout the legal profession and ensured access to justice for all. They have always maintained high ethical standards for the bench and bar; and have promoted high quality legal education and other resources for law students and lawyers.

NYCLA has joint membership programs with seven minority bar associations: The Asian-American Bar Association of New York, Indian-American Lawyers' Association, Korean-American Lawyers' Association of Greater New York, Lesbian, Gay, Bisexual and Transgender Law Association of New York, Metropolitan Black Bar Association, Puerto Rican Bar Association and South Asian Bar Association of New York.

== History ==
- 1907 – A group of lawyers gathered in Carnegie Hall to address the prospect of forming a bar group where politics were not obstacles to inclusion. The bar leaders who met were determined to create, in the words of Joseph Hodges Choate (who would become president of NYCLA in 1912), "the great democratic bar association of the City [where] any attorney who had met the rigid standards set up by law for admission to the bar should, by virtue of that circumstance, be eligible for admission."
- 1908 – Attorneys or counsellors of the Supreme Court of the State of New York in active practice officially incorporated the New York County Lawyers Association. It initially included both the borough of Manhattan and the borough of the Bronx.
- 1929 – Construction begins on the Home of Law, at 14 Vesey Street, a building designed by renowned architect Cass Gilbert.
- 1930 – 14 Vesey Street building is dedicated as the Home of Law.
- 1943 – NYCLA successfully urges the American Bar Association to declare its membership open to all lawyers without regard to race.
- 1946 – NYCLA works with other local bar associations to establish legal referral services to provide referrals to attorneys, many of whom were returning from serving in World War II.
- 1949 – NYCLA sponsors a conference on civil rights in the post-World War II era.
- 1952 – NYCLA publishes a groundbreaking report on public apathy toward delinquent children. The report brought wide acclaim and won the endorsement of Mayor Robert F. Wagner.
- 1956 – At NYCLA's urging, the American Bar Association removes questions about race from its membership application.
- 1972 – The Women's Rights Committee of NYCLA is established to address all legal concerns that affect women.
- 1976 – NYCLA launches the New York County Legal Services Corporation, the first bar association-sponsored prepaid legal services plan in the country, to help small businesses and middle-income families find lawyers and assure the lawyers' availability for a reasonable fee.
- 1989 – Consistent with its view that pro bono service should be voluntary, NYCLA organizes a conference of county bar associations from around the state to coordinate their unanimous opposition to Chief Judge Wachtler's proposal to require all lawyers to render 40 hours of civil pro bono service every two years.
- 1995 – NYCLA inducts its first female president, Rosalind Fink.
- 1997 – NYCLA's proposal to increase fees for attorneys to improve the quality of defense afforded to indigent defendants wins the endorsement of bar associations across the state.
- 2001 – NYCLA organizes efforts to help those affected by the September 11th attacks, including relief efforts like the Death Certificate Project to help affected families obtain documentation for insurance and other benefits.
- 2003 – NYCLA issues a report urging that the practice of videotaping custodial interrogations be mandated in New York State. The report is approved by the New York State Bar Association and the American Bar Association's House of Delegates the following year.
- 2006 – NYCLA establishes a Task Force to develop a plan of action to increase the Housing Court's effectiveness in administering justice for the people of New York City. The Task Force subsequently examines the statutory framework of the Housing Court and releases several reports with suggestions.
- 2007 – NYCLA inducts its first African American president, Catherine Christian.
- 2008 – NYCLA establishes a Task Force on the Family Court to analyze proceedings from two conferences that the NYCLA Justice Center convened on the Family Court and develops a reform agenda to reassess the way in which family courts address the central needs of children and families who appear in these courts.
- 2011-2014 – The Task Force on Judicial Budget Cuts, established in 2011, addresses the effects of continuing budget cuts, including sequestration, on the administration of justice in the federal courts of New York, including the United States District Courts for the Southern District and the Eastern District of New York.

== Committees, task forces & public policy ==
The New York County Lawyers Association plays an active role in the development of legal and public policy, including spearheading efforts to support diversity in the legal profession with its Summer Minority Judicial Internship Programs which provides stipends to law students of color who are placed as interns with federal and state court judges, as well as pioneering some of the most far-reaching and tangible reforms in American jurisprudence. NYCLA's standing Committees and Sections continue to expand to cover the changing and growing interests of public sector and the legal community. Standing Committees and Sections include the following:

- Admiralty and maritime law
- Alternative dispute resolution
- Animal law
- Anti-trust and trade regulations
- Appellate courts
- Art law
- Asian practice
- Banking
- Bankruptcy law
- Civil court practice section
- Civil rights and liberties
- Construction law
- Corporation law
- Criminal justice section
- Cyberspace law
- Education law
- Elder law
- Election law
- Entertainment intellectual property and sports law
- Environmental law
- Estates trust section
- Family court and child welfare
- Federal courts
- Foreign and international law
- Futures and derivatives
- Health law
- Immigration and nationality
- In-house/outside counsel
- Insurance law
- Judicial section
- Labor relations and employment law
- Law and literature
- Law-related education
- Lesbian/gay/bisexual/transgender issues
- Matrimonial law section
- Minorities and the law
- Municipal affairs
- Non-profit organizations
- Professional discipline
- Professional ethics
- Real property sections
- Securities & exchanges
- Senior lawyers
- Solo and small firm practice
- Supreme court
- Taxation
- Tort law
- Women's rights
- Young lawyers' section

=== Task forces ===
- NYCLA Task Force on Judicial Budget Cuts
- NYCLA Task Force on the Family Court
- NYCLA Task Force on Professionalism
- NYCLA Task Force on Judicial Section
- NYC Criminal Courts Task Force
- NYCLA Task force on Corporate Responsibility
- NYCLA Task Force on Ethics Reform
- NYCLA Task Force on Housing Courts
- NYCLA Task Force on Same-Sex Marriage
- NYCLA Task Force on Campaign Finance Reform
- NYCLA Task Force to Increase Diversity in the Legal Profession
- NYCLA Task Force on Meeting the Challenge ("50 hour rule")

== Publications ==
- NYCLA's newspaper, New York County Lawyer, is published ten times per year – once each month except for August and December – in both print and online versions. Its articles focus on emerging trends and "hot" topics in the legal industry, and are authored by a mix of NYCLA members and outside experts.
- Attorneys' Guide to Civil Practice in the New York Supreme Court which provides information designed to help practitioners navigate the complexities of the New York County Supreme Court.
- Commercial Litigation in New York State Courts is a multi-volume treatise published as a joint venture between NYCLA and Thomson Reuters Westlaw. It includes substantive chapters on various commercial subjects as well as detailed discussions of procedure.
- Committee Reports used to analyze and report on pending legislation and proposed rule making by administrative agencies and the courts.
- Construction Law Journal which includes articles on recent trends and developments in that field.
- New York City Criminal Courts Manual which is designed as a guide to practice in the New York City criminal courts. It has information about basic criminal law (including statutory and case law citations) and court procedures.
- The New York Rules of Professional Conduct which are the ethical rules governing all attorneys licensed to practice in New York.

== Pro bono work ==
On September 14, 2012, the New York State Court of Appeals adopted a new rule requiring applicants for admission to the New York State bar to perform 50 hours of pro bono services.

== Annual events ==
- Charles Evans Hughes Memorial Lecture: The Hughes Lecture Series was instituted by the NYCLA in 1948 to pay tribute to Charles Evans Hughes, whose career had a substantial impact on the evolution of law and public policy.
- Ida B. Wells-Barnett Award Reception: In honor of one of the first African American women to run for public office in the United States.
- Law Day Luncheon: Honors the tradition of upholding the rule of law, and recognizes service to the advancement of the law.
- Luncheon Honoring Federal Courts in NYC: Honors the federal courts in New York City and those judges of the federal courts who have brought honor and exhibited exemplary service.
- Annual Dinner: Features a keynote speaker addressing compelling issues of the day, as well as the presentation of annual awards to judges and lawyers who have been influential in making equal justice under the law a reality.

== Awards and honors ==
- The Jack Newton Lerner Award for excellence in continuing legal education.
- The Capozzoli Gavel Award, named in honor of Justice Louis J. Capozzoli is awarded to a distinguished Judge or attorney who embodies the highest ideals of the profession at NYCLA's annual Law Day Luncheon.
- The Ida B. Wells-Barnett Justice Award is named for one of the first African-American women to run for public office in the United States.
- Public Service Awards and Criminal Justice Stipends honors lawyers in the public sector who have distinguished themselves as innovators, role models, and solvers of complex legal problems.
- The Law & Literature Award is given to authors, who through their writings of fiction, non-fiction or poetry have enhanced the public's understanding of the legal profession, legal systems, or legal issues.
- The Edith I. Spivack Award honors the creation of the New York County Lawyer's Association's Women's Rights Committee.
- The Edward Weinfeld Award for Distinguished Contributions to the Administration of Justice is presented by NYCLA's Federal Courts Committee each October to a judge who embodies the fairness and dedication to the judiciary exemplified by Judge Edward Weinfeld.
- The William Nelson Cromwell Award honors the unselfish service to the profession and the community.
- The Boris Kostelanetz President's Medal is presented annually to an individual who has given significant service to NYCLA.
- The Diversity Award is given each year at NYCLA's Annual Dinner to recognize an individual's leadership, efforts and achievements in increasing diversity in the legal profession.

== Leadership and governance ==
NYCLA leadership consists of our officers, which include (1). President, who acts as CEO; (2). President-Elect, who is a member of all committees and sections, and who fills in for the President at meetings in his or her absence; (3). Vice President, who is delegated power by the President or the NYCLA Board; (4). Secretary of the Board, who keeps records of the Association and its proceedings, among other duties; and (5). Treasurer, who, subject to the control of the Board of Directors, is in general charge of Association funds.

NYCLA Presidents

- John F. Dillon: 1908-1909
- Alton B. Parker: 1909-1912
- Joseph H. Choate: 1912-1914
- Thomas H. Hubbard: 1914-1915
- Edgar M. Cullen: 1915-1916
- Henry A. Gildersleeve: 1916-1917
- Morgan J. O'Brien: 1917-1919
- Charles E. Hughes: 1919-1921
- Charles Strauss: 1921-1923
- James A. O'Gorman: 1923-1925
- Samuel Seabury: 1925-1927
- William Nelson Cromwell: 1927-1930
- Henry W. Taft: 1930-1932
- Charles A. Boston: 1932-1934
- Robert C. Morris: 1934-1936
- Charles E. Hughes Jr.: 1936-1938
- George Z. Medalie: 1938-1940
- Robert Marsh: 1940-1942
- William Dean Embree: 1942-1944
- Ignatius M. Wilkinson: 1944-1946
- Joseph M. Proskauer: 1946-1948
- I. Howard Lehman: 1948-1950
- John F. Brosnan: 1950-1952
- Edwin M. Otterbourg: 1952-1954
- William J. O'Shea: 1954-1956
- Ben A. Matthews: 1956-1958
- Arthur H. Schwartz: 1958-1960
- Francis S. Bensel: 1960-1962
- Eugene A. Sherpick: 1962-1963
- Leo Gottlieb: 1963-1965
- Mark F. Hughes: 1965-1967
- James V. Hayes: 1967-1969
- Boris Kostelanetz: 1969-1971
- Thomas Kiernan: 1971-1973
- Henry N. Ess III: 1973-1975
- Wilbur H. Friedman: 1975-1977
- Lawrence X. Cusack: 1977-1979
- Hon. Harold Baer Jr.: 1979-1981
- James W. Lamberton: 1981-1982
- Denis McInerney: 1982-1984
- Daniel C. Draper: 1984-1986
- Kenneth J. Bialkin: 1986-1988
- Eugene P. Souther: 1988-1990
- Arthur Norman Field: 1990-1992
- Robert L. Haig: 1992-1994
- Casimir C. Patrick II: 1994-1995
- Klaus Eppler: 1995-1996
- John J. Kenney: 1996-1997
- Rosalind S. Fink: 1997-1998
- Stephen D. Hoffman: 1998-2000
- Craig A. Landy: 2000-2002
- Michael Miller: 2002-2004
- Norman L. Reimer: 2004-2006
- Edwin David Robertson: 2006-2007
- Catherine A. Christian: 2007-2008
- Ann B. Lesk: 2008-2010
- James B. Kobak Jr: 2010-2011
- Stewart D. Aaron: 2011-2013
- Barbara Moses: 2013-2014
- Lewis Tesser: 2014-2015
- Carol A. Sigmond: 2015 - 2017
- Michael J. McNamara: 2017 - 2019
- Stephen C. Lessard: 2019 - 2021
- Vincent Ted Chang: 2021 - 2023
- Adrienne B. Koch: 2023 - 2025
- Richard P. Swanson: 2025
