= List of New York University School of Law alumni =

New York University School of Law has produced many influential alumni in law, government, business, academia, and society. Following is a list of notable NYU Law School alumni.

== Academia ==
Name	Degree	Notability	References
Michael Broyde	J.D. 1988	Professor of law and academic director of the Law and Religion Program at Emory University School of Law.	
John C. Coffee	LLM, 1976	Adolf A. Berle Professor at Columbia Law School	
Yoram Dinstein	J.D.	President of Tel Aviv University	
Deborah Epstein	J.D. 1988	Professor at Georgetown Law School	
Richard Joel	J.D. 1975	President, Yeshiva University	
Roberta Karmel	LLB, 1962	Centennial Professor of Law at Brooklyn Law School; first female commissioner of the SEC	
Raymond Lisle	J.D. 1936	Dean of the Brooklyn Law School	
Bridget McCormack	J.D. 1991	Professor University of Michigan Law School and founder and co-director of its Michigan Innocence Clinic	
Troy A. McKenzie	J.D. 2000	Dean of New York University School of Law	
James J. Reynolds	J.D.	Assistant superintendent, New York City Board of Education	
Abbe Smith	J.D. 1982	Professor at Georgetown University Law Center	

== Advocacy and nonprofit ==
Name	Degree	Notability	References
Debo Adegbile	J.D. 1994	Director of litigation of NAACP Legal Defense Fund	
Christine (Ross) Barker	LL.M.	Canadian pacifist and suffragist; first female chartered public accountant in the United States	
Crystal Eastman	J.D. 1907	Co-founder and co-editor of The Liberator; co-founder of the Women's International League for Peace and Freedom and American Civil Liberties Union	
Abraham Foxman	J.D. 1982	Chairman and national director of the Anti-Defamation League	
Jo Freeman	J.D. 1965	Feminist and political scientist; early organizer of the women's liberation movement	
Sherrilyn Ifill	J.D. 1987	President and director-counsel of NAACP Legal Defense Fund	
Helene L. Kaplan	J.D. 1967	Former chairman of the Carnegie Corporation of New York	

== Business ==
Name	Degree	Notability	References
John J. Creedon	J.D. 1957	Former CEO and chairman of MetLife	
Michael Karlan	LL.M. 1993	Founder of Professionals in the City	
Herb Kelleher	LL.B. 1955	CEO and founder of Southwest Airlines	
Robert A. Kindler	J.D. 1980	Vice chairman of Morgan Stanley	
Paul Moore Sr.	LL.B. 1911	Founder of Republic Aviation	
Barry Salzberg	LL.M.	CEO of Deloitte	
Stuart Subotnick	J.D.	President of Metromedia Company, Inc.	

== Entertainment ==
Name	Degree	Notability	References
Matthew Ahn	J.D. 2014	Holds the Guinness World Record for fastest time to travel to all New York City Subway stations	
Cherry Chevapravatdumrong	J.D.	Writer and co-producer of Family Guy	
Nancy Grace	LL.M.	Court TV host	
Sally Kohn	J.D. 2002	Political commentator and contributor to Fox News	
Kenny Lucas	Non-degreed	Academy Award-nominated writer and producer of Judas and the Black Messiah	
Demetri Martin	Non-degreed	Comedian known for Important Things with Demetri Martin and The Daily Show	
Gerald Schoenfeld	LL.B. 1949	Chairman of The Shubert Organization from 1972 to 2008	

== Judiciary ==
Name	Degree	Notability	References
Adam B. Abelson	J.D. 2010	Judge, U.S. District Court, District of Maryland	
G. Steven Agee	LL.M.	Judge, U.S. Court of Appeals, Fourth Circuit	
Florence E. Allen	LL.B. 1913	Judge, U.S. Court of Appeals, Sixth Circuit	
Nancy Atlas	J.D. 1974	Judge, U.S. District Court, Southern District of Texas	
Richard M. Berman	J.D. 1967	Judge, U.S. District Court, Southern District of New York	
J. Sidney Bernstein	LL.B. 1900	Judge, New York Supreme Court	
Pasco Bowman II	J.D. 1958	Judge, U.S. Court of Appeals, Eighth Circuit	
Thomas Buergenthal	J.D. 1960	Judge, International Court of Justice	
Victoria Calvert	J.D. 2006	Judge, U.S. District Court, Northern District of Georgia	
Raymond T. Chen	J.D. 1994	Judge, U.S. Court of Appeals, Federal Circuit	
Albert Diaz	J.D. 1988	Judge, U.S. Court of Appeals, Fourth Circuit	
Todd E. Edelman	J.D. 1994	Judge, Superior Court, District of Columbia	
Nabil Elaraby	LL.M. 1969; J.S.D. 1971	Judge, International Court of Justice	
Katherine B. Forrest	J.D. 1990	Judge, U.S. District Court, Southern District of New York	
Cynthia Holcomb Hall	LL.M. 1960	Judge, U.S. Court of Appeals, Ninth Circuit	
Janet C. Hall	J.D. 1973	Chief judge, U.S. District Court, District of Connecticut	
David Hittner	J.D. 1964	Judge, U.S. District Court, Southern District of Texas	
Dennis G. Jacobs	J.D. 1973	Judge, U.S. Court of Appeals, Second Circuit	
Judith Kaye	LL.B. 1958	Chief judge, New York Court of Appeals	
Samuel D. Levy	LL. B., 1880	Judge, New York Domestic Relations Court	
Tana Lin	J.D. 1991	Judge, U.S. District Court, Western District of Washington	
Sheryl Lipman	J.D. 1987	United States District Court for the Western District of Tennessee	
Raymond Lohier	J.D. 1991	Judge, U.S. Court of Appeals, Second Circuit	
Wauhope Lynn	1882	Justice, New York Municipal Court	
Bridget McCormack	J.D. 1991	Associate justice, Michigan Supreme Court	
Joseph M. McLaughlin	LL.M. 1964	Judge, U.S. Court of Appeals, Second Circuit	
Roy W. McLeese III	J.D. 1985	Associate Judge, District of Columbia Court of Appeals	
Kevin McNulty	J.D. 1983	Judge, U.S. District Court, District of New Jersey	
Katherine M. Menendez	J.D. 1997	Judge, U.S. District Court, District of Minnesota	
Natasha C. Merle	J.D. 2008	Judge, U.S. District Court, Eastern District of New York	
M. Blane Michael	J.D. 1968	Judge, U.S. Court of Appeals, Fourth Circuit	
Nina Morrison	J.D. 1998	Judge, U.S. District Court, Eastern District of New York	
Lynn Nakamoto	J.D. 1985	Associate justice, Oregon Supreme Court	
Pauline Newman	LL.B. 1958	Judge, U.S. Court of Appeals, Federal Circuit	
Alan Eugene Norris	LL.B. 1960	Judge, U.S. Court of Appeals, Sixth Circuit	
Jinsook Ohta	J.D. 2001	Judge, U.S. District Court, Southern District of California	
Solomon Oliver Jr.	J.D. 1972	Chief judge, U.S. District Court, Northern District of Ohio	
M. Warley Platzek	LL.B. 1876	Judge, New York Supreme Court	
Leo F. Rayfiel	LL.B. 1908	Judge, U.S. District Court, Eastern District of New York	
Jennifer H. Rearden	J.D. 1996	Judge, U.S. District Court, Southern District of New York	
Jenny Rivera	J.D. 1985	Associate Judge, New York Court of Appeals	
Burton B. Roberts	1949	Judge who inspired the character of Myron Kovitsky in Tom Wolfe's The Bonfire of the Vanities	
Jennifer L. Rochon	J.D. 1997	Judge, U.S. District Court, Southern District of New York	
Berle M. Schiller	J.D. 1968	Judge, U.S. District Court, Eastern District of Pennsylvania	
Lorna G. Schofield	J.D. 1981	Judge, U.S. District Court, Southern District of New York	
Margaret Strickland	J.D. 2006	Judge, U.S. District Court, District of New Mexico	
Theodore Trautwein	1953	New Jersey Superior Court, Appellate Division judge known for the"Dr. X" trial of Mario Jascalevich	
Eric N. Vitaliano	J.D. 1971	Judge, U.S. District Court, Eastern District of New York	

== Law ==
Name	Degree	Notability	References
David Boies	LL.M. 1967	Lawyer known for United States v. Microsoft, Bush v. Gore	
Emilie Bullowa	1900	Lawyer and president of the National Association of Women Lawyers	
Fanny Hallock Carpenter	1896	Lawyer; first woman to win a case before the New York Court of Appeals	
Evan Chesler	J.D. 1975	Lawyer and chairman of Cravath, Swaine & Moore law firm	
Amal Clooney	LL.M. 2001	Barrister at Doughty Street Chambers in London, UK	
Bernard G. Ehrlich	LL.B. 1951	National Guard major general, convicted in Wedtech scandal	
Bob Ferguson	J.D.	Washington state attorney general	
Tsion Gurmu	J.D.2015	Legal director of the Black Alliance for Just Immigration	
Martin Lipton	J.D. 1955	Founding partner of Wachtell, Lipton, Rosen & Katz who invented the "poison pill"	
Mimi Rocah	J.D. 1997	District attorney of Westchester County	
Joseph Russoniello	J.D. 1966	U.S. attorney for the Northern District of California	
M. Patricia Smith	J.D.	Solicitor for the United States Department of Labor	
Joel Steinberg	Non-degreed	Attorney convicted of manslaughter	
Charles Tetzlaff	LLM, 1964	United States attorney for the District of Vermont, 1993–2001	
Benjamin B. Wagner	J.D.	United States attorney for the Eastern District of California	
Phil Weiser	J.D. 1994	Attorney general of Colorado	

== Literature and journalism ==
Name	Degree	Notability	References
Deborah Coonts	LL.M. 2006	Romantic mystery novelist	
Crystal Eastman	J.D. 1907	Co-founder and co-editor of The Liberator; co-founder of the Women's International League for Peace and Freedom and American Civil Liberties Union	
Philip Friedman	J.D. 1969	Author of bestselling nonfiction books	
Michael Gartner	J.D. 1972	Journalist who won the 2001 Pulitzer Prize for Editorial Writing	
John F. Kennedy Jr.	J.D. 1989	Publisher and founder of George magazine, son of President John F. Kennedy	
Shana Knizhnik	J.D. 2015	Bestselling nonfiction author	
Francis M. Nevins	J.D. 1967	Edgar Award-winning mystery writer, biographer, film historian	
Charles Reznikoff	LL.B. 1916	Objectivist poet	

== Politics and government ==
Name	Degree	Notability	References
Lamar Alexander	J.D. 1965	United States Senate	
William Bernard Barry	LL.B. 1925	United States House of Representatives	
Carol Bellamy	J.D. 1968	Director of the Peace Corps, executive director of the United Nations Children's Fund, executive director of UNICEF, and president of the New York City Council	
Rudy Boschwitz	J.D. 1953	United States Senate	
Charles Robin Britt	LL.M. 1976	United States House of Representatives	
Roberto de Oliveira Campos	Graduate work	Brazilian legislator and ambassador to the United States and United Kingdom	
Peter Angelo Cavicchia	LL.B. 1908	United States House of Representatives (1931–1937)	
Maurice Connolly	LL.B. 1898	United States House of Representatives	
Clay Constantinou	LL.M. 1986	U.S. ambassador to Luxembourg	
Irwin Delmore Davidson	LL.B. 1928	United States House of Representatives	
Diana DeGette	J.D. 1982	United States House of Representatives	
Fred J. Eckert	Non-degreed	United States House of Representatives and U.S. ambassador	
Edward Irving Edwards	LL.B.	United States Senate (1923–1929), governor of New Jersey	
Mohamed ElBaradei	LL.M. 1971; J.S.D. 1974	Vice president of Egypt and director general of the International Atomic Energy Agency	
Smith Ely	LL.B. 1846	United States House of Representatives	
Guillermo Endara	LL.M. 1963	President of Panama	
Leonard Farbstein	LL.B. 1924	United States House of Representatives (1957–1971)	
Hamilton Fish IV	LL.B. 1957	United States House of Representatives (1969–1995)	
Louis Freeh	LL.M. 1984	Director of the Federal Bureau of Investigation (1993–2001)	
Jacob Augustus Geissenhainer	LL.B. 1862	United States House of Representatives	
Rudy Giuliani	J.D. 1968	Mayor of New York City (1994–2001); presidential candidate (2008)	
Nathan Goff Jr.	LL.B. 1866	United States Senate	
Jacob Goldstein	LL.B. 1910	New York State Assembly (1916–1917)	
Anthony Jerome Griffin	LL.B. 1892	United States House of Representatives (1918–1935)	
Frank Joseph Guarini	J.D. 1950, LL.M. 1955	United States House of Representatives (1979–1993)	
Vanita Gupta	J.D. 2001	United States associate attorney general (2021–2024)	
Jacob Javits	LL.B. 1926	United States Senate	
Hakeem Jeffries	J.D. 1997	House minority leader, United States House of Representatives	
Mitchell Jenkins	LL.B. 1926	United States House of Representatives	
Lazarus Joseph	LLB, 1911	New York state senator and New York City comptroller	
Edward Aloysius Kenney	LL.B. 1908	United States House of Representatives (1933–1938)	
Arthur George Klein	LL.B. 1926	United States House of Representatives (1946–1956)	
Edward I. Koch	LL.B. 1948	United States House of Representatives (1969–1977) and mayor of New York City (1978–1989)	
Fiorello La Guardia	LL.B. 1908	United States House of Representatives (1916–1934) and mayor of New York City (1934–1945)	
Jon Leibowitz	J.D. 1984	Chairman of the Federal Trade Commission	
Jefferson Monroe Levy	LL.B. 1873	United States House of Representatives (1911–1915)	
Stanley Nelson Lundine	LL.B. 1964	United States House of Representatives (1976–1987)	
Ma Ying-Jeou	LL.M. 1976	President of the Republic of China (Taiwan)	
John MacCrate	LL.B. 1906	United States House of Representatives	
Allan Langdon McDermott	LL.B. 1877	United States House of Representatives (1900–1907)	
Thomas Joseph Meskill	LL.B. 1955	United States House of Representatives	
James Edward Murray	J.D. 1900	United States Senate (1934–1961)	
Yaakov Neeman	LL.M. J.S.D.	Finance Minister of Israel and chair of the Neeman Committee	
Edward T. O'Connor, Jr.	LL.M.	New Jersey state senator	
Tasker Lowndes Oddie	LL.B. 1895	United States Senate (1921–1933)	
James Aloysius O'Gorman	J.D. 1887	United States Senate (1911–1917)	
Denis O'Leary	LL.B. 1890	United States House of Representatives	
Bob Packwood	J.D. 1957	United States Senate (1969–1995)	
Nathan David Perlman	LL.B. 1907	United States House of Representatives (1920–1927)	
Scott Peters	J.D. 1984	United States House of Representatives	
Anning Smith Prall	LL.B:, 1908	United States House of Representatives (1923–1935)	
Benjamin Rabin	LL.B. 1917	United States House of Representatives	
Leo Frederick Rayfiel	LL.B. 1908	United States House of Representatives	
Charles P. Rettig	LL.M. 1982	Commissioner of Internal Revenue	
Elihu Root	LL.B. 1867	Secretary of War (1899–1903), secretary of state (1905–1909), and United States Senate (1912)	
Benjamin Stanley Rosenthal	LL.M. 1952	United States House of Representatives (1962–1983)	
Thomas P. Salmon	LL.M. 1958	Governor of Vermont	
Daniel Edgar Sickles	LL.B. 1846	United States House of Representatives	
Isaac Siegel	LL.B. 1901	United States House of Representatives	
Vaughn Stewart	J.D. 2014	Maryland House of Delegates	
Louis W. Stotesbury	LL.B., 1892	New York City attorney, adjutant general of New York	
Maria Gracia Pulido Tan	LL.M. 1987	Chairperson of the Philippine Commission on Audit and undersecretary of the Department of Finance (Philippines)	
Ludwig Teller	LL.B. 1935	United States House of Representatives (1957–1961)	
Herbert Tenzer	LL.B. 1927	United States House of Representatives	
Samuel J. Tilden	LL.B. 1841	United States Senate and governor of New York	
Martha M. Walz	J.D. 1987	Massachusetts House of Representatives	
Elijah Ward	LL.B. 1943	United States House of Representatives	

== Sports ==
Name	Degree	Notability	References
Norman C. Armitage	LL.M. 1937, J.D. 1939	Olympic bronze medalist for fencing	
Gary Bettman	J.D. 1977	National Hockey League commissioner	
Robert Blum		Olympic fencer	
Howard Cosell	J.D. 1941	Sportscaster	
Bill Daly	J.D. 1990	National Hockey League chief legal officer and executive vice president	
Lou Silver	LL.M.	Professional basketball player	
Paul Tagliabue	J.D. 1969	National Football League commissioner	
Jamila Wideman	J.D.	Professional basketball player	
Mark Wilf	J.D. 1987	Minnesota Vikings president and co-owner	

== Fictional alumni ==
Name	Media	References
Will Truman	Fictional lawyer (Will & Grace, 1998–2006)	
