= Louis D. Gibbs =

American politician

Louis DeWitt Gibbs (October 16, 1880 – March 1, 1929) was a Polish-born Jewish-American lawyer, politician, and judge from New York.

== Life ==
Gibbs was born on October 16, 1880, in Łódź, Poland, the son of merchant Isidor Gibbs and Pauline Greenbaum. The family moved to New York City in 1890.

Gibbs grew up on the Lower East Side and attended public schools there. He attended the Cooper Institute and New York Law School. He was admitted to the bar in 1907 and began a general law practice, winning recognition as a trial lawyer in all the New York City courts.

Gibbs had a law office in 150 Nassau Street. In 1912, he was elected to the New York State Assembly as a Democrat over Republican Louis P. Grimler, representing the New York County 32nd District. He served in the Assembly in 1913. While in the Assembly, he was a member of the judiciary committee and advocated for modern methods in the administration of criminal law, a subject he frequently lectured on since then. He also helped enact a law that the Bronx a separate county, and in 1914 he became the first judge of the Bronx County Court. He served on that court until 1925. In 1914, an attempt was made to kill him with a bomb placed in the courthouse exit he regularly used, although he was detained by chance and escaped injury.

Gibbs was a delegate to the 1924 Democratic National Convention. In 1924, he was elected Justice of the New York Supreme Court. He was still sitting on the Supreme Court when he died. He was considered a strict and severe judge, with a reputation among criminals as a tough judge. Due to his severity towards criminals brought before him and threats made against his life, he never went out without a bodyguard while a County Judge and refused to enter crowded elevators while a Supreme Court Justice.

Gibbs was an executive committee member of the American Jewish Congress from 1921 until his death. He was a member of the New York County Lawyers' Association, the New York State Bar Association, the American Bar Association, B'nai B'rith, the Knights of Pythias, the Modern Woodmen, and the New York Athletic Club. In 1906, he married Anna White, the daughter of New York City merchant Hyman White. Their children were Isadora Frances, Harriet, and Howard Jefferson.

Gibbs died in the Glen Springs Sanitarium in Watkins Glen, where he had been staying for three weeks for treatment to his poor health, on March 1, 1929. Over 1,500 people attended his funeral in the Riverside Memorial Chapel. The honorary pallbearers included fellow New York Supreme Court Justices Joseph M. Proskauer, Edward R. Finch, Francis W. Martin, James O'Malley, Edward J. McGoldrick, Ernest E. L. Hammer, Joseph M. Callahan, Alfred Frankenthaler, Thomas C. T. Crain, Edward J. Glennon, Francis B. Delehanty, Isidor Wasservogel, Curtis A. Peters, John Ford, Salvatore A. Cotillo, Richard H. Mitchell, Henry L. Sherman, Alfred H. Townley, Peter A. Hatting, and Aaron J. Levy, as well as General Sessions Judge Otto A. Rosalsky, City Court Justice William S. Evans, County Court Judge Albert C. Cohn, Magistrate George W. Simpson, United States Senators Royal S. Copeland and Robert F. Wagner, Bronx Surrogate George M. S. Schulz, Benjamin Antin, Samuel S. Koenig, and Bronx District Attorney John E. McGeehan. He was buried in Mount Hebron Cemetery.

New York State Assembly
Preceded by Morris S. Schector	New York State Assembly; New York County, 32nd District; 1913	Succeeded by Louis P. Grimler
