= Killing of Kawaski Trawick =

2019 police shooting in New York City

Kawaski Trawick (1986 – 14 April 2019) was an African American personal trainer and dancer who was shot and killed on 14 April 2019 by police officers at his home in the Bronx, New York City. The NYPD officers, Herbert Davis and Brendan Thompson, did not face any consequences for the killing.

== Biography ==
Trawick's family lived in Milledgeville, Georgia, about two hours southeast of Atlanta. His mother worked as a state prison guard and would leave early for her job, so Trawick often prepared his three younger siblings for school, cooked and did the laundry. Trawick graduated from Atlanta Technical College in 2013. In 2016 he moved to New York City, wishing to start a dance studio. Trawick lived in a few places when he first moved to New York before moving in mid-2018 to Hill House in the Bronx.

== Killing ==
On 14 April 2019 Trawick called 911 saying that he was locked out of his house, where there was food cooking on the hob, and claimed there was a fire. Firefighters left after letting him back into his home.

That evening, police were called by the apartment's superintendent and a security guard who said Trawick had been banging on neighbors' doors holding a serrated bread knife and a broomstick. The security guard had told 911 that Trawick was "losing his mind". Two NYPD officers were dispatched to the scene: Herbert Davis, a black officer with close to sixteen years on the force, and Brendan Thompson, a white officer with three years on the force. Davis approached Trawick's apartment, knocked on the door, and when nobody answered, knocked again and pushed the door ajar in the process. Trawick was found distressed, standing near his stove, holding both the serrated knife and the broomstick, asking the officers repeatedly why they were in his home. At this point, Davis drew his baton and Thompson drew his taser. The officers did not answer his question but asked him repeatedly to put down his knife; Trawick in turn replied that he had a knife because he was cooking.

Davis repeatedly tried to stop his less experienced partner from using force and told him "We ain’t gonna tase him". Trawick walked away to turn off a radio before turning to the officers and asking again why they were in his house. After repeatedly refusing to put down the knife, Trawick began to gesticulate and mutter to himself. Thompson tased Trawick, knocking him down, and dropped his taser. Trawick recovered enraged, screamed at the officers "I'm gonna kill you all! Get out!" and ran at them, knife in hand.

Davis again tried to stop Thompson from using his gun and briefly pushed his gun down, saying, "No, no — don't, don't, don't, don't, don't." Thompson, who had dropped his taser, fired at Trawick three times then once more, striking him twice. The door was closed afterward; accounts varied as to whether the officers closed the door or, as the official report stated, Trawick's body had fallen to the ground and blocked the door. The surveillance video appears to show Davis pushing several times to open the door. After opening it partially, Davis reportedly saw that Trawick was not breathing and concluded that he had already died.

== Reactions ==
Writing for ProPublica, Eric Umansky, wrote that the officers could have tried to make a connection with Trawick, as the NYPD trains its officers to do, and answered his question about why they were there, that they could have decided to not use force, or that they could have waited for help, as one former NYPD detective told him, since department policy is to "isolate and contain" people in crisis.

Bronx District Attorney Darcel Clark said the death "painfully illustrates" the fact that "urgent changes are needed in police response to mental health crises". On 12 August 2020, Clark issued a public statement saying that the case calls for "a thoughtful review of police procedures and training techniques" but that "we do not find that the facts warrant a criminal prosecution." The decision was criticized by Trawick's family and sparked calls for the officers to be fired. Nearly a year and a half after the shooting, Clark released separate body camera video clips depicting the moment when Thompson and Davis entered Trawick's apartment, and a month afterwards ProPublica published additional body camera footage, after the non-profit organization New York Lawyers for the Public Interest used a lawsuit to obtain it from the NYPD, showing a sergeant asking "Who’s hurt?" and two unidentified officers replying "Just a perp." State Attorney General Letitia James' office declared it would not take the case, citing a 2015 executive order.

Trawick's family and activists have urged the New York City Civilian Complaint Review Board, a civilian-led group investigating police misconduct, to begin a disciplinary trial that would fire the officers from their positions. New York City Public Advocate Jumaane Williams denounced the lack of disciplinary action and declared that the case represented a failure on the city's part to properly respond to mental health issues. Ileana Méndez-Peñate, a spokesperson for Communities United for Police Reform, declared that evidence showed that officers escalated the situation.

Edward Caban, the Police Commissioner of New York City, released a statement five years after the killing informing that neither Davis nor Thompson would face discipline for the killing.

== See also ==
- Death of Layleen Polanco
