= Robert T. Johnson (lawyer) =

American lawyer

Justice of the New York Supreme Court
- Incumbent
- Assumed office January 1, 2016

Bronx County District Attorney
- In office January 1, 1989 – December 31, 2015
- Preceded by: Paul Gentile
- Succeeded by: Darcel Clark

Personal details
- Born: Robert Thomas Johnson; 1948 (age 77–78) The Bronx, New York City, U.S.
- Party: Democratic
- Education: City College of New York BA); New York University (JD)

Military service
- Branch/service: United States Navy

Robert Thomas Johnson (born 1948) is an American attorney and jurist serving as a justice of the New York State Supreme Court in the county of the Bronx. He was previously a New York City Criminal Court judge, an acting justice of the New York State Supreme Court, and a long-time Bronx County district attorney in New York City.

== Early life and education ==
Johnson was born in the Bronx, and grew up in the Amsterdam Houses, a housing project on the Upper West Side of Manhattan. He went to James Monroe High School, then enlisted in the United States Navy in 1968, and went on to graduate from the City College of New York with a bachelor's degree in philosophy. In 1975, he graduated from the New York University School of Law.

== Early career ==
Upon graduating from law school, Johnson went to work as a defense attorney for the Legal Aid Society. In 1978, he became a prosecutor for the Bronx County District Attorney's office, eventually rising to the rank of Narcotics Bureau chief.

Johnson was appointed a New York City Criminal Court judge in 1986 by Mayor Edward Koch. He later served as an acting New York Supreme Court justice.

== Bronx County district attorney ==
In 1988, Johnson ran for Bronx County district attorney, and won the Democratic primary election in September. He was elected without opposition, as no Republican candidate had even filed to run in the race, making him the first African-American to be elected to the position of district attorney in New York State. He was re-elected six times, often without opposition.

In 2005, he became the longest-serving Bronx County district attorney.

Johnson was criticized at times for his performance as district attorney, with judges specifically criticizing his management and policies, noting that his office had a high rate of cases which it declined to prosecute. At the end of his tenure, Bronx prosecutors were winning jury trials less than half the time, a rate significantly lower than any other borough in New York City, and had a high percentage of dismissed cases and a persistent crippling backlog that affected both defendants and crime victims.

Notable cases

- Reversal of the conviction of Franklin Beauchamp by the New York Court of Appeals, a former teacher at a day-care center found guilty of nine counts rape and sodomy charges for sexually abusing three children, after the District Attorney's Office improperly drafted the indictment.
- Acquittal of Larry Davis, who was accused of shooting six New York City police officers.
- Acquittal of Anthony Rivers, who was accused of killing Officer Vincent Guidice in the line of duty.
- Acquittal of then New York City Police Officer Francis Livoti, who was charged with the murder of Anthony Baez after Officer Livoti placed Mr. Baez in a choke hold because an errant football struck a police vehicle.
- Acquittal of Amir Tawfiyq Abdullah Aziz who was charged with attempted murder for the shooting of New York City Police Captain Timothy Galvin.
- Acquittals of fifteen police officers from the 48th precinct accused of beating Oliver Jones.
- Acquittal of Officer Michael Meyer on charges of attempted murder who was accused of shooting Antoine Reed, a "squeegee man" who soaped up the windshield of the officer's car while it was stopped on an exit ramp of the Major Deegan Expressway.
- Acquittal of convicted felon Rafael Then, accused of running over a police officer and breaking her leg with a stolen car.
- Acquittals of the four New York City police officers who shot and killed unarmed African immigrant Amadou Diallo.
- After an indictment charging New York City Police Officer Richard Haste with the murder of Ramarley Graham for shooting and killing the unarmed teenager inside his own home was dismissed due to improper legal instructions provided by the District Attorney's Office, a second grand jury failed to bring charges against Officer Haste.
- Acquittal of Ophadell Williams, the bus driver accused of killing fifteen of his passengers after allegedly falling asleep, causing the bus he was driving to flip over and rip open.
- The wrongful conviction and imprisonment of Edwar Garry on murder charges for which he was later exonerated.
- The wrongful conviction of Calvin Bauri, who was sentenced to a fifty-year-to-life sentence for a double murder, and was kept imprisoned even after two witnesses signed affidavits that they lied at trial and another witness admitted to being the actual murderer.
- The wrongful conviction of Huwe Burton, a sixteen-year-old imprisoned for nineteen years after being forced to falsely confess to the murder of his mother.
- The wrongful convictions of five individuals charged with murdering taxi driver Baithe Diop in 1995.
- The dismissal of charges against Kalief Browder, an innocent teenager wrongfully jailed for three years and kept in solitary confinement and beaten by prison guards, even after the lone witness to the alleged theft of a backpack left the United States and rendered the District Attorney's Office unable to bring the case to trial. Kalief Browder subsequently committed suicide.

=== Dispute over the death penalty with New York Governor Pataki ===
On March 14, 1996, New York City police officer Kevin Gillespie was shot to death in the Bronx, and three men were immediately arrested in his killing. Ex-convict Angel Diaz was named as the gunman. The next day, Republican Governor George Pataki was publicly pressuring Johnson, an opponent of the death penalty, to seek it against Diaz, and threatening to take the case away from Johnson if he refused to do so. Johnson wrote in a letter to Pataki that he wanted the 120 days allotted under New York State law to decide whether or not to seek the death penalty, and threatened to take Pataki to court if he tried to remove him from the case. The following day, Pataki followed through on his threat and removed Johnson from the case, assigning it to Dennis Vacco, the New York State Attorney General. In response, Johnson sued Pataki for jurisdiction over the case.

Several weeks later, Vacco announced that he intended to pursue the death penalty, and the following day New York State Supreme Court Justice Howard Silver upheld Pataki's decision to remove Johnson from the case as within his authority.

In September 1996, Diaz hung himself in his jail cell, ending the practical aspects of the dispute. The two men arrested with Diaz, Ricardo Morales and Jesus Mendez, were eventually convicted of several charges including second degree murder in May 1997 and sentenced to mandatory life in prison, and on appeal, the New York Court of Appeals upheld Pataki's removal of Johnson as constitutional in December 1997.

=== Exit from the Bronx County District Attorney's office ===
As early as 2013, there were reports of an arrangement for Johnson to resign as Bronx County district attorney in return for a seat as a New York State Supreme Court justice in the Bronx. The plan was reportedly coordinated by New York State Assemblyman Carl Heastie, who held vast influence over Democratic Party nominations in his capacity as the party's county chairman.

Nevertheless, Johnson ran for re-election in 2015 for another term as Bronx County district attorney, and faced no opposition in the primary elections on September 10, which he won be default. Exactly one week later, on September 17, Johnson announced that he wanted to become a state judge. The announcement was met with severe and swift criticism by good government advocates, who said it was a transparent scheme engineered by Johnson and Democratic party power brokers to make sure the party could get the replacement district attorney of their own choice, not that of the voters. After receiving the judicial nomination by the Bronx Democratic Party the following week, Johnson then announced his resignation from his district attorney position. Under New York State Law, since the primary election had already taken place, the county parties named Johnson's replacements on the ballot, bypassing the voters. The replacement on the Democratic line was Darcel Clark, and in the heavily Democratic Bronx, she won the District Attorney's office by a landslide in the general election.

=== New York Supreme Court ===
Johnson's term on the Supreme Court ends in 2030. However, under New York law he will have to retire no later than December 31, 2018, at the end of the calendar year during which he will reach the age of 70. He will then be eligible to continue in office on senior status, without having to be re-elected, for three two-year periods.

== Personal life ==
Johnson is married to Presiding Justice Dianne T. Renwick of the New York State Supreme Court, Appellate Division, First Department.

Johnson previously lived in Fordham, Bronx. In 1994, he moved to the former house of Mario Procaccino, a candidate for mayor of New York City, that was located in an area of the Bronx between the Westchester County town of Pelham and Pelham Bay Park, known as Bronx Manor. While Procaccino faced criticism for living in that area during his mayoral campaign, according to Jane Gross of The New York Times, Johnson did not face controversy for moving there since he had only token opposition during his next election campaign for district attorney.

Legal offices
Preceded by Paul Gentile	Bronx County District Attorney; 1989–2015	Succeeded by Darcel Clark
