= Charles McLaughlin =

Charles McLaughlin may refer to:

- Charles B. McLaughlin (1884-1947), American lawyer
- Charles Borromeo McLaughlin (1913–1978), bishop of the Roman Catholic Diocese of Saint Petersburg
- Charles F. McLaughlin (1887–1976), American politician
