= List of killings by law enforcement officers in the United States, April 2019 =

This is a list of people reported killed by non-military law enforcement officers in the United States in April 2019, whether in the line of duty or not, and regardless of reason or method. The listing documents the occurrence of a death, making no implications regarding wrongdoing or justification on the part of the person killed or officer involved. Killings are arranged by date of the incident that caused death. Different death dates, if known, are noted in the description. The table below lists 67 people.

== April 2019 ==
Date	Name (age) of deceased	State (city)	Description
2019-04-30	April Robertson (45)	North Carolina (Welcome)	Robertson was shot and killed by police.
2019-04-29	Lawrence Bottoms (29)	Mississippi (Hancock County)	Bottoms was shot and killed by police.
2019-04-29	Jeb Colin Brock (42)	Oregon (Portland)	Brock was shot and killed by police.
2019-04-29	Alejandro Hernandez (26)	Arizona (Phoenix)	Hernandez was shot and killed by police.
2019-04-29	Isaiah Lewis (17)	Edmond, Oklahoma	Lewis was shot and killed by police. According to police an unmarked police patrol vehicle observed Lewis breaking into a house, which the officer responded to by shooting Lewis multiple times, killing him. An investigation is ongoing as of May 7, 2019.
2019-04-29	Shawna Widemann (49)	West Virginia (Welch)	Widemann was shot and killed by police.
2019-04-28	Carlos Manuel Dodero (45)	Texas (Austin)	Dodero was shot and killed by police.
2019-04-28	Jose Dominguez (47)	Nevada (Sparks)	Dominguez was shot and killed by police.
2019-04-26	Kevin Leroy Beasley Jr. (23)	Colorado (Westminster)	Beasley was shot and killed by a police officer.
2019-04-26	Max Helton (43)	Indiana (Clarksville)	Helton was shot and killed by police.
2019-04-25	Blayne Erwin Morris (23)	California (Lemoore)	Morris was shot and killed by police.
2019-04-25	Stanley Edward Thompson (51)	North Carolina (Apex)	Thompson was shot and killed by police.
2019-04-24	Emory Moore (29)	Kentucky (Owingsville)	Moore was shot and killed by police.
2019-04-24	Jonathan Patzel (29)	Colorado (Colorado Springs)	Officers Colton Graham and Thomas Walling, and others, responded to a chaotic disturbance at the Arbor Pointe Apartments, 2475 Hancock Expressway. Patzel reportedly pulled out a weapon and approached officers before he was shot. The District Attorney's Office ruled the officers' actions justified.
2019-04-22	Richard Allen Moench (50)	Montana (Shelby)	Moench was shot and killed by police.
2019-04-22	David Flores Ramos (32)	California (Los Angeles)	Ramos was shot and killed by police.
2019-04-21	Michael St. Clair (42)	Arkansas (Little Rock)	St. Clair was shot and killed by police.
2019-04-20	Carlton Steve Brooks (63)	Georgia (Athens)	Brooks was shot and killed by police.
2019-04-20	Anthony Jose Vega Cruz (18)	Connecticut (Wethersfield)	Cruz was shot and killed by police.
2019-04-20	Soheil Antonio Mojarrad (30)	North Carolina (Raleigh)	Mojarrad was shot by Raleigh Police Department officer William B. Edwards outside of a Food Lion in southeast Raleigh. Edwards was wearing a body camera, but it was not activated during the encounter and the shooting was not captured on any other cameras. According to the police report, Mojarrad was shot while holding a knife and advancing toward the officer, ignoring commands to drop the knife. Mojarrad's family later stated that he was suffering mental illness and a traumatic brain injury. The Wake County District Attorney considered the shooting justified, however As of 11 September 2019 Mojarrad's family is considering filing a civil suit.
2019-04-18	John Duane Fairbanks (40)	Minnesota (Coon Rapids)	Fairbanks was shot and killed by police.
2019-04-18	Michael Allen Felch (30)	California (Fremont)	Felch was shot and killed by police.
2019-04-18	Luiz Leizado aka "Murphy Brown" (42)	New York City, New York	Leizado was shot and killed by police.
2019-04-17	Akeen Brown (34)	Michigan (Summit Township)	Brown was shot and killed by police officers.
2019-04-17	John Stewart Jr. (46)	West Virginia (Pentress)	Stewart was shot and killed by police.
2019-04-16	Tyler R. Johnson (24)	New York (Lee)	Johnson was shot and killed by police.
2019-04-16	Chadwick Dale Martin Jr. (24)	South Carolina (Fountain Inn)	Martin was shot and killed by police officers.
2019-04-16	Patrick E. West (42)	Washington (Montesano)	West was shot and killed by police.
2019-04-15	Samuel Charles Talbott (42)	Tennessee (Pigeon Forge)	Talbott was shot and killed by police officers.
2019-04-14	Brian Dellaann Butts (33)	Kelso, Washington	Butts was shot and killed by police officers.
2019-04-14	Augustus Combs (27)	Texas (Dalhart)	Combs was shot and killed by police.
2019-04-14	William Crawford (47)	California (Los Angeles)	Crawford was shot and killed by police.
2019-04-14	Clarence Leading Fighter (32)	Nebraska (Rushville)	Fighter was shot and killed by police.
2019-04-14	Henry Lane (42)	California (Red Bluff)	Lane was shot and killed by police.
2019-04-14	Kawaski Trawick (32)	New York City, New York	Trawick was shot and killed by police. According to the NYPD, "there was no discipline as no wrongdoing was found." However, ProPublica cites it as an example of "police impunity".
2019-04-12	Luc Ciel (55)	California (Richmond)	Ciel was shot and killed by police officers.
2019-04-12	Myron Flowers (28)	Louisiana (Clinton)	Flowers was shot and killed by police.
2019-04-12	Evgeniy Lagoda (39)	New York City, New York	Lagoda was on a flight from Moscow to JFK International when he suffered a seizure. A Port Authority officer pepper sprayed and restrained Lagoda, who did not speak English. Lagoda became unresponsive and was pronounced dead. An autopsy deemed the death a homicide with blunt force injuries as a contributing factor.
2019-04-12	Juan Torres (39)	Arizona (Buckeye)	Torres was shot and killed by police.
2019-04-11	Demetrious Brooks (34)	Missouri (St. Louis)	Brooks was shot and killed by police.
2019-04-11	Phillip Thomas Marsh (30)	Florida (DeLand)	Marsh, who had been reported missing earlier in the week had previously made threats to commit suicide by cop. Around 2 p.m. local time Marsh carjacked a white pickup truck at gunpoint, then led police on a prolonged chaise on the local highway. Eventually the truck's tires were blown out by spikes police had laid on the road, and after he could no longer drive Marsh fled the vehicle and attempted to carjack another vehicle before fleeing into a nearby forested area. During this time both Marsh and the responding police officers fired multiple shots at each other. Eventually Marsh was hit multiple times by the police's bullets and apprehended. He was transported to hospital where he died. One of the responding police officers was grazed in the head by the bullet but the injury was minor.
2019-04-11	Marcus McVae (34)	Texas (Boerne)	McVae was shot and killed by police.
2019-04-11	Theresa Medina-Thomas (29)	Arizona (Ahwatukee)	Medina-Thomas was shot and killed by federal agents.
2019-04-10	John Darlington (57)	Florida (Mexico Beach)	Darlington was shot and killed by police.
2019-04-10	Trivenskey O. Odom (27)	Louisiana (Shreveport)	Odom was shot and killed by police.
2019-04-10	Anthony Santana (21)	California (Indio)	Santana was shot and killed by police.
2019-04-10	David Eugene Wittman (47)	Florida (Pinellas Park)	Wittman was shot and killed by police.
2019-04-09	Terry Davis Jr. (33)	Kentucky (Louisville)	Davis was shot and killed by police.
2019-04-09	Michael Gulley (32)	Indiana (Henry County)	A police officer on patrol noticed an individual walking along the I-70 highway. The police officer stopped and got out of his car to offer the individual a ride. As they were talking the suspect pulled out a gun and shot at the police officer. The police officer pulled out his weapon and shots were exchanged. The suspect was hit by bullets and transported to hospital where he died. He was later identified as Michael Gulley, and was found to be in possession of Methamphetamine. The officer was not injured.
2019-04-09	Michael Wray Hensley (28)	Colorado (Pueblo)	Two police officers on patrol spotted a suspicious individual. As they approached the man pulled out a gun and started firing before fleeing. One of the officers was shot in both legs. The officers returned fire, fatally injuring the suspect who was pronounced dead at the scene. The officer shot in the legs required hospitalization. The suspect was later identified as 28-year-old Michael Wray Hensley, who was wanted on parole violation.
2019-04-08	Harold Vincent Robinson (37)	Utah (Salt Lake City)	Robinson, who was suspected of perpetrating two armed robberies, was in a car being pursued by police officers through the city in their vehicles. The chase ended when Robinson crashed his car and opened fire at the officers with his rifle, striking one of them. The other officers opened fire, killing him.
2019-04-07	Charles Bradley Payne (42)	Tennessee (Hamilton County)	Police officers responded to a call reporting disorderly conduct encountered Payne holding a baseball bat and knife. Payne obeyed orders to drop the bat but then brandished a knife. The situation escalated quickly and one of the officers shot and killed Payne.
2019-04-07	Marzues Scott (35)	Arkansas (Blytheville)	Police confronted Scott who was the suspect of a previous event. Scott was uncooperative and a scuffle broke out. In the fight the officer shot Scott, who was later transported to local hospital where he died. The shooting raised tensions by some in the community because Scott was unarmed and black.
2019-04-07	Anthony Orlando Bowers (24)	Tennessee (Greeneville)	Police attempted to stop a vehicle which was speeding, which led the police on a pursuit. The car then stopped and the male driver fled into an apartment complex. The two officers interviewed the female passenger, who identified the driver as Joshua Howard, and that the two lived in the apartment complex. The two officers then went to Howard's apartment, where they confronted Howard and another man. The second individual pulled out a firearm and opened fire at the officers, striking both of them. The officers returned fire and shot the suspect. All three were transported to hospital, the two officers were treated with serious gunshot wound injuries, the suspect later died and was identified as 24-year-old Anthony Orlando Bowers.
2019-04-06	Benjamin B. Lucas (36)	Indiana (New Albany)	Police were called to make a welfare check on Lucas. As the police approached the house however, Lucas opened fire with a gun from inside the house. Lucas then exited the rear door of his house and continued to fire at police, who returned gunfire. Lucas was shot in the exchange and died.
2019-04-05	Oscar Cain (31)	Georgia (Atlanta)	Following unclear circumstances, Atlanta police officers pursued Cain into a heavily wooded area of the city. According to reports Cain eventually stopped running, turned around, and pulled out a gun. The officers responded by shooting, killing him. The incident was controversial in the city's black community as Cain had been a local African-American right's activist in Atlanta.
2019-04-05	Julius Glover (26)	Illinois (Bloomingdale)	Glover stole keys from a woman in a Walmart parking lot, then brandished a knife when store employees approached to help. Police officers happened to already be at the scene and gave chase. After a brief pursuit the vehicle was pulled over and surrounded by multiple officers. According to reports Glover disobeyed orders and brandished his knife in a threatening manner. When he started to approach one of the officers they opened fire, killing him.
2019-04-04	Daniel Robert Ramirez III (30)	California (Anaheim)	Police were attempting to serve an arrest warrant for Ramirez, who barricaded himself in his attic, refusing to come out and threatening to shoot the officers if they arrested him. A SWAT team was called in, and as they broke into the attic gunfire was exchanged. Ramirez was treated by on-scene paramedics but died at the scene shortly after. Two other men, 24-year-old Jesus Arturo Martinez, and 37-year-old Roy Arthur Smith, were arrested as they too had warrants.
2019-04-04	Thomas Verile Jr. (37)	Michigan (Kalamazoo)	Police were attempting to serve an arrest warrant on Verile, who was wanted for being a parole absconder, and also wanted on weapons and child abuse charges. Verile barricaded himself in a basement, whose house belonging either to family members or his girlfriend's niece. Verile threatened officers saying he had a weapon. In unclear circumstances four of the officers shot at Verile, who was later transported to hospital where he died hours later.
2019-04-03	Zachary Kinard (?)	South Carolina (Pelion)	At around 4 a.m. Lexington county police were alerted to an individual breaking into several cars. Shortly after police officers found Kinard driving a stolen car, and chased him when he refused to pull over. Kinard then lead police officers on a lengthy pursuit that spanned three separate counties. The pursuit ended when Kinard's vehicle flipped over after he took a turn too fast. As the police approached the stranded vehicle, from inside Kinard pointed a gun at him, and the officers responded by opening fire, killing Kinard.
2019-04-03	Alfonso Cervantes (50)	California (San Diego)	Cervantes was shot and killed by police.
2019-04-03	Jeffrey Garner (55)	Florida (Boynton Beach)	A man and a woman had an argument outside their apartment. The woman apparently tried to turn around and leave when the man pulled out a gun and shot her to death. The suspect was still shooting when 5 police officers responded to the scene. Police say that the man refused to drop the gun, and the officers opened fire, killing him. The man was later identified as 55-year-old Jeffrey Garner.
2019-04-03	Barry A. Rucker (53)	Indiana (Brownstown)	An onlooker called 911 after seeing Rucker and a woman having a prolonged altercation. Two officers responded, and as they approached the pair Rucker pulled out a gun, resulting in both officers shooting Rucker, killing him. The officers and the woman were not injured in the incident.
2019-04-02	Donnell James Lang (48)	California (Redding)	Police received multiple calls relating to a man acting suspiciously, pacing around. The suspect had what seemed to be a handgun in his pocket. As the police arrived, the suspect was initially cooperative, but then became suddenly uncooperative. After a brief struggle one of the officers shot the suspect, who was pronounced dead at the scene by medics. He was later identified as 48-year-old Donnell James Lang.
2019-04-01	Veltavious Griggs (19)	Georgia (Union City)	In so far undisclosed circumstances, Griggs and a police officer opened fire at each other with guns. The officer was shot and critically wounded, and was rushed to hospital were emergency surgery occurred. Griggs was pronounced dead at the scene.
2019-04-01	Bishar Hassan (31)	Alaska (Anchorage)	Hassan was shot and killed by police.
2019-04-01	Lianna Renee London (28)	Tennessee (LaFollette)	police were called to a house where there were reports of an armed woman trying to break in. Police confronted the suspect, and according to police reports the situation rapidly escalated and ended with the woman being shot and killed. She was later identified as 28-year-old Lianna Renee London.

== See also ==
- Death in custody § United States
- Henry A. Wallace Police Crime Public Database
- List of cases of police brutality
- List of countries with annual rates and counts for killings by law enforcement officers
- List of law enforcement officers killed in the line of duty in the United States
- List of law enforcement officers convicted for an on-duty killing in the United States
- List of shootings by US immigration agents
- List of police reforms related to the George Floyd protests
- List of unarmed African Americans killed by law enforcement officers in the United States
- Lists of killings by law enforcement officers
- Police brutality in the United States
- Police misconduct § United States
- Police riot § United States
- Police use of deadly force in the United States
