= Paul Gentile =

American lawyer

Paul Thomas Gentile

Bronx County District Attorney
- Preceded by: Mario Merola
- Succeeded by: Robert T. Johnson

Bronx County District Attorney (acting)
- In office October 27, 1987 – December 10, 1987

Bronx County District Attorney
- In office December 10, 1987 – December 31, 1988

Major Offense Bureau Director
- In office 1973–1985

Personal details
- Born: Paul Thomas Gentile; 1943 (age 82–83) The Bronx, New York City; United States
- Party: Democratic Party
- Education: Manhattan College; Fordham Law School

Paul Thomas Gentile (born 1943) is an American lawyer and politician. After being assistant District Attorney, Gentile served as the Bronx County District Attorney in New York City from October 1987 to 1988. He was initially appointed to replace Mario Merola after Merola's unexpected death in 1987.

== Early life ==
Gentile was born and grew up in the Bronx. He graduated from Manhattan College in 1965 and received his law degree from Fordham Law School in 1968.

== Career ==
In 1969, Gentile was hired by Bronx County District Attorney Burton B. Roberts to work as an assistant district attorney for his office. He became a career prosecutor, serving in the Bronx D.A.'s office as an assistant district attorney for the next 18 years, eventually rising to the rank of Chief Assistant Prosecutor for Mario Merola, who succeeded Roberts as the Bronx County District Attorney in 1972. Gentile was also the first director of the Major Offense Bureau established by Mr. Merola in 1973, a task force office designed to prosecute career criminals and organized crime entities.

When Merola died suddenly in October 1987 of a cerebral hemorrhage, Gentile was appointed by Governor Mario Cuomo to the position of Acting Bronx County District Attorney to serve out the rest of his term. In his statement, Cuomo cited Gentile's role in continuing the prosecution of the Bronx government officials involved in the Wedtech scandal, along with trusting Gentile continues to make "key tactical and strategic decisions" in existing investigations.

=== 1988 election and withdrawal ===
After his appointment as the Acting Bronx County District Attorney, Gentile, a Democrat, decided to seek a full term in the 1988 election. However, alongside reluctance of party leaders to endorse him, personal revelations surfaced that he and his first wife filed for divorce when she was nine months pregnant and put their son up for adoption, raising questions into his electability.

The Gentile campaign included high profile and widely publicized spats with New York City public officials. In a public dispute accusing former Mayor Rudy Giuliani of connection to organized crime and corruption, despite formerly endorsing him for the interim District Attorney seat, Giuliani criticized Gentile as a "McCarthy-like character" for leaking Federal Bureau of Investigation documents about Bronx prosecutor Philip Foglia. These documents claimed to connect Foglia to organized crime, and motivated Giuliani to request that Governor Mario Cuomo oust Gentile from office, a move ignored by Cuomo. Bronx Democratic Party leader George Friedman called Gentile "unelectable" at one point in his campaign, however, later clarified that he misspoke and formally endorsed Gentile for the nomination.

Despite a backing from Bronx Borough president Fernando Ferrer, Gentile no longer enjoyed enthusiastic support from key parts of the party and withdrew from the race. After his withdrawal, fellow Democrat Robert Johnson became the first black District Attorney in New York after winning the general election.

Legal offices
Preceded by Mario Merola	Bronx County District Attorney; 1987–1988	Succeeded by Robert T. Johnson
