= J. Sidney Bernstein =

Russian-born Jewish-American lawyer, politician, and judge

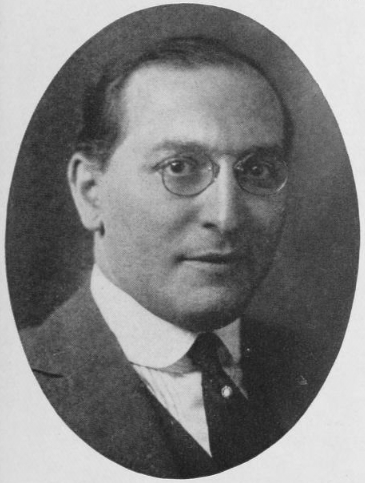

New York Supreme Court Justice
- In office 1938–1943

Member of the 129th New York State Legislature
- In office 1906–1906

Personal details
- Born: May 9, 1877 Russia
- Died: December 9, 1943 (aged 66) New York, US
- Spouse: Ida Rosenblum
- Children: 2
- Education: Queen's University at Kingston (A.M.); New York University School of Law (LL.B.)

Jacob Sidney Bernstein (May 9, 1877 – December 9, 1943) was a Russian-born Jewish-American lawyer, politician, and judge from New York.

== Early life and education ==
Bernstein was born on May 9, 1877, the son of Joseph and Jeanette Bernstein, in Russia. He moved to Montreal, Quebec with his parents when he was an infant. He attended public schools there and the Collegiate Institute in London, Ontario. He then went to Queen's University at Kingston, graduating from there with an A.M. in 1898. He then went to New York University School of Law, graduating from there with an LL.B. in 1900. He immigrated to America in 1897 and became a naturalized American citizen in 1902. He was admitted to the bar in 1902 and practiced law in New York City, New York.

== Career ==
In 1904, Bernstein unsuccessfully ran for the New York State Assembly as a Democrat in the New York County 31st District, losing to Republican Joseph Beihilf. He identified with the Democratic Party from a young age, serving as an active member of the Harlem Democratic Club and vice-chairman of the Tammany Hall General Committee of the 31st Assembly District. In 1905, he was elected to the Assembly in the 31st District, defeating Beihilf in a three-way election. He served in the Assembly in 1906. He lost the 1906 re-election to the Assembly to Republican candidate Philip Reece. In December 1906, New York State Comptroller-elect Martin H. Glynn appointed him Transfer Tax Appraiser of New York County. He held that office from 1907 to 1908. He was a delegate to the 1915 New York State Constitutional Convention.

Bernstein became associated with the law firm Hillquit & Hillquit as trial counsel when he was admitted to the bar. In 1907, he joined Stroock & Stroock and took charge of the firm's real estate firm. A year later, he opened his own law office. In 1932, he formed a partnership with Lester W. Patterson. The partnership ended when Patterson became judge of the Bronx County Court in 1934, at which point he formed a partnership with his son Arthur H. Bernstein. He was an unsuccessful candidate for the 1938 New York State Constitutional Convention. He was elected to the New York Supreme Court in 1938 and served as Justice until his death.

Bernstein was on the board of directors of the Jewish Memorial Hospital and a member of B'nai B'rith, the Manhattan Club, the Metropolitan Vigilant Club, the Tichnor Society, and the Grand Street Boys.

== Personal life ==
He was married to Ida Rosenblum of Chicago. Their children were Arthur H. (who served as a captain in the Army Chemical Warfare Service during World War II) and Mrs. Samuel Smith of Durham, New Hampshire. Bernstein died at home following a heart attack on December 9, 1943. Rabbi Louis I. Newman officiated his funeral at the Riverside Memorial Chapel. 700 people attended the funeral, including Representative Sol Bloom, Secretary of State and New York County Republican leader Thomas J. Curran, Tammany Hall secretary Bert Stand, City Clerk H. Warren Hubbard, Lieutenant Commander Jack Dempsey, Bronx County Judge Lester W. Patterson, General Sessions judges Jonah J. Goldstein, Owen W. Bohan, and Saul S. Streit, Supreme Court justices-elect Thomas A. Aurelio and Joseph A. Gavagan, and Supreme Court justices Ferdinand Pecora, Bernard L. Shientag, William T. Collins, Felix C. Benvenga, Bernard Botein, Aaron J. Levy, John E. McGeehan, Denis O'Leary Cohalan, Kenneth O'Brien, Morris Eder, William C. Hecht, Samuel Null, Edward Koch, Alfred H. Townley, and Edward J. Glennon. He was buried in Mount Hope Cemetery in Westchester County.

New York State Assembly
Preceded by Joseph Beihilf	New York State Assembly; New York County, 31st District; 1906	Succeeded by Philip Reece
