= Samuel J. Foley (district attorney) =

American politician

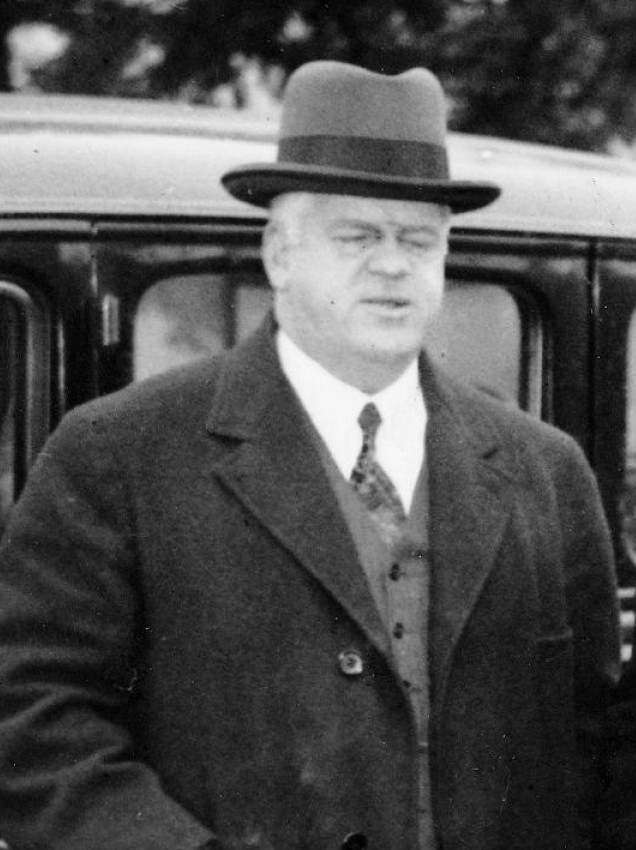
- Foley in 1935

Bronx County District Attorney
- In office March 22, 1933 – December 29, 1949
- Preceded by: Charles B. McLaughlin
- Succeeded by: George B. DeLuca

Personal details
- Born: 1891 Manhattan
- Died: May 14, 1951 The Bronx, New York City
- Resting place: Gate of Heaven Cemetery, Valhalla, New York
- Party: Democratic Party
- Spouse: Grace McLaughlin Foley
- Children: Samuel J. Foley Jr., Margaret Florence Foley, Michael Foley
- Parent: Samuel J. Foley (politician)
- Education: Georgetown University Law School
- Occupation: Lawyer, district attorney, judge

Samuel J. Foley (1891 – May 14, 1951) was the Bronx County District Attorney from 1933 to 1949, and a Bronx County Court judge from 1949 until his death.

== Early life ==
Foley was born on the Lower East Side in Manhattan. His father, also named Samuel J. Foley, was a member of the New York State Assembly from 1891 to 1895 and the New York State Senate from 1896 to 1906. The younger Foley graduated from Manual Training High School in Brooklyn, and later graduated from Georgetown University Law School in 1914, where he was also quarterback of the football team and captain of the basketball team. He served in Europe during World War I and was discharged as a captain.

== Professional career ==
In 1924, Foley was named an assistant district attorney in the Bronx by District Attorney Edward J. Glennon, and participated in the extradition of Bruno Hauptmann in the Lindbergh baby kidnapping case. When Charles B. McLaughlin, who succeeded Glennon, resigned as Bronx County District Attorney to become a New York State Supreme Court justice in March 1933, New York Governor Herbert H. Lehman appointed Foley as the replacement. In his first election to the district attorney office in November 1933, Foley ran on the Democratic and Recovery Party lines, although he had previously been a Democrat. He won the election easily, and was subsequently re-elected three more times. In 1945, he was president of the District Attorneys Association of New York State.

In a deal that was made in 1948 to create a fourth judgeship position on the Bronx County bench the following year, Judge Samuel Joseph, a Republican who was up for re-election for his judge position, obtained the endorsement of both the Republican and Democratic parties in the Bronx, with the understanding that in the following year, the Democratic nominee would also get the Republican nomination. That nominee was Foley. He won the election handily, and took office on December 23, 1949.

== Death ==
Foley died of an unspecified brief stomach ailment in Union Hospital in the Bronx on May 14, 1951, and was survived by his wife Grace née McLaughlin; three children, Samuel J. Jr., Margaret Florence, and Michael; and a sister, Mrs. Margaret Hughes. On the day of his funeral, an estimated 10,000 people lined the streets from his home at 2201 Andrews Avenue to Holy Spirit Roman Catholic Church at 1940 University Avenue, where the funeral was held. He is buried at Gate of Heaven Cemetery in Valhalla, New York.

Political offices
Preceded by Charles B. McLaughlin	Bronx County District Attorney; 1933–1949	Succeeded by George B. DeLuca
