= Daniel V. Sullivan =

American judge

Bronx County District Attorney
- In office January 1, 1955 – December 31, 1959
- Preceded by: George B. DeLuca
- Succeeded by: Isidore Dollinger

Personal details
- Born: February 14, 1886 New York City, New York, U.S.
- Died: January 8, 1966 (aged 79) Saranac Lake, New York, U.S.
- Resting place: Gate of Heaven Cemetery
- Party: Democratic
- Spouse: Marie Antoinette Clermont Sullivan
- Education: New York Law School (LLB)

Daniel V. Sullivan (February 14, 1886 – January 8, 1966) was an American lawyer and jurist who served as the Bronx County district attorney from 1955 to 1959.

== Early life and education ==
Sullivan was born in New York City on February 14, 1886, and graduated from New York Law School in 1910.

== Career ==
After graduating from law school, Sullivan established his own private practice and in 1935, became secretary to New York Supreme Court Justice John E. McGeehan. Later that year he was named to fill a vacancy on the New York Municipal Court. Four years later, he was designated by the Appellate Division to sit on the New York State Supreme Court, and in 1955 he was appointed by Governor Averell Harriman as the Bronx County district attorney. In the November 1955 election, Sullivan won a four-year term as district attorney, and served the entire term. In addition to the assortment of usual crimes, as prosecutor Sullivan most notably fought against juvenile delinquency and a racket that relabeled used television tubes and sold them as new.

After his retirement in 1960, Sullivan became a director for an insurance company and a legal consultant.

== Death ==
Sullivan died in Saranac Lake in Upstate New York. He is buried at Gate of Heaven Cemetery in Valhalla, New York.

Legal offices
Preceded by George B. DeLuca	Bronx County District Attorney; 1955–1959	Succeeded by Isidore Dollinger
