= Darcel Clark =

American attorney and prosecutor (born 1962)

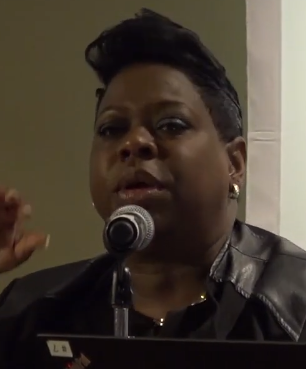

District Attorney of Bronx County
- Incumbent
- Assumed office January 1, 2016
- Chief Assistant: Derek Lynton (2017-present)
- Preceded by: Robert Johnson

Personal details
- Born: Darcel Denise Clark; April 2, 1962 (age 64) New York City, U.S.
- Party: Democratic
- Education: Boston College (BA); Howard University (JD)

Darcel Denise Clark (born April 2, 1962) is an American attorney and prosecutor who has served as the Bronx County District Attorney since 2016. Clark is the first woman to hold that office, and the first woman of color to serve as a district attorney in the history of the State of New York.

Prior to being elected district attorney, Clark served as a judge on New York City Criminal Court and subsequently on the New York Supreme Court in the Bronx and in that court's Appellate Division.

== Early life and education ==
Clark is a native of the Bronx. She was raised in the Soundview Houses in the South Bronx. Her father, Daniel, was a grounds supervisor and her mother, Viola, was a nurse and a member of the tenant patrol, which was formed in 1975 to keep neighbors and children safe. Clark attended New York City public schools and graduated from Harry S. Truman High School in the Bronx. Clark became the first member of her family to attend college.

She attended Boston College, graduating in 1983 with a Bachelor's of Arts degree. She then attended law school at Howard University, graduating in 1986.

== Career ==
Following law school, Clark returned to the Bronx, where she was hired as an assistant district attorney for Mario Merola, the Bronx County District Attorney at the time, and stayed under her immediate predecessor, Robert Johnson. Clark served as supervisor of the Narcotics Bureau from 1993 to 1997 and Deputy Chief of the Criminal Court bureau from 1997 to 1999.

In 1999, New York City Mayor Rudy Giuliani appointed Clark as a Judge for the Criminal Court for the City of New York, where she served for seven years. In 2006, Clark was elected to the Supreme Court in Bronx County, where she served until Governor Andrew Cuomo appointed her to serve as an Associate Justice of the Appellate Division of the First Department of the New York Supreme Court in November 2012.

=== Bronx County District Attorney ===
Clark decided to step down from the bench to seek election as the Bronx County District Attorney, following Johnson's decision to step down to seek a judgeship one week after his win in the primary election in September 2015. This sparked controversy, as much of the press perceived Johnson's decision as orchestrated by the Bronx Democratic Party to avoid selecting the next district attorney in the primary. Regardless, Clark easily defeated her Republican opponent, Robert Siano, in the November 2015 general election, garnering 86.64% of the vote. She is both the first woman and first African American woman to hold this position.

As district attorney, Clark has vowed to implement reforms to address wrongful conviction, administrative backlogs, and problems surrounding Rikers Island, among others.

=== Controversy and Criticism ===
Clark's tenure as District Attorney has been marred by reports of cronyism and misconduct. In May 2016, newspaper accounts revealed Clark to have rehired a friend who had been forced to resign from the District Attorney's Office years prior after impersonating a police officer, breaking a man's nose, and fleeing the scene of a crime in a fit of road rage. Reporting further revealed that Clark gave a prominent promotion and raise to the assistant district attorney responsible for the bungled prosecution of Kalief Browder. A federal civil rights lawsuit alleged that Clark and high-ranking members of her newly formed Public Integrity Bureau sought to harass and intimidate a police officer for issuing a traffic ticket to fellow Democratic party member Vanessa Gibson.

Another federal lawsuit claimed that Clark demanded the resignation of a disabled prosecutor after she requested handicap access to accommodate her wheelchair. Court filings in the conviction integrity investigation surrounding the murder conviction of Calvin Buari revealed that investigators acting on behalf of the Bronx District Attorney's Office sought to bribe and threaten a witness who exculpated the wrongly accused and imprisoned defendant, ultimately silencing this witness. Clark's prosecution of Sgt. Hugh Barry for the murder of Deborah Danner, an elderly woman suffering from a mental illness who was shot and killed in her home, resulted in an acquittal on all charges. Clark was later revealed to have suppressed evidence and kept an innocent teenager in jail for over one year on attempted murder charges until, on the eve of trial, Clark was forced to dismiss the case in the wake of a public outcry. Clark dismissed another case against a young man kept in jail for years without being convicted after claiming, again on the eve of trial, that the alleged witness to this murder could not be located. Clark refused to bring any charges in the murder of Layleen Polanco, a transgender woman being held on Riker's Island, even though surveillance video showed that guards tried to wake her for ninety minutes before calling for help and then laughed outside her jail cell. Clark also deadnamed Ms. Polanco in her press release. It has been revealed that the Corrections Officers were the top donors to Clark's re-election campaign. Clark also declined to prosecute anyone connected to the death of Jason Echevarria, who swallowed a ball of soap while in solitary confinement, only to have federal prosecutors later successfully prosecute the corrections captain with regards to Echavarria's death. Clark opposed affording immigrants the right to jury trials, only to have the New York State Court of Appeals rule against her, holding the Constitution guarantees immigrants and citizens alike the right to a speedy trial for serious offenses. Leaked internal documents showed that the Bronx District Attorney's Office was training its employees to violate defendants' Constitutional rights to speedy trials. Clark held Darrell Herring, an innocent man wrongfully accused of rape, in jail for eighteen months even though security footage and medical records in the possession of the Bronx District Attorney's Office exculpated Mr. Herring. In another case, Clark kept three people in jail waiting trial even though the sole witness to the alleged crime died one year prior. Clark attempted to quietly dismiss an indictment alleging that a physician's assistant on Rikers Island raped four women detainees after the Chief of her Discovery Compliance Bureau failed to comply with New York State discovery laws. After blocking evidence from being submitted to the United States Supreme Court in Hemphill v. New York by denying the request of the mother of a murdered child that the former prosecutor who tried the case be allowed to submit an amicus brief, Clark lost the appeal.

Clark received further criticism when she reduced the charges against Bui Van Phu, a 55-year-old felon and convicted sex offender. Phu was on lifetime parole for after serving 6 years for attempted robbery in 1991 and raping a 17-year-old girl at gunpoint in 1994. Phu was designated a Level 3 sex offender, the most dangerous designation under New York State Law. On August 12, 2022, Phu allegedly put on work gloves and, without provocation, brutally assaulted 52 year-old Jesus Cortez with a roundhouse sucker punch to Mr. Cortez' face from behind, so that Mr. Cortez could not see Phu as he initiated the assault. The unprovoked assault, the entirety of which was captured on surveillance video, left Cortez with a skull fracture, broken cheek, and brain bleeding. Cortez required brain surgery and was put in a medically induced coma. Police charged Phu with attempted murder in the second degree, a B-level violent felony offense. Clark subsequently office reduced the charges against Bui to assault and harassment, a misdemeanor and a violation. While the charges the police filed against Phu, or an assault in the first degree or attempted assault in the first degree charge, would have allowed a court to set bail, the charges Clark filed against Phu are not bail eligible. Accordingly, the judge who oversaw the arraignment of Phu was required to release Phu on his own recognizance.

Legal offices
Preceded by Robert Johnson	District Attorney of Bronx County; 2016–present	Incumbent
