= Wauhope Lynn =

Irish-American lawyer and politician (1856–1920)

Wauhope Lynn (December 14, 1856 – August 17, 1920) was an Irish-American lawyer, politician, and judge from New York City.

== Life ==
Lynn was born on December 14, 1856, in Ballymena, County Antrim, Ireland, the son of Crawford and Mary A. Lynn. His father was in America for years beforehand, but he returned to Ireland in 1846. When he lost the money he previously made in America, he went back to America with his family in 1867 and settled in the Fourth Ward of New York City, New York.

Lynn attended public school for a year, after which he began working. He started studying philosophical instrument making when he was seventeen, and while studying the trade he modeled the first telephone and gained a practical knowledge of electricity and its uses, which he later put to use as a lawyer. He was made foreman of the shop before he finished his apprenticeship. While working as a mechanic, he began studying to be a lawyer, attended night school, and joined the Cooper Union. While attending the latter school, his speaking abilities led to him being elected class president and to deliver Washington's Birthday oration in 1880. He then went to the New York University School of Law, graduating from there with honors in 1882. The law at the time required studying in a law office for three years, and since he couldn't afford to wait for three years he went to Albany and convinced the State Legislature to change the law to allow law school graduates could immediately take the examination to be admitted to the bar. He was then admitted to the bar himself.

In 1882, Lynn was appointed docket clerk in the county clerk's office. In January 1891, New York County District Attorney De Lancey Nicoll appointed him Deputy Assistant District Attorney. He was later promoted to Assistant District Attorney. In May 1892, Governor Roswell P. Flower appointed him a Civil Justice of the First District Court to fill a vacancy caused by the death of Judge Peter Mitchells. He was elected Justice in the November election that year. He was re-elected Justice in 1893. As Assistant District Attorney, he had a reputation of a rapid disposition of cases; at one point, he disposed 289 cases before the General Sessions Court, a record at the time. In 1900, he was elected to the New York State Assembly as a Democrat, representing the New York County 3rd District. He served in the Assembly in 1901. In the Assembly, he introduced a bill that would "compel the printing of newspapers in type of a specified size" "for the protection of the eyesight of the readers." The proposed bill was publicized and called "absurd" by the press. In May 1905, Mayor George B. McClellan Jr. appointed him Municipal Court Justice to fill a vacancy caused by Daniel E. Finn's appointment to Magistrate. He was elected to a full term to the Municipal Court in the November election that year. He served as Justice until the end of 1919.

Lynn first visited Good Ground, known at the time as Ponquogue, in Southampton as a summer visitor and quickly loved the area. He purchased his first land there in 1890, a large portion of an "amendment" in the Lower Division of the Quogue Purchase, and in 1892 he built his country seat and summer home there and called it Lyncliff. He also purchased land in Long Island, including on Peconic Bay and in Southold. By 1903, he owned nearly a thousand acres of land. In response to notices forbidding land on the premises of other people's property, he placed notices on his own land declaring "free shooting allowed on these grounds."

Lynn was active in Irish affairs in New York City and was a member of the Irish Land League, the Iroquois Club, and the Monticello Club. He was married to Anna Nelson. They had one son, Norman. Anna died in 1910 from peritonitis. In 1912, he married Mrs. Catherine Corson.

Lynn died at his summer home in Lynncliff from heart disease superinduced by indigestion on August 17, 1920. His funeral was held at the University Place Presbyterian Church, with pastor Rev. Dr. Robert Speer conducting the funeral service. A large number of Tammany Hall members, led by Charles F. Murphy, attended the funeral. The honorary pallbearers included Murphy, Tammany Society grand sachem John R. Voorhis, Justice Leonard A. Giegerich, Deputy Commissioner of Correction William Dalton, former Senator George W. Plunkitt, former Justice Robert A. Luce, Park Department secretary Willis Holly, former Municipal Court Justice Henry W. Unger, and Eugene J. Reilly of the Register's office. He was buried in Green-Wood Cemetery.

New York State Assembly
Preceded by Michael T. Sharkey	New York State Assembly; New York County, 3rd District; 1901	Succeeded by Anthony J. Barrett
