= Killing of Ramarley Graham =

2012 police killing of a black man in New York City

Ramarly Graham
- Ramarley Graham in 2007
- Date: February 2, 2012
- Time: 3:00 PM (UTC-05:00)
- Location: The Bronx, New York City
- Type: Police killing of suspect
- Deaths: 1 (Ramarley Graham)
- Accused: Richard Haste
- Charges: Manslaughter
- Verdict: No true bill
- Litigation: $3.9 million lawsuit settled against New York City

The killing of Ramarley Graham took place in the borough of the Bronx in New York City on February 2, 2012. Richard Haste, a New York Police Department officer, shot Graham in the bathroom of the latter's apartment. The 18-year-old Graham was in possession of marijuana when Officer Haste tried to stop him on the street. Graham fled to his grandmother’s house, and went into the bathroom to flush the marijuana. Officer Haste forced his way into the building, kicked down the front door and then broke down the bathroom where he shot Ramarley Graham to death. Haste could be seen on surveillance cameras smiling and laughing with the responding officers and detectives—the same men who would later testify they had told Haste that Graham had a gun. Haste claimed to believe Graham had been reaching for a gun in his waistband, but no weapon was recovered.

Haste was charged with manslaughter, but the charge was dropped. On the day the judge dismissed the charges, rows of NYPD officer lined the courthouse steps and applauded Haste as he exited. The blue salute took place right in front of Ramarley Graham's family. The city of New York settled a civil suit, paying the family $3.9 million in 2015 although the NYPD Firearms Discharge Review Board found the shooting to be within department guidelines. In 2017, an internal NYPD investigation explored whether Haste used "poor tactics" leading up to the shooting. The investigation led to a determination of fault on the part of Haste. He ultimately resigned from the NYPD rather than face separation of employment.

== Background ==
Ramarley Graham was an 18-year-old Jamaica-born teenager from the Bronx, the son of Constance Malcolm and Franclot Graham. Richard Haste was a police officer serving on the NYPD's Street Narcotics Enforcement Unit (SNEU). Haste had six prior Civilian Complaint Review Board complaints, although none were substantiated.

== Shooting ==
Graham was spotted by officers from the NYPD's Street Narcotics Enforcement Unit as he left a bodega on White Plains Road and East 228th Street on Thursday, February 2, 2012, at approximately 3:00 PM. The officers alleged that they witnessed Graham adjusting and tugging a gun at his waistband. The officers then began to follow Graham as he left the bodega and went into an apartment building, reporting over their radio that they saw the "butt of a gun" on the teen. No gun was recovered. The officers claimed that they approached Graham when he left the building, identifying themselves as police officers and telling him not to move. Then, the officers stated in their official report, Graham started to run from them toward his home. However, video evidence showed Graham casually walking into his home while officers followed in pursuit.

According to video footage from a nearby private home, Richard Haste chased Graham into the home he shared with his grandmother. Haste did not have permission to enter the home. Haste entered upon his own volition, hurriedly opening the front door to the private home, running inside to follow Graham. Graham was in the bathroom, dumping a small amount of marijuana that was wrapped in aluminum foil, attempting to flush it down the toilet. Haste shot multiple rounds into the 18 year old, killing him in front of his grandmother. Graham was pronounced dead a short time later at nearby Montefiore Medical Center. There was no confrontation or struggle between Graham and Officer Haste, and no weapon was ever recovered from the scene. Haste was immediately placed on modified duty. He was charged with manslaughter four months later, in June 2012, and pleaded not guilty.

Bronx County Supreme Court Justice Steven Barrett later vacated Haste's manslaughter indictment, ruling the prosecution had given the grand jury flawed instructions. He dismissed the indictment without prejudice and gave the district attorney the option to seek an indictment from another grand jury at a later date. The Bronx County District Attorney’s office presented evidence before another grand jury in 2013, but the grand jury declined to re-indict Haste on charges of manslaughter.

The NYPD performed an internal disciplinary review of the incident, which found that Haste used "poor tactical judgment and recommended his dismissal." Haste was informed of the decision on March 24, 2017, and upon learning that he was to be terminated, submitted his resignation two days later.

== Lawsuit ==
The lawsuit by Graham's family alleging civil rights violations by the NYPD was settled for $3.9 million in January 2015. Of that total, $2.95 million was given to Graham's estate, while Graham's brother received $500,000, his grandmother received $400,000, and his mother received $40,000.

== See also ==
- List of unarmed African Americans killed by law enforcement officers in the United States
