= The Bertrand Russell Case =

1941 book about a 1940 New York court case

Kay v. Board of Higher Education
- Court: Supreme Court of New York, New York County
- Full case name: In the Matter of the Application of Jean Kay, Petitioner, v. Board of Higher Education of the City of New York
- Decided: March 30, 1940
- Citation: 1193 Misc. 943 18 N.Y.S. (2d) 821 (1940)

Court membership
- Judge sitting: John E. McGeehan

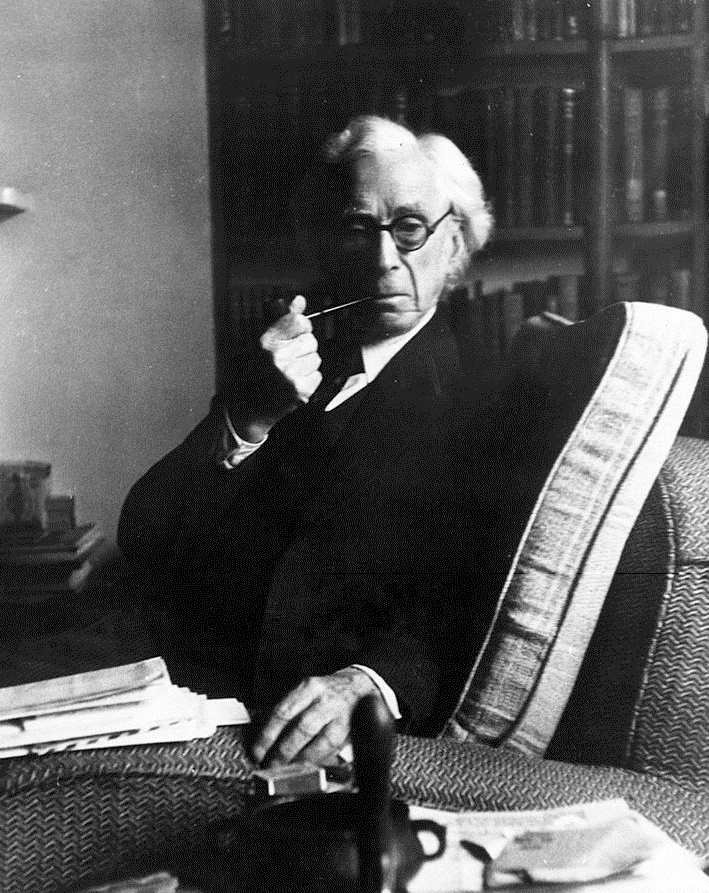
Bertrand Russell

The Bertrand Russell Case, known officially as Kay v. Board of Higher Education, was a case concerning the appointment of Bertrand Russell as Professor of Philosophy of the College of the City of New York, as well as a collection of articles on the aforementioned case, edited by John Dewey and Horace M. Kallen.

== Background ==
In 1940, Bertrand Russell was hired by the City College of New York to teach classes on logic, mathematics, and metaphysics of science. This appointment was made controversial by William Thomas Manning, the Episcopal Bishop of New York City, who argued that due to Bertrand Russell's writings against religion and approval of sexual acts disapproved of by traditional Christian teachings, he should not be instated as a professor. Following Manning's denunciation, a group of religious individuals lobbied New York City government institutions to reject Bertrand Russell's position as professor. However, despite that pressure, Russell was confirmed by the New York Board of Higher Education. Following that decision, the matter was taken to the New York Supreme Court by Jean Kay, who argued that her daughter would be morally compromised should she study under Russell even though her daughter could not have been a student at CCNY, which at that time exclusively enrolled male students.

== Court case ==
The judge hearing the case was the Irish Catholic John E. McGeehan, who ruled against Russell's appointment on three criteria. First, McGeehan argued that Russell should not be allowed to teach due to his status as a non-citizen of the United States, whom New York law prohibited from teaching in public schools. Second, McGeehan wrote that Russell was not given a competitive examination of his merit for the position to which he was appointed. Thirdly, McGeehan concluded that Russell held immoral views regarding sexuality on the basis of four of his popular and non-philosophic books (On Education, What I Believe, Education and the Modern World, and Marriage and Morals), and that his opinions regarding sexual relations between college-aged students amounted to an endorsement of abduction, rendering him morally unfit to teach philosophy and an advocate of lawlessness. In the books, Russell advocated for sex before marriage, homosexuality, temporary marriages, and the privatization of marriage, among other things.

Russell was prevented from appearing in court and an appeal by the American Civil Liberties Union was denied in several courts. The City of New York's lawyers told the Board of Higher Education that the verdict would not be appealed. A few days later Mayor La Guardia removed the funds for the position from the budget.

Judge McGeehan's ruling was published as Kay v. Board of Higher Ed. of City of New York, 193 Misc. 943 18 N.Y.S. (2d) 821 (1940).

== Aftermath ==
When Russell published An Inquiry into Meaning and Truth, the lectures he gave at Harvard that fall, he added "Judicially pronounced unworthy to be Professor of Philosophy at the College of the City of New York" to the listing of distinctions and academic honors on the title page in the British version. Russell commented on Judge McGeehan, writing, "As an Irish Catholic, his views were perhaps prejudiced," and compared his case to the case against Socrates saying that "precisely the same accusations were brought — atheism and corrupting the young."

Following his dismissal, Russell was hired by Albert C. Barnes, who wrote the foreword for The Bertrand Russell Case, to teach for the Barnes Foundation. However, Barnes dismissed Russell in December 1942 due to his distaste for lecturing and his impolite attitude towards students, which violated Barnes's ideas of democracy and education.

== Book by Dewey and Kallen ==
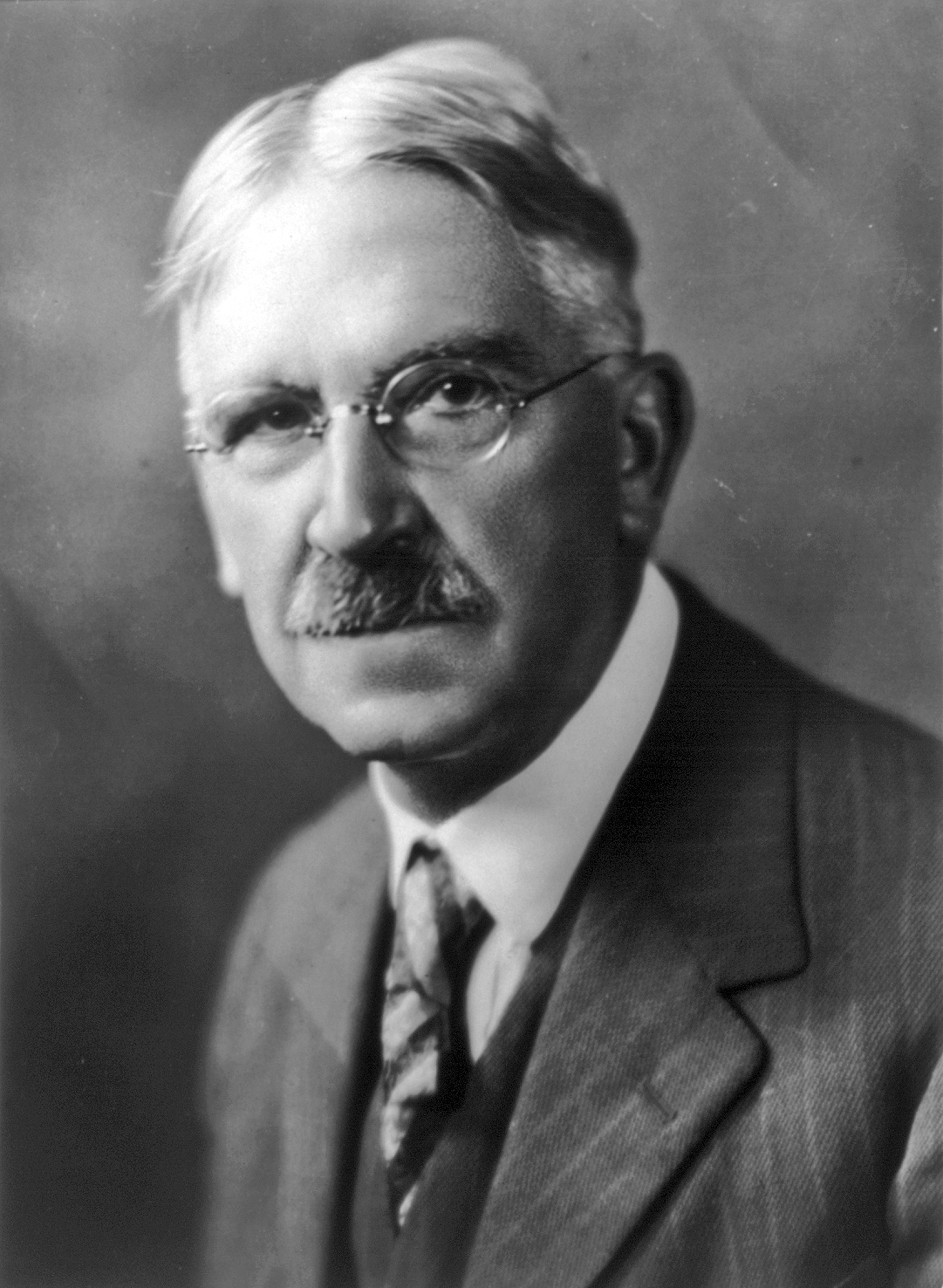
John Dewey

In 1941, John Dewey and Horace M. Kallen published The Bertrand Russell Case, a collection of articles defending Russell's appointment and criticizing McGeehan's ruling, characterizing it as unjust, punitive, and libelous.

=== Themes ===
A major theme treated by the book is the necessity of academic freedom in American universities. Many of the essayists featured in the Bertrand Russell Case see Russell's dismissal as a microcosm of American democracy, in which freedom of expression is stifled by religious individuals. Additionally, many of the book's authors discuss at length the necessity for academic disciplines to feature counter-cultural thinkers, as they are skeptical of a framework of thought enforced by religious or political individuals.

=== Contents ===
The Bertrand Russell Case contains an introduction by John Dewey, a foreword by Albert C. Barnes, and nine essays. Kallen and Dewey each contributed a single essay to the collection. While most of the articles are written by philosophers and other academics and argue in favor of Russell and academic freedom, the article "The Attitude of the Episcopal Church," which argues that Manning's assertions do not reflect the opinion of the church as a whole, was written by Guy Emery Shipler, editor of The Churchman, and "The Case as a School Administrator Sees it" was written by Carleton Washburne, an Illinois school superintendent.

=== Reception ===
The Bertrand Russell Case was celebrated by many academics for its defense of academic freedom. In a review for the American Association of University Professors, Peter A. Carmichael writes, "The authors of this book deserve praise for their able defense of intellectual freedom and of a very great intellect," despite the book's lack of any religious perspective. Writing for the History of Science Society's publication Isis, M. F. Ashley Montagu characterizes The Bertrand Russell Case as "an important book" and argues that all scholars should read it in order to better resist the encroachment of religious forces into science and academic study.

== Bibliography ==
- Bertrand Russell, The Autobiography of Bertrand Russell: The Middle Years: 1914-1944. Bantam, 1969.
- Thom Weidlich. Appointment Denied: The Inquisition of Bertrand Russell. Prometheus Books, 2000.
