= Charles B. McLaughlin =

American judge

Bronx County District Attorney
- In office January 1, 1930 – March 17, 1933
- Preceded by: John E. McGeehan
- Succeeded by: Samuel J. Foley

Personal details
- Born: 1884 Manhattan
- Died: December 8, 1947 (aged 62–63) The Bronx, New York City
- Resting place: Gate of Heaven Cemetery, Valhalla, New York
- Party: Democratic Party
- Spouse: May La Tour McLaughlin
- Children: Charles B. McLaughlin, William B. McLaughlin, Robert E. McLaughlin, Mrs. Edward H. McAloon, Mrs. Francis J. O'Brien
- Education: Manhattan College, New York University Law School
- Occupation: Lawyer, district attorney, judge

Charles B. McLaughlin (1884 – December 8, 1947) was the Bronx County District Attorney from 1930 to 1933 and a justice of the New York State Supreme Court from 1933 until his death in 1948.

== Early years ==
McLaughlin was born on the Lower East Side of Manhattan, and went to high school at the La Salle Academy. He received a Bachelor of Arts degree from Manhattan College in 1905, a Master of Arts degree in 1905, and a law degree from New York University Law School in 1907.

== Professional career ==
After law school, McLaughlin initially went to work for a private law firm. He ran for a New York City alderman post in 1913, although unsuccessfully. The following year, he was appointed as an assistant district attorney by Francis W. Martin in the newly created Bronx County District Attorney office, and eventually rose to the position of chief assistant district attorney. He returned to private practice in 1921, but ran for election as Bronx County District Attorney with the backing of the Democratic Party in 1929, and won. After being sworn in as district attorney on January 1, 1930, during his term he paid particular attention to fighting organized crime and racketeering in the building construction industry.

After serving as district attorney for a little more than three years, McLaughlin was appointed by New York Governor Herbert H. Lehman to a vacant seat on New York Supreme Court bench in March 1933. He then won a full 14-year term on the bench in the election in November 1933. During his judicial tenure, he made numerous rulings on real estate matters, frequently lowering inflated property valuations, and easing property taxes. He was re-elected on the Democratic, Republican, Liberal, and American Labor party lines in November 1947, but died a month later, before his second term started.

== Death and burial ==
McLaughlin died on December 8, 1947, at his home at 2613 Grand Avenue in the Bronx, and is buried in Gate of Heaven Cemetery in Valhalla, New York.

Legal offices
Preceded by John E. McGeehan	Bronx County District Attorney; 1930–1933	Succeeded by Samuel J. Foley
