= George DeLuca =

American politician

George B. DeLuca
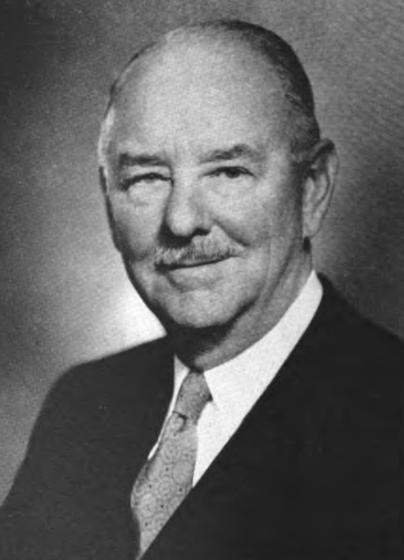

Lieutenant Governor of New York
- In office January 1, 1955 – December 31, 1958
- Governor: W. Averell Harriman
- Preceded by: Walter J. Mahoney (acting)
- Succeeded by: Malcolm Wilson

Bronx County District Attorney
- In office January 1, 1950 – December 31, 1954
- Preceded by: Samuel J. Foley
- Succeeded by: Daniel V. Sullivan

Personal details
- Born: George Benjamin DeLuca; September 20, 1889 West Bronx, New York, U.S.
- Died: May 2, 1983 (aged 93) The Bronx, New York, U.S.
- Party: Democratic
- Spouse: Mary M. Reilly (m. 1916; died 1967)
- Children: 3
- Education: City University of New York, City College; Columbia Law School
- Profession: Lawyer, Banker

George Benjamin DeLuca (September 20, 1889 – May 2, 1983) was an American lawyer, banker and politician. He was the lieutenant governor of New York from 1955 to 1958.

== Life ==
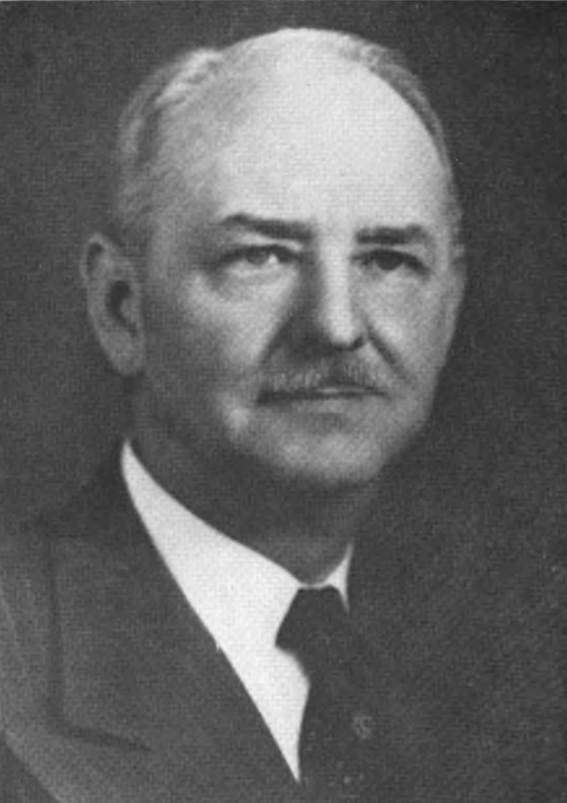
DeLuca during his first term as Lieutenant Governor.

He was the son of Mariano DeLuca and Catherine (Bonetti) DeLuca. His parents came to the United States in the 1880s from the Province of Belluno.

He was Bronx County District Attorney from 1950 to 1954. He was Lieutenant Governor of New York from 1955 to 1959, elected on the Democratic ticket with Governor W. Averell Harriman in 1954, but defeated for re-election in 1958. He was a delegate to the 1956 and 1960 Democratic National Conventions.

He was a vice president of the Commercial Bank of America, elected in 1959.

He lived in Riverdale, in the Bronx.

He died at North Central Bronx Hospital.

== General Reference ==
- George De Luca Papers, 1949-1964. M.E. Grenander Department of Special Collections and Archives, University Libraries, University at Albany, State University of New York (hereafter referred to as the De Luca Papers).

== Sources ==
- Political Graveyard
- George DeLuca, 93, Ex-Judge and 50's Lieutenant Governor Obituary in New York Times, May 3, 1983.

Party political offices
Preceded by Richard H. Balch	Democratic nominee for Lieutenant Governor of New York; 1954, 1958	Succeeded by John J. Burns
Political offices
Preceded by Walter J. Mahoney; Acting	Lieutenant Governor of New York; 1955–1958	Succeeded by Malcolm Wilson
Legal offices
Preceded by Samuel J. Foley	Bronx County District Attorney; 1950–1954	Succeeded by Daniel V. Sullivan
