= Death of Layleen Polanco =

Transgender woman who died in prison

- Date: June 7, 2019; 7 years ago
- Location: Rikers Island, New York, U.S.
- Cause: Seizure

Layleen Xtravaganza Cubilette-Polanco was a 27-year-old Afro-Latina transgender woman who died at Rikers Island, New York City's main jail complex, on June 7, 2019, in solitary confinement after staff failed to provide her with medical care that could have saved her life for 47 minutes following an epileptic seizure. After a six-month investigation, the New York City Department of Investigation (DOI) and Bronx District Attorney Darcel Clark claimed that staff members were not responsible for Polanco's death. Records indicate that officers had extensive knowledge of Polanco's epilepsy, she having already suffered multiple seizures at Rikers.

A video of the incident revealed that multiple staff members knocked on Polanco's cell door and that she was unresponsive. In the presence of her unresponsive body, officers could be seen laughing. The DOI stated that officers thought Polanco was napping and that the laughter was unrelated. A wrongful death lawsuit was filed by David Shanies, the attorney for the Polanco family. Polanco's death reignited conversations about banning cash bail and pretrial detention. Melania Brown, Polanco's sister, and many others called for banning solitary confinement in New York City after Polanco's death.

== Life ==
Polanco's family home was in Yonkers, New York. Polanco was part of New York City's ballroom scene as a member of the House of Xtravaganza and was a friend of Pose star Indya Moore.

According to her sister, Melania Brown, Polanco had last been home in April. She states Polanco "became very depressed" as opposed to her usual bubbly self whilst trying to get her life together by looking for jobs or trying to go to school, but "faced discrimination in these pursuits as a trans woman", being "turned away from every door she tried to walk in".

== Death ==
Polanco was arrested in April 2019 on misdemeanor assault charges and held on $500 bail from a 2017 drug and sex work charge. Polanco was sent to the jail because she could not afford the bail.

On May 14, Polanco was sentenced to 20 days in solitary confinement for a physical altercation with another individual in custody at the Transgender Housing Unit dormitory. On May 15, she exhibited intense feelings of psychological distress, including suicidal ideation, hallucinations, and panic attacks. In the notes section of a report, an "officer wrote 'inmate randomly crying, shouting.'" While in a distressed state, Polanco reportedly assaulted an officer on the arm "with her fist out." She was sent for a nine-day stay in Elmhurst Hospital for "psychosis/mania", eight of which were spent in a psychiatric prison ward.

On May 24, Polanco returned to Rikers. Correction staff debated where to place her. The department's tour commander wrote that a psychiatrist could not authorize solitary confinement for Polanco because of her seizure disorder. However, Polanco was placed in solitary confinement on May 30 after clearance from a Correctional Health Services medical doctor. The Board of Correction found that the jail's housing policy to not place trans women with cisgender women created "increased pressure" to isolate Polanco. However, officials did consider placing Polanco in a men's facility.

Although officers knew of her epilepsy and Polanco had already suffered multiple seizures at the facility, she was ultimately "cleared" for solitary confinement, where she spent 17 hours a day in a cell. The doctor wrote that, despite her medical history, "her condition has been stable." On the day of Polanco's death she was left alone for periods of 57 minutes, 47 minutes and 41 minutes, even though "DOC policy stipulates that inmates placed in solitary confinement should be observed every 15 minutes." As a result, Shanies described the conditions which led to Polanco's death as follows:

When an epileptic person has a seizure, they are at great risk of injury or death and unable to help themselves. They can fall, suffer trauma, or stop breathing, among other things. That is exactly how Layleen died. By leaving her locked in a cell, unmonitored, the jail created the risk of Layleen's suffering a fatal seizure. This is not a case of a mistake or a medical problem that slipped through the cracks. This was a thought-out decision to put a person in a situation where the risks of injury and death were obvious and known.

The seizure was Polanco's third while in custody. The DOI published Polanco's deadname in an official report following her death and later apologized for doing so.

== Aftermath ==
The first report of Polanco's death was a four-sentence report by the New York Post that did not mention Polanco's name. In response, the New York City Anti-Violence Project organized a rally for Polanco on June 10, in which 600 people attended, including Janet Mock and Indya Moore. On June 26, the New York AVP issued a letter of demands to Governor Andrew M. Cuomo and Mayor Bill de Blasio, which included "the expedition of the results of Layleen's autopsy; the disbandment of solitary confinement and restrictive housing units in New York state; the decriminalization of sex work in the state; and housing, health care, and employment programs for TGNCNB people across New York." Melania Brown and about twenty of Polanco's friends and family members marched with the New York City Anti-Violence Project at New York Pride in July 2019.

On June 14, 2020, during the coronavirus outbreak, about 15,000 protesters marched down Brooklyn's Eastern Parkway in solidarity with black trans lives, organized by The Okra Project, which provides meals to black trans people, and the Marsha P. Johnson Institute. Brown was in attendance and stated, "My sister is not here to fight for herself, but I'm here. We're here, and they've got to make room for us. And if they don't, we're taking it." Video footage of Polanco's death released in June provoked public outrage. The footage, featuring officers laughing in the presence of Polanco's unresponsive body, was disturbing and deeply troubling to the Polanco family. Family attorney David Shanies described it as "the last bit of indifference that we saw toward a person who obviously needed help."

== See also ==
- Kawaski Trawick
