= Willis Holly =

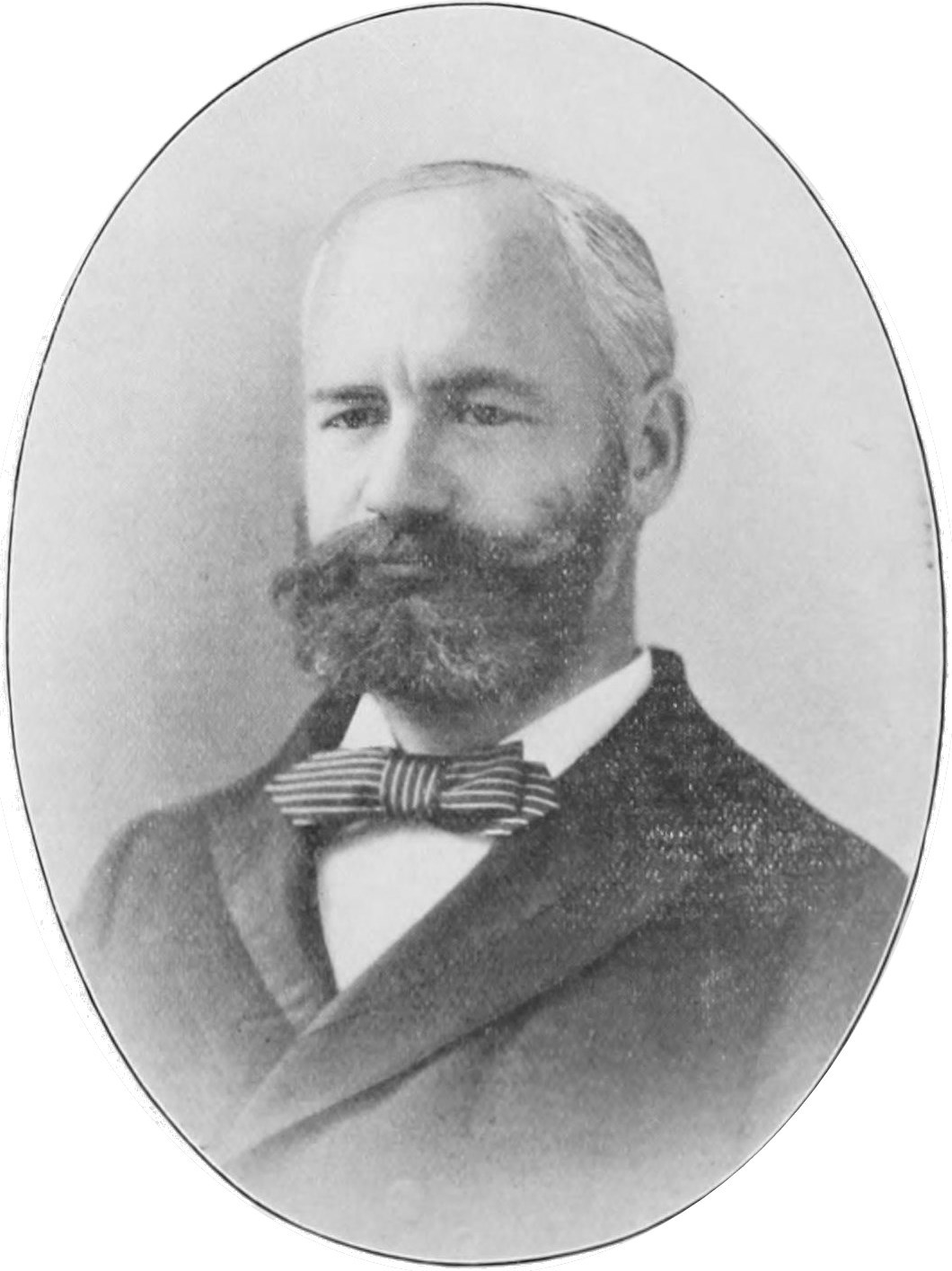

Willis Holly (July 4, 1854 – August 4, 1931) was secretary of the New York City Department of Parks and Recreation and a member of Tammany Hall. He entered politics in the administration of Mayor Hugh J. Grant, and became Mayor Thomas Francis Gilroy's secretary. He died on August 4, 1931, at his apartment at the Hotel Chelsea.
