= Tsion Gurmu =

Ethiopian-American lawyer

- Born: 1988 (age 37–38); Axum, Ethiopia.
- Education: University of Chicago; New York University School of Law
- Occupation: Attorney
- Known for: Immigration attorney

Tsion Gurmu (born 1988), is an Ethiopian-American attorney, writer, and researcher specializing in migration. She serves as the Legal Director of the Black Alliance for Just Immigration (BAJI), a national immigrant rights organization in the U.S. dedicated to people of African descent.

Gurmu is the Founder and Director of the Queer Black Immigrant Project (QBip), an initiative aims to address the legal and social needs of LGBTQIA+ Black migrants and highlighting global injustices of homophobia and anti-Black racism. She serves as a trusted advisor and board member, including with the Immigrant Legal Resource Center (ILRC) and the American Bar Association (ABA) Commission on Immigration.

== Background ==
=== Early life ===
Tsion Gurmu was born in Axum, Ethiopia, during the late 1980s civil war. Her father, a political organizer imprisoned under the Derg military regime, and her mother were in hiding at the time of her birth. Gurmu spent her early childhood in Addis Ababa with her grandmother before reuniting with her parents in the United States, who had sought asylum. Growing up in Atlanta's Buford Highway community, Gurmu was surrounded by African asylum-seekers, which sparked her interest in immigration and international human rights law.

=== Education ===
Gurmu earned her bachelor's degree in political science and history with a minor in human rights from the University of Chicago in 2010. During her studies, Gurmu interned with the Ethiopian Women Lawyers Association, focusing on sexual and reproductive health rights, poverty, and gender-based violence. At the University of Chicago, she received multiple honors, including the College Outstanding New Leader Award, Student Marshal honor, Maroon Key Society membership, Howell Murray Alumni Association Award, and Perry Herst Prize. She was also awarded honors for her senior thesis, Student Activism and the Transnational Black Liberation Movement: A Comparative Study of Black Student Movements in the United States and South Africa.

Gurmu later attended New York University School of Law for a Juris Doctor degree, graduating in 2015. At NYU Law, she received the International Law and Human Rights Fellowship, Kim Barry Graduation Prize, and NYU President's Service Award. She was also active in the Immigrant Rights Clinic, she worked with Defence for Children International in Sierra Leone (DCI-SL), drafting child protection-related trial briefs for the Supreme Court.

Gurmu stated "Working for DCI-SL put everything in perspective for me. I was exposed to the various ways that international human rights law directly affects the lives of African youth, and how a legal education can be used to advocate for substantive change".

== Career ==
=== Queer Black immigrant project (QBip) ===
In 2015, recognizing the challenges faced by LGBT African and Caribbean immigrants due to expanding anti-homosexuality legislation in Africa, Gurmu launched the Queer Black immigrant project (QBip) in New York City. Gurmu founded and coordinates QBip, providing legal and social support to LGBTQIA+ Black immigrants, including those living with HIV/AIDS. With the support of an Equal Justice Works fellowship, Gurmu provided legal representation for LGBT immigrants in asylum proceedings.

=== Black Alliance for Just Immigration (BAJI) ===
In 2018, with the support of Ayo Tometi, co-founder of the Black Lives Matter movement, Gurmu became the first Legal Director of the Black Alliance for Just Immigration (BAJI). As BAJI's first Legal Director, Gurmu oversees immigration legal services across U.S. offices and leads advocacy for Black migrants. She leads BAJI’s initiatives at the U.S.-Mexico border and in Southern Mexico. Gurmu has led key litigation, including FOIA cases on CBP's response to George Floyd protests and the treatment of Black immigrants in detention. Gurmu also spearheaded BAJI’s complaint against U.S. Immigration and Customs Enforcement for abusive practices. Through legal action, she challenges anti-Black immigration policies and advocates for the rights of Black immigrants and asylum seekers.

Gurmu has produced critical reports, including a report exploring anti-Black racism in Mexico titled “There Is A Target On Us.” She also produced BAJI’s Report to the Inter-American Commission on Human Rights following the 186th Period of Sessions Public Hearing on the Situation of human mobility from an ethnic-racial approach as well as the Report for the United Nations Special Rapporteur on contemporary forms of racism, racial discrimination, xenophobia and related intolerance on AI Uses and Implications for Racial Discrimination Against Black Migrants and Other Migrants of Color in U.S. Border and Immigration Enforcement.

== Recognitions and awards ==
- 2018: Named to Forbes 30 Under 30 in Law and Policy.
- 2019: OkayAfrica Top 100 Women honoree.
- 2019: OUTlaw Alumna of the Year award from NYU School of Law.
- 2019-2020: American Bar Association Young Lawyers Division Scholar.
- 2020: NYU Law LACA Under 40 Rising Stars.
- 2021 NYU Law Women of Color Collective Alumna of the Year.
- 2022: Recipient of the American Bar Association's Top 40 Young Lawyers on the Rise honoree.
- 2023: New York City Bar Association Annual Legal Services Award honoree.

== Publications ==
- "Groups Call for Transparency Regarding Abuse and Mistreatment of Black Immigrants in Detention". Immigration Impact. 2021-11-10.
- Bélanger, Jocelyn J.; Nisa, Claudia F.; Schumpe, Birga M.; Gurmu, Tsion; Williams, Michael J.; Putra, Idhamsyah Eka (2020-06-11). "Do Counter-Narratives Reduce Support for ISIS? Yes, but Not for Their Target Audience". Frontiers in Psychology. 11 1059. doi:10.3389/fpsyg.2020.01059. PMC 7325943. PMID 32655429.
- "Differences in State Sunshine Laws Can Threaten Transparency Around Immigration Detention and Enforcement". Immigration Impact. 2024-03-15.
- "Black Immigrants to the U.S. Deserve Equal Treatment". Bloomberg Law. 2022-03-11.
- THERE IS A TARGET ON US, The Impact of Anti-Black Racism on African Migrants at Mexico's Southern Border (PDF) (Report). 2021-01-01.
