= Mario Merola (lawyer) =

American politician (1922–1987)

- Mario Merola in an NBC interview

Bronx County District Attorney
- In office January 1, 1972 – October 27, 1987
- Preceded by: Burton B. Roberts
- Succeeded by: Paul T. Gentile

Personal details
- Born: February 1, 1922 Woodlawn Heights, The Bronx, New York City
- Died: October 27, 1987 (aged 65) The Bronx, New York City
- Resting place: Woodlawn Cemetery, The Bronx
- Party: Democratic Party
- Spouse: Tullia Palermo (m. 1949)
- Children: 3
- Education: New York University

Mario Merola (February 1, 1922 – October 27, 1987) was a New York City Councilman from 1964 to 1971 and the District Attorney of Bronx County, New York, from 1972 to 1987.

== Early life ==
Merola was born on February 1, 1922, to Italian immigrants in the Woodlawn Heights neighborhood of the Bronx. His father was a barber, while his mother was a garment industry worker. Merola went to public schools in the Bronx and graduated from New York University, where he played halfback on the college football team. He enlisted in the United States Army Air Corps in 1941 and became a combat navigator, flying a total of 55 missions into territory under occupation by Nazis in Europe. He eventually returned to New York and obtained his law degree from the New York University School of Law in 1948.

== Career ==
Merola's career in public service began in 1957, when he began working as an attorney for the New York City Department of Investigation. In May 1960, he was hired as an assistant district attorney for the Bronx County District Attorney's office, and prosecuted cases there until 1964.

=== New York City Council ===
He was elected as a Democrat to the New York City Council in November 1963, and was re-elected two times, representing the Bronx from January 1964 to December 1972.

=== Bronx County District Attorney ===
Merola was first elected Bronx County District Attorney in November 1972, and was re-elected three times, serving a total of 15 years until his death in October 1987. Merola had a reputation for political independence and outspokenness during his time as District Attorney. Merola was also able to attract bipartisan support during his election campaigns; he received the endorsement of both the Republican Party and the Liberal Party during his final campaign for re-election before he died.

Merola prosecuted a number of high-profile cases, the most notable one being the "Son of Sam" case, where he successfully convicted David Berkowitz for multiple homicides and got him a term of life in prison for his crimes. Another notable case during his tenure was the prosecution of former United States Secretary of Labor Raymond J. Donovan on charges that he stole $7.4 million from a subway construction project. Donovan, a Republican, was ultimately acquitted, and accused Merola of prosecuting him on political grounds. After the acquittal, Donovan famously asked, “Which office do I go to, to get my reputation back?”

Merola's office was responsible for the prosecution of a white police officer after the shooting death of Eleanor Bumpurs, a 66-year-old black woman with a history of mental illness, which occurred in the decedent's apartment. The officer was later acquitted.

== Personal life and death ==
Merola married Tulia Palermo in 1949, and they had three children together: Michael, Elizabeth and Marilou.

On October 27, 1987, Merola had a massive stroke, and passed out on the dining-room floor of his Woodlawn Heights home. He was taken to Our Lady of Mercy Medical Center, where he died of a cerebral hemorrhage, less than 12 hours after the stroke. He is buried in Woodlawn Cemetery in The Bronx.

== Legacy ==
At Merola's funeral, Mayor Edward Koch said that he intended to rename the Bronx County Courthouse as the Mario Merola Building, in his honor. It was done the following year, in February 1988.

Legal offices
Preceded by Burton B. Roberts	Bronx County District Attorney; 1973–1987	Succeeded by Paul Gentile
