= Francis W. Martin =

American lawyer

Bronx County District Attorney
- In office January 1, 1914 – December 31, 1920
- Preceded by: none
- Succeeded by: Edward J. Glennon

Personal details
- Born: October 3, 1878 Watervliet, New York, U.S.
- Died: June 1, 1947 (aged 68) The Bronx, New York, U.S.
- Resting place: Woodlawn Cemetery (Bronx, New York)
- Party: Democratic Party
- Spouse: Edith Rowan Martin
- Children: Edith Martin Burke, Francis W. Martin Jr.
- Parent(s): Dennis Martin and Catherine Martin née Keegan
- Education: New York Law School
- Occupation: lawyer, district attorney, judge
- Known for: Inaugural District Attorney of Bronx County

Francis W. Martin (October 3, 1878 – June 1, 1947) was the first ever district attorney in Bronx County, New York, United States, and a judge on the New York Supreme Court from 1921 until his death.

== Personal life and early career ==
Martin was born on October 3, 1878, to Dennis Martin and Catherine Martin née Keegan in Watervliet, New York, and grew up there. He graduated from New York Law School in 1902, and the following year moved to 2150 University Avenue in the Bronx, where he lived the remainder of his life. In 1905 he became an assistant corporation counsel for the New York City Law Department, and compiled such a good record in legal cases that when the Bronx was made a county, he received the backing of several bar groups, and more importantly, the Democratic party in the Bronx, for the office of Bronx County District Attorney. In the first election for county-wide positions in the Bronx on November 4, 1913, he won the district attorney election, and took office on January 1, 1914 the date the Bronx became a county. His initial salary was $10,000 per year.

== District attorney ==
Martin's record as district attorney was that of aggressive law enforcement, most notably against organized crime. In 1920, he stepped down from the district attorney's office to run for a seat as a judge on the New York State Supreme Court, and won. In 1923, he was named to the Appellate Division by Governor Al Smith, and in 1934 he was re-elected as a justice. In 1935, he was appointed as presiding justice of the Appellate Division by Governor Herbert H. Lehman. Martin also served as a state delegate to the New York Constitutional Conventions of 1915 and 1938.

== Death ==
Martin died unexpectedly at home on June 1, 1947, and is buried in Woodlawn Cemetery in the Bronx.

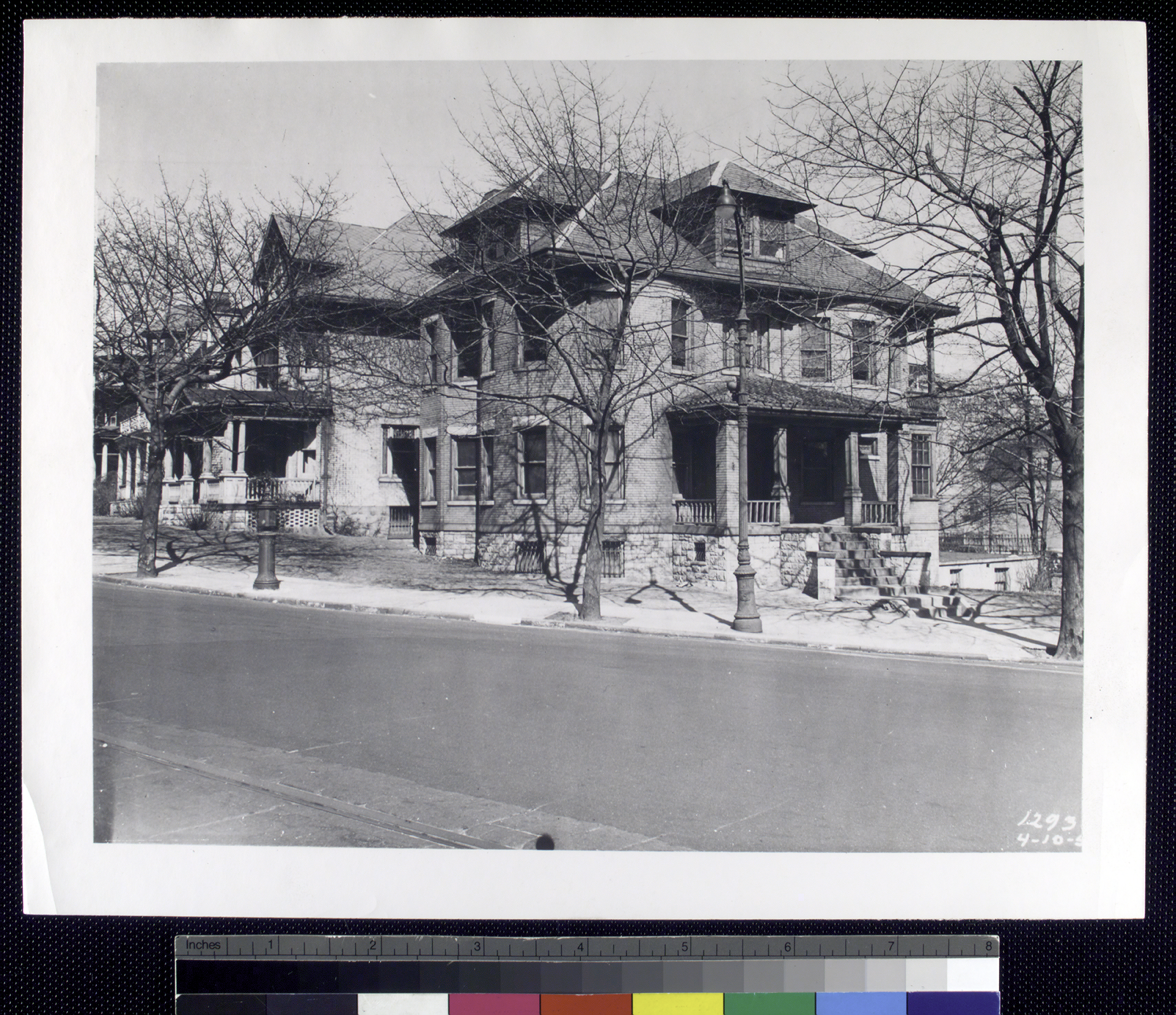
Lifelong home of Francis W. Martin before being demolished and replaced by a library.

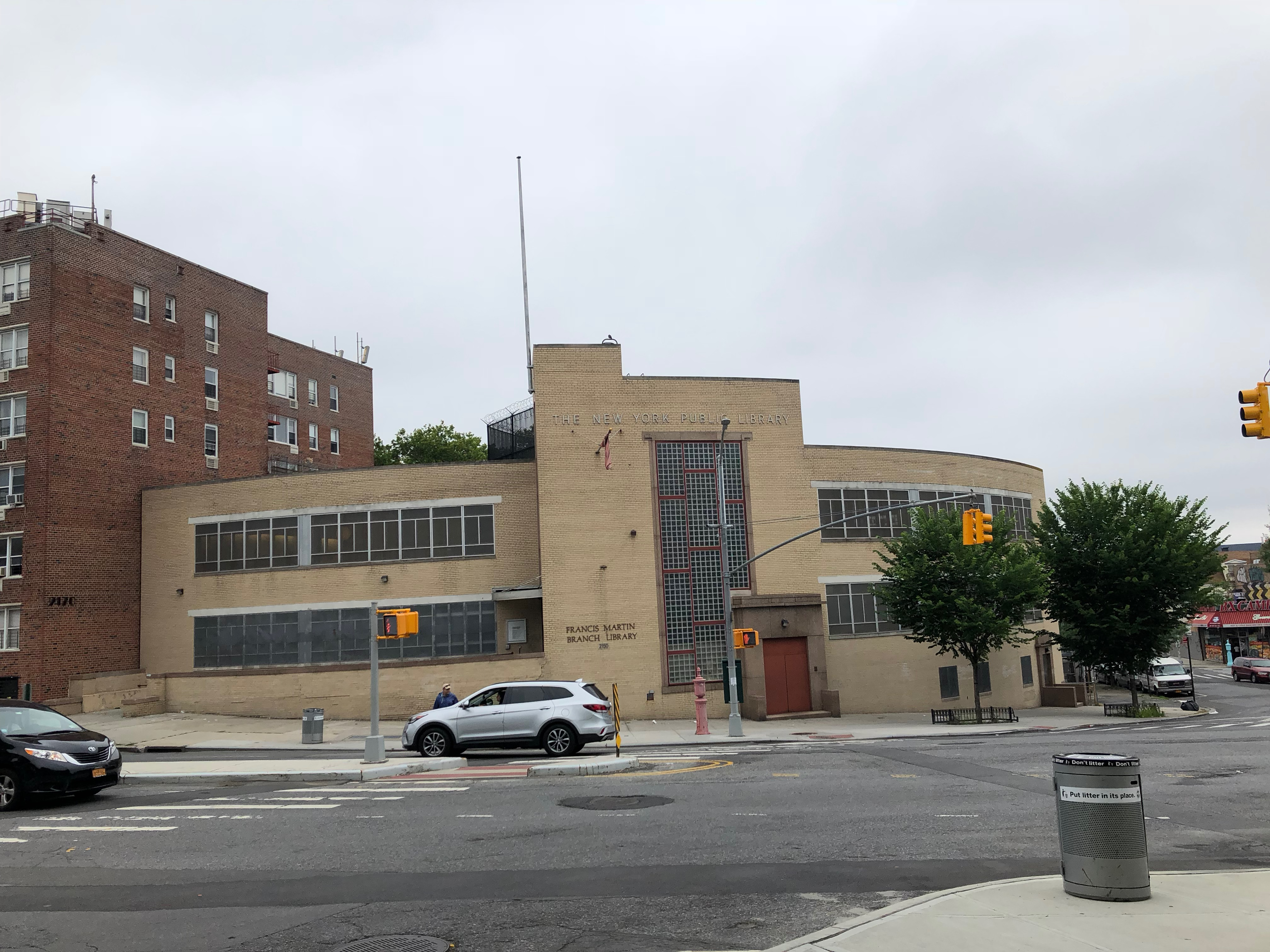
NYPL Bronx Francis W. Martin Branch Library built on the site of Francis W. Martin's former home.

Legal offices
Preceded by office created	Bronx County District Attorney; 1914–1920	Succeeded by Edward J. Glennon
