= Burton B. Roberts =

American judge

Bronx County District Attorney
- Preceded by: Isidore Dollinger
- Succeeded by: Mario Merola

Bronx County District Attorney (acting)
- In office September 18, 1968 – November 7, 1968

Bronx County District Attorney
- In office November 7, 1968 – December 31, 1972

Personal details
- Born: Burton Bennett Roberts; July 25, 1922 Manhattan, New York City, U.S.
- Died: October 24, 2010 (aged 88) The Bronx, New York, U.S.
- Party: Democratic
- Education: New York University; Cornell University

Burton Bennett Roberts (July 25, 1922 – October 24, 2010) was an American judge. He served as Bronx district attorney before his election as a judge, later serving as the chief administrative judge for the New York Supreme Court in the Bronx until his retirement in 1998 after 25 years on the bench. His no-nonsense manner as a prosecutor and in court made him the model for the character Myron Kovitsky in the 1987 book The Bonfire of the Vanities by Tom Wolfe.

== Early life and education ==
Roberts was born on July 25, 1922, in Washington Heights, Manhattan, New York City and graduated from DeWitt Clinton High School. He earned his undergraduate degree in 1943 at New York University. He enlisted in the United States Army during World War II, where he served in the European Theater and earned the Bronze Star Medal for his actions in rescuing fellow soldiers who had been injured, while he was still exposed to enemy fire. He became a corporal.

After completing his military service, Roberts earned his law degree from the New York University School of Law in 1949 and was awarded a Master of Laws in 1953 from Cornell Law School.

== Legal career ==
Starting in 1949, he began his legal career as an assistant prosecutor to Frank Hogan the New York County District Attorney, which was where he started using his voice, described as being "a few decibels below the roar of a jet engine", prosecuting petty criminals and corrupt politicians alike. In 1966 he was lured away from Manhattan to become the chief assistant to Bronx County District Attorney Isidore Dollinger, and became acting district attorney in 1967 when Dollinger ran for a judicial seat. He became Bronx County District Attorney in 1968 with bipartisan support and saw a near tripling in the number of prosecutors in his office.

He was elected to a 14-year term as a Supreme Court Justice in 1973 with multi-partisan support and would rule his courtroom with an iron fist, using his stentorian voice to chide prosecutors, defense attorneys and even witnesses as he saw fit. He presided over the case involving the 1990 Happy Land fire, in which 87 people were killed at an unlicensed social club. In remarks made before he sentenced the convicted arsonist to 25 years in jail, Roberts pointed out that the club had been visited months before the fire and had been ordered closed after multiple fire code violations were discovered, saying "there are many to be blamed," for the tragic results of the fire "not just Julio Gonzalez". The Happy Land fire trial was a model for the way he ran his courtroom, allowing "No histrionics. No emotion run amok." He would feel free to interrupt any lawyer or witness who strayed off the topic or rambled. Roberts later oversaw negotiations with families of the victims that led to a settlement of $15.8 million in 1995.

With the relative safety of an elected term more than a decade long, Roberts felt free to speak with the press about his opposition to mandatory sentencing law that limited judicial discretion and to the death penalty and to express his firm belief in the independence of the judiciary. He frequently spoke out against what he saw as outside political interference with his rulings, calling criticism of the low bail he set for an accused cop killer by Mayor of New York City Rudy Giuliani and New York Governor George Pataki to be "the bleatings of public officials who possibly are seeking political advantage". He was ultimately chosen as the administrative judge in charge of criminal and civil trial courts in the county, serving in that role for more than a decade before his retirement from the bench in 1998.

Immortalized in The Bonfire of the Vanities as judge Myron Kovitsky, a character based on Roberts, he was one of the few sympathetic characters in the book, one who would not be swayed by prosecutors or the press. Wolfe dedicated the book to Roberts and one of his assistants, calling Roberts "one of the great figures in New York" and considered him "the greatest single figure I've run into". In the 1990 film adaptation of the book starring Tom Hanks, Bruce Willis and Melanie Griffith, the role of the judge was renamed to Leonard White and was played by Morgan Freeman, who is Black, after director Brian De Palma said he "didn't want to racially polarize" the movie by having "a white judge talking morality to a basically black audience."

Upon retirement, he entered private practice with the politically connected firm of Fischbein Badillo Wagner Harding. He said he worked for "a very fine firm with very fine people", but regretted not serving as a judge, saying "I enjoyed the other life more. I always felt I could do things for more people in public life". One of the first cases he took on in private practice involved defending one of the police officers charged in the shooting death of Amadou Diallo, in which he was able to convince the judge to change the venue of the case to Albany, arguing that his client could not get a fair trial in the Bronx.

== Death ==
Roberts died of respiratory failure at the age of 88 on October 24, 2010, at the Hebrew Home for the Aged in Riverdale, the Bronx where he had resided for the year before his death. He was survived by his wife, the former Gerhild Hammer, whom he married in 1982 after decades of bachelorhood.

Legal offices
Preceded by Isidore Dollinger	Bronx County District Attorney; 1968–1972	Succeeded by Mario Merola
