= Bronx County District Attorney =

Highest judicial officer of the county

District Attorney of Bronx County

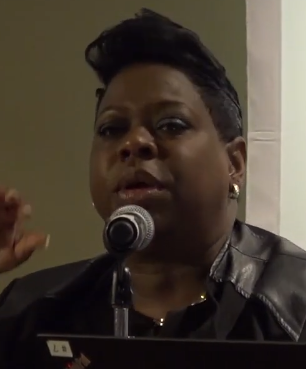
- Incumbent; Darcel Clark since January 1, 2016
- Type: District Attorney
- Member of: District Attorneys Association of the State of New York
- Term length: Four years
- Formation: January 1, 1914
- First holder: Francis W. Martin
- Deputy: Chief Assistant District Attorney, Derek Lynton
- Website: http://bronxda.nyc.gov

The Bronx County District Attorney is the elected district attorney for Bronx County, which is coterminous with the Borough of the Bronx, in New York City. The office is responsible for the prosecution of violations of New York state laws. (Federal law in the Bronx is prosecuted by the U.S. Attorney for the Southern District of New York). The current Bronx County District Attorney is Darcel Clark.

== History ==
In a legislative act of February 12, 1796, New York State was divided into seven districts, each with an Assistant Attorney General, except for New York County, where Attorney General Josiah Ogden Hoffman prosecuted personally until 1801.

The First District included Kings, Queens, Richmond, Suffolk, and Westchester counties. At that time, Westchester also included present-day Bronx County, and Queens County included much of present-day Nassau County. The Assistant Attorney General was renamed District Attorney and New York County was added to the First District on April 4, 1801. Westchester was separated from the First District and became part of the Eleventh District with Rockland and Putnam counties on April 12, 1813, and New York County became the Twelfth District on March 24, 1815. By 1818, New York State had 13 districts, which were divided so that each of the 50 county then in existence became its own district on April 21, 1818.

Until 1822, the district attorney was appointed by the Council of Appointment, and held the office "during the Council's pleasure", meaning that there was no defined term of office. Under the provisions of the New York State Constitution of 1821, district attorneys were appointed to three-year terms by their County Court, and under the provisions of the Constitution of 1846, the office became elective by popular ballot for a three-year term beginning January 1 and ending December 31. Vacancies were filled by the Governor of New York until a successor was elected to a full term at the next annual election, and acting district attorneys were appointed by Courts of General Sessions pending the governor's action.

In 1874, New York City annexed the West Bronx into New York County. New York County was further expanded in 1895 to include all of today's New York and Bronx Counties. The Consolidation Charter of 1896 extended the term of incumbent district attorney John R. Fellows, who had been elected in 1893 to a three-year term from January 1, 1894 to December 31, 1896, by an extra year. Since the city elections of 1897, the New York and Bronx County District Attorneys' terms have coincided with the Mayor's terms and have been four years, except for 1901 to 1905, when two mayors served two-year terms. In case of a vacancy, a special election is held for the remainder of the term.

For the list of district attorneys for the area covering Bronx County prior to its creation from New York County, see Werner (p. 553, 554, and 563) for 1801 to 1874, both Werner (p. 563) and New York County District Attorney from 1874 to 1895, and New York County District Attorney for 1895 to 1913. When Bronx County was created on January 1, 1914, Francis W. Martin, who won the election in November 1913 in anticipation of its formation, became district attorney. His initial salary was $10,000.

== List of Bronx County District Attorneys ==
District Attorney	Dates in office	Party	Notes
Francis W. Martin	January 1, 1914 – December 31, 1920	Democratic	elected to two four-year terms; resigned upon election as a New York State Supreme Court justice
Edward J. Glennon	January 1, 1921 – December 31, 1921 (interim); January 1, 1922 – December 31, 1923 (elected)	Democratic	appointed by Governor Al Smith; elected to a four-year term; resigned to become a New York State Supreme Court justice
John E. McGeehan	January 1, 1924 – December 31, 1925 (interim); January 1, 1926 – December 24, 1929 (elected)	Democratic	appointed by Governor Al Smith; elected to the remainder of Glennon's term; elected to a four-year term; resigned to become a New York State Supreme Court justice
Charles B. McLaughlin	December 24, 1929 – March 17, 1933	Democratic	elected to a four-year term; resigned to become a New York State Supreme Court justice
Samuel J. Foley	March 22, 1933 – December 31, 1933 (interim); January 1, 1934 – December 29, 1949 (elected)	Democratic	appointed by Governor Herbert Lehman; ran on the Democratic and Recovery Party lines in his first election, but had been a Democrat; elected to four four-year terms; ran for a Bronx County Court judgeship in November 1949, and won
George B. DeLuca	January 1, 1950 – December 31, 1954	Democratic	elected to two four-year terms; resigned upon taking office as Lieutenant Governor of New York
Daniel V. Sullivan	January 1, 1955 – December 31, 1955 (interim); January 1, 1956 – December 31, 1959 (elected)	Democratic	appointed by Governor Averell Harriman when DeLuca became his Lieutenant Governor; elected to a four-year term; retired, did not seek renomination
Isidore Dollinger	January 1, 1960 – September 18, 1968	Democratic	elected to three four-year terms; resigned to accept a nomination to run for a New York State Supreme Court judge position
Burton B. Roberts	September 18, 1968 – November 7, 1968 (acting); November 7, 1968 – December 31, 1968 (interim); January 1, 1969 – September 16, 1972 (elected); September 16, 1972 – December 31, 1972 (interim)	Democratic, Republican, Liberal	became acting district attorney upon Dollinger's resignation; appointed by Governor Nelson Rockefeller; nominated by three Bronx County parties' committees for his initial election, but had been a Democrat; elected to the remainder of Dollinger's term; elected to a four-year term; resigned to accept a nomination to run for a New York State Supreme Court judge position but was re-appointed by Rockefeller for continuity of investigations until he was succeeded
Mario Merola	January 1, 1973 – October 27, 1987	Democratic, Republican, Liberal, Conservative	nominated by four Bronx County parties' committees for his initial election to the remainder of Roberts' term, but had been a Democrat; elected to the remainder of Roberts' term; elected to four four-year terms including one after he died shortly before election day; died in office
Paul T. Gentile	October 27, 1987 – December 10, 1987 (acting); December 10, 1987 – December 31, 1988 (interim)	Democratic	became acting district attorney after Merola's unexpected death; appointed by Governor Mario Cuomo to a one-year term; withdrew from the primary election race
Robert T. Johnson	January 1, 1989 – December 31, 2015	Democratic, Liberal, Conservative	won his initial election for the remainder of Merola's term running on three party lines and unopposed, but had been a Democrat; elected to six four-year terms; elected a justice of the New York Supreme Court
Darcel D. Clark	January 1, 2016 – current	Democratic	nominated by the Bronx Democratic County Committee to replace Johnson on the primary ballot and elected to a four-year term; re-elected to two four-year terms
