= John E. McGeehan =

American judge

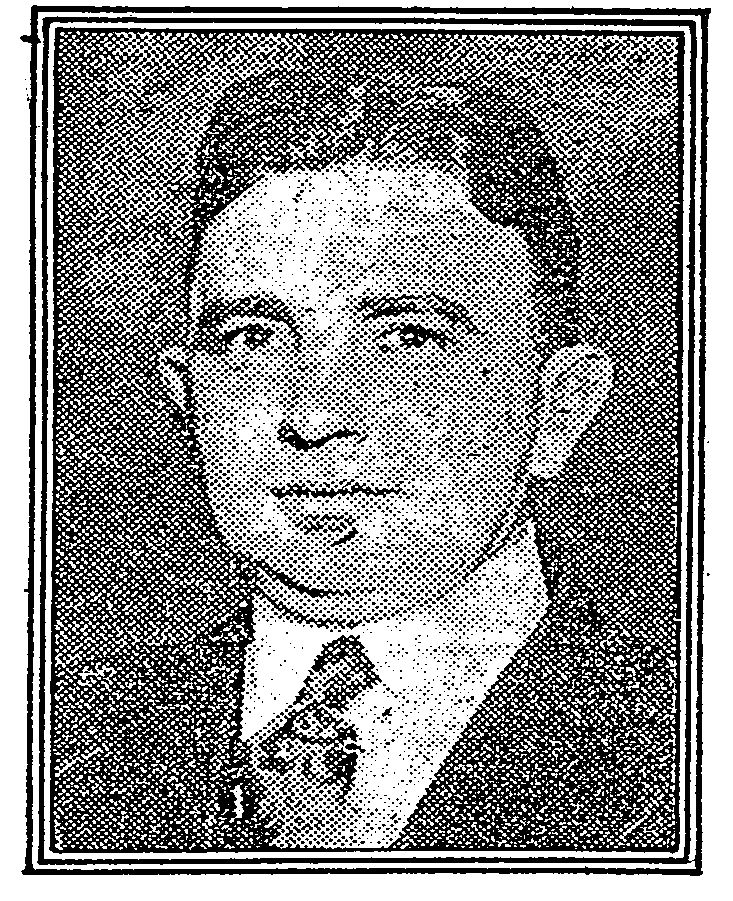
- McGeehan in 1925

Bronx County District Attorney
- In office January 1, 1924 – December 24, 1929
- Preceded by: Edward J. Glennon
- Succeeded by: Charles B. McLaughlin

Personal details
- Born: November 17, 1880 Manhattan, New York, US
- Died: May 17, 1968 (aged 87) Manhattan, New York, US
- Resting place: Saint Raymond's Cemetery, Bronx, New York
- Party: Democratic Party
- Spouse: Rose Beatrice Coughlin
- Education: Fordham Law School
- Occupation: Lawyer, district attorney, judge

John E. McGeehan (1880–1968) was a lawyer, district attorney, and judge in New York City from 1917 to 1950.

McGeehan was born November 17, 1880, on the Lower East Side in Manhattan to Daniel McGeehan of Wisconsin and Ellen Vaughan of Ireland. He graduated from Fordham Law School in 1912, and was appointed a deputy commissioner of the New York City Water Department by Mayor John Purroy Mitchel in 1914. In 1917, Mitchel appointed McGeehan as a city magistrate, and in 1923, McGeehan was elected as a city court judge. The next year, he was elected to the office of Bronx County District Attorney, a post he held until 1929, when he was elected as a New York State Supreme Court justice.

During his tenure as a justice, he presided over The Bertrand Russell Case and barred him from serving as a professor at the City College of New York, stating that his appointment would "adversely affect public health, safety, and morals." "It is safe to say that [McGeehan] will go down in history as a minor inquisitor who used his one brief moment in the limelight to besmirch and injure a great and honest man."

After reaching mandatory retirement age and stepping down from the court bench in 1950, he was appointed as a referee in the New York Supreme Court, Appellate Division. In 1960, he was appointed by federal judge Sylvester J. Ryan of the United States District Court for the Southern District of New York as overseer for the $28 million distributed annually by the American Society of Composers, Authors and Publishers, which he continued to do until his death.

He died in Manhattan on May 17, 1968, and is buried in Saint Raymond's Cemetery in the Bronx, New York.

Legal offices
Preceded by Edward J. Glennon	Bronx County District Attorney; 1924–1929	Succeeded by Charles B. McLaughlin
