= Edward J. Glennon =

American judge

Bronx County District Attorney
- In office January 1, 1921 – December 31, 1923
- Preceded by: Francis W. Martin
- Succeeded by: John E. McGeehan

Personal details
- Born: November 4, 1884 Littleton, New Jersey
- Died: November 6, 1956 (aged 72) The Bronx, New York City
- Resting place: Rural Cemetery, White Plains, New York
- Party: Democratic Party
- Spouse: Gertrude Glennon
- Children: Gertrude Bontecou, Dorothy Haggerty, Janet Glennon, Edith Glennon
- Education: Fordham University, New York Law School
- Occupation: Lawyer, district attorney, judge

Edward J. Glennon (November 4, 1884 – September 6, 1956) was the Bronx County District Attorney from 1920 to 1923, and a justice of the New York State Supreme Court in 1920 and from 1924 to 1954.

== Early life ==
Glennon was born in Littleton, near Morristown, New Jersey. His family moved to the Bronx and he attended St. John's Preparatory School (now Fordham Preparatory School) before attending Fordham University, where he was captain of the football team and from which he graduated in 1905.

== Professional career ==
After graduation from New York Law School, Glennon spent several years in the private practice of law while also participating in Bronx politics. He was friends with Arthur H. Murphy, the inaugural leader of the Bronx County Democratic Party, and obtained an appointment as a deputy district attorney at an annual salary of $3,000 when the Bronx became a county in 1914. When John Hylan was elected Mayor of New York City in 1918, he appointed Glennon as an assistant city chamberlain, and a year later, Public Service Commissioner Lewis Nixon appointed him a deputy public service commissioner. In April 1920, New York Governor Al Smith gave Glennon's career a further boost by appointing him as a judge on the New York State Supreme Court, but Tammany Hall refused to give him a position on the Democratic ticket to run for a full term that November. However, Francis W. Martin, the inaugural Bronx County District Attorney, was running for one of the judgeship positions, and Glennon was acceptable to Tammany as district attorney, so he became Smith's appointment to replace Martin as district attorney, thereby changing places with Martin.

Glennon ran for the district attorney office as a Democrat in the election of November 1921, and won the office in his own right. In 1923 he ran for a judicial position on the New York State Supreme Court, and won a 14-year term. In 1933 Glennon was appointed to the Appellate Division, and he had the nominations of both the Democratic and Republican Party tickets when he ran for re-election in 1937.

Glennon retired in December 1954, after reaching the mandatory retirement age of 70. He died at Union Hospital in the Bronx, near where he had lived at 276 Bedford Park Boulevard. and is buried in Rural Cemetery in White Plains, New York.

Legal offices
Preceded by Francis W. Martin	Bronx County District Attorney; 1914–1920	Succeeded by John E. McGeehan
