= Dornbush =

Dornbush is a surname. Notable people with the surname include:

- K. Terry Dornbush (1933-2024), United States Ambassador to the Netherlands
- Richard Dornbush (born 1991), American figure skater
