= Peter C. Clapman =

American investment chief executive (1936–2021)

Peter C. Clapman (March 11, 1936 – February 9, 2021) was an American investment chief executive.

== Life and career ==
He was a graduate of Princeton University, and earned a J.D. degree from Harvard Law School.

Clapman was the CEO of Governance for Owners USA Inc, and previously served as Senior Vice President & Chief Counsel for TIAA-CREF for 32 years. He served on multiple boards and committees, including the Committee on Capital Markets Regulation, the AARP Mutual Funds Board of Trustees, the Board of Directors at iPass and the Conference of Fund Leaders; a joint initiative of the Yale Center and Mutual Fund Directors Forum.

Clapman was elected a member of the American Law Institute in 1993.

He was the 2005 recipient of The International Corporate Governance Network Award for his achievements in corporate governance and his contributions to improve global corporate governance standards.

Clapman died from complications of COVID-19 at the Suburban Hospital in Bethesda on February 9, 2021, amidst the COVID-19 pandemic in Maryland. He was 84.
