= Harold M. Williams =

American businessman and philanthropist

U.S. Securities and Exchange Commission Chair
- In office April 18, 1977 – March 1, 1981
- President: Jimmy Carter; Ronald Reagan
- Preceded by: Roderick M. Hills
- Succeeded by: John S.R. Shad

Harold Marvin Williams (January 5, 1928 - July 30, 2017) served as chairman of U.S. Securities and Exchange Commission between 1977 and 1981. Williams was engaged in extensive public service and support of arts and education.

== UCLA ==
When Williams returned to UCLA as the dean of the Graduate School of Management in 1970, it had a number of renowned faculty but yet did not enjoy a reputation as a top business school. During Williams's tenure that lasted until 1977, the GSM became the only public university business school ranked in the top ten in the US.

== J. Paul Getty Trust ==
Williams became president and chief executive officer (CEO) of the J. Paul Getty Museum in 1981. When the J. Paul Getty Trust was established in 1983, Williams also became the first president and CEO of the Trust. During his tenure from 1981 to 1998, his major accomplishment was "presid[ing] over the planning and construction of the Getty Center", and expanding the center's scope to include art research, education, and preservation. By the time Williams announced his retirement in 1996, the Trust's endowment had risen from $1.2 billion to almost $4 billion. He was succeeded by Barry Munitz in 1998.

== Milestones ==
- B.A., University of California, Los Angeles, 1946
- J.D., Harvard University, 1949
- President, Hunt Foods and Industries (1968–1969) and Hunt-Wesson Foods, Inc. (1962–1968)
- Chairman of the Board, Norton Simon (1969–1970)
- Dean and Professor, Graduate School of Management, University of California, Los Angeles (1970–1977)
- Co-Chairman, Public Commission on Los Angeles County Government (1974–1977)
- Chairman, U.S. Securities and Exchange Commission (1977–1981)
- Member, Board of Regents, University of California (1982–1994)
- President of the J. Paul Getty Trust (1981–1998).
- In charge of the creation of the Getty Center in Los Angeles
- Member, President's Committee on the Arts and Humanities (appointed by President Clinton) (1993–Present)
- Director, The California Endowment (1996–Present); Los Angeles Annenberg Metropolitan
- Public Policy Institute of California (1994–Present)
- Co-Chair, California Citizens Commission on Higher Education (1996–Present)
- Chair, Committee for Effective School Governance (1998–Present)

Government offices
Preceded by Roderick M. Hills	Securities and Exchange Commission Chair; 1977 – 1981	Succeeded by John S.R. Shad
