= Barry Munitz =

American academic administrator and business executive (born 1941)

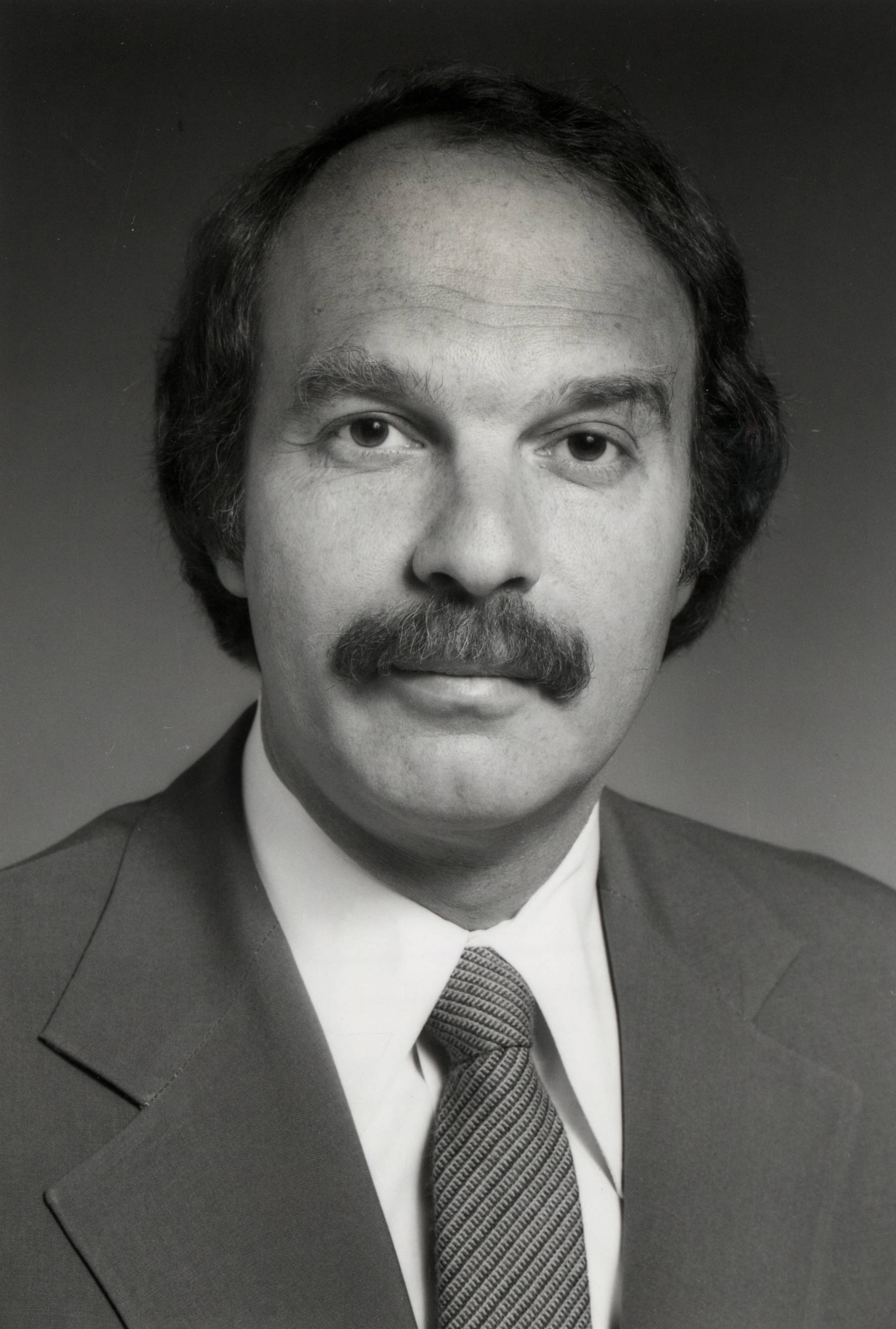

5th Chancellor of California State University
- In office 1991–1998
- Preceded by: Ellis E. McCune
- Succeeded by: Charles B. Reed

President of the University of Houston
- In office 1977–1982
- Preceded by: Philip Guthrie Hoffman
- Succeeded by: Richard L. Van Horn

Personal details
- Born: Barry Allen Munitz; July 26, 1941 (age 85) New York City, U.S.
- Education: Brooklyn College (BA); Princeton University (MA, PhD)

Barry Allen Munitz (born July 26, 1941) has been a senior administrator at the University of Illinois and the University of Houston, a business executive at Maxxam, Inc., chancellor of the California State University system, and chief executive officer of the world's wealthiest art institution, the J. Paul Getty Trust. He is on the Board of Selectors of Jefferson Awards for Public Service.

== Early life and education ==
Munitz was born and raised in Brooklyn, the son of parents from Eastern Europe. Munitz earned a B.A. degree in classics and comparative literature at Brooklyn College in 1963. He earned M.A. and Ph. D. degrees in comparative literature from Princeton University.

== Career ==
Munitz's first teaching job was at the University of California, Berkeley from 1966 to 1968, where he also worked as a part-time assistant to the UC system president, Clark Kerr. When Kerr resigned and became chairman of the Carnegie Commission on Higher Education in 1968, he brought along Munitz as a staff associate. In 1970 Munitz moved to the University of Illinois, and was soon promoted to vice president for academic affairs at the University of Illinois, Chicago from 1972 to 1976.

=== University of Houston (1977–1982) ===
When Philip G. Hoffman resigned as president of the University of Houston to become the first chancellor of the newly created University of Houston System, the university was looking for someone who could fill the shoes of its popular leader from 1962 to 1977. They turned to 35-year-old "wunderkind" Barry Munitz—then serving as vice-president and dean of faculties in the system office—to be the new president of the University of Houston. It was anticipated that Munitz could work with the business community to build up the University's endowment. After several years, Munitz's cultivating the business community led to an offer to join a local corporation, Maxxam, Inc., that was busy acquiring other companies in leveraged buyouts.

=== Maxxam, Inc. (1982–1991) ===
Charles Hurwitz, Maxxam's president, hired Munitz as vice president in 1982. Munitz was active with Maxxam's related companies, including serving as chair of the executive committee of United Savings Association of Texas (USAT), and assisted Hurwitz with his 1985 take-over of Pacific Lumber Company, with its old-growth redwoods, including Headwaters Forest in northern California. USAT became the fifth-largest savings and loan failure at a cost to the public of $1.6 billion.

=== California State University (1991–1998) ===
In 1991, Munitz was selected as chancellor of the 23-campus California State University, the country's largest senior system of public higher education. He introduced management practices from the corporate world, including tying a portion of salary increases for faculty to performance reviews, evaluating campus presidents on their success in fund-raising from the private sector, and mandating a common financial and data management system for all campuses.

=== J. Paul Getty Trust (1998–2006) ===
In 1997, Munitz was named the president and CEO of the J. Paul Getty Trust, which oversees the Getty Center in Los Angeles, the Getty Villa in Pacific Palisades, California, the Getty Foundation, the Getty Research Institute, and the Getty Conservation Institute. He began work in January 1998, succeeding Harold M. Williams, the first president of the Getty Trust, who oversaw construction of the $1 billion Getty Center designed by architect Richard Meier. With an endowment of $4.2 billion, the Getty Trust is the wealthiest art institution in the world. Early in his tenure, Munitz reorganized the Getty Trust, closing two of the institution's six programs—the Getty Information Institute and the Getty Education Institute. To deal with long-run financial issues, he sought to cultivate relationships with donors and corporate partners. His leadership became increasingly controversial as the Getty Trust was embroiled in numerous controversies relating to the provenance of various antiquities in the Getty Museum's collections and Munitz' expense account. In the midst of an investigation by the California Attorney General, Munitz resigned in 2006 and was forced to "forgo his severance package of more than $2 million, and reimburse the Getty Trust for $250,000 after alleged improprieties including lavish expense account spending."

=== post-Getty ===
After leaving the Getty Trust, Munitz returned to the California State University as a Trustee Professor, based at California State University, Los Angeles.

Munitz has served on the Princeton University Board of Trustees, and chaired the American Council on Education and the California Education Roundtable. He is also a director of Sallie Mae.

== Awards ==
In 1999, Munitz was awarded an honorary Doctor of Humane Letters (L.H.D.) degree from Whittier College. In 2001, he received an honorary Doctor of Humane Letters from the University of Southern California.
