= David Sturtevant Ruder =

American lawyer (1929–2020)

23rd Chairman of the Securities and Exchange Commission
- In office August 7, 1987 – September 30, 1989
- President: Ronald W. Reagan; George H.W Bush
- Preceded by: John S.R. Shad
- Succeeded by: Richard C. Breeden

Personal details
- Born: May 25, 1929 Wausau, Wisconsin, U.S.
- Died: February 15, 2020 (aged 90)
- Party: Independent
- Education: Williams College; University of Wisconsin, Madison

David Sturtevant Ruder (May 25, 1929 – February 15, 2020) was a U.S. scholar and civil servant, one of the first securities law professors. He was the dean of the Northwestern University School of Law in 1977–1985. In 1987–1989, he served as the Chair of the Securities and Exchange Commission.

== Biography ==
=== Education and early career ===
David Sturtevant Ruder was born in 1929 in Wausau, Wisconsin. His father was also a lawyer. Ruder received a bachelor's degree cum laude in 1951 from Williams College in Massachusetts. After college, he was drafted to the U.S. Army and served until 1954, rising to the rank of First Lieutenant. In the Army, he was assigned to administrative duties at the Central Intelligence Agency. Ruder confessed that he had viewed his own CIA file, finding there a remark that he was unsuited for undercover jobs as "too honest".

In 1957, he graduated with honours from the University of Wisconsin Law School, where he was also honoured with the Salmon W. Dalberg Prize as the outstanding student.

Upon graduation, in 1957 he started working at the Quarles & Brady law firm in Milwaukee. Four years later, he moved to Chicago to take up a post as an assistant professor at Northwestern University School of Law. There he focused on securities law, teaching courses on insider trading, enforcement, tender offers, and other regulatory topics. Ruder practically became one of the very first securities law professors. In 1971-1976, whilst teaching at Northwestern, he also served as a counsel to the Chicago law firm of Schiff, Hardin & Waite. In 1977, he was appointed dean and held that post until 1985.

Ruder helped other law professors achieve higher salaries. Richard Speidel recalled that Ruder sent him 'a seven-page, single-spaced letter explaining why he should give up his post as dean at Boston University Law School' and come to teach at Northwestern. Ruder completed a $25 mln law school campaign and constructed the school's Arthur Rubloff Building. He also managed to persuade the American Bar Association to move its headquarters into the Rubloff Building.

In 1971, he also was a visiting professor at the University of Pennsylvania Law School, and a faculty member at the Salzburg Seminar in American Studies in 1976.

=== SEC chairmanship ===
On 7 August 1987, aged 58, he was sworn in as the 23rd Chairman of the U.S. Securities and Exchange Commission by Associate Justice Antonin Scalia. AHe was the second choice for the position, and some had doubts as to whether he would be "aggressive enough" to effectively fight fraud. During his tenure, Black Monday, when on 19 October 1987 stock market crashed and the Dow Jones Industrial Average plunged 22.6%. According to Rick Ketchum, who then headed the SEC's market-regulation division, Ruder performed well under these extreme conditions, he helped to stabilize the market by encouraging companies to buy back shares.

Ruder effectively ended the period of "the rush to deregulation" at the Agency and shifted the balance of power at the Commission away from the Reagan-espoused "self-correcting markets" doctrine. Over the next year, his agency worked to build the emergency response architecture that introduced coordinated circuit breakers and related market safeguards. His legislative agenda was extensive and, on the whole, aimed at introducing stricter regulation. Ruder helped with a program aimed at eliminating penny stock fraud, he pushed for stricter regulation of shadowy brokers that offered "penny stocks" to inexperienced investors. He also proposed adopting advertising rules for mutual funds and amending proxy and shareholder rules. Ruder consistently resisted taking ideological positions and many of his initiatives were strongly opposed by the futures industry, members of Congress and on some occasions even SEC commissioners Edward Fleischman and Joseph Grundfest.

An important contribution by Ruder was his creation of IOSCO, common disclosure standards, co-operation agreements, international accounting convergence, and the extraterritorial scope of U.S. securities law into chair-level priorities.

Ruder resigned in September 1989 and returned to teaching law at Northwestern.

=== Other endeavours ===
Ruder authored numerous articles on corporate and securities law matters. He was also very active in bar association activities and contributed to many initiatives. Ruder served on numerous boards, including International Accounting Standards Committee Foundation; he testified before Congress 45 times and made more than 600 speeches and public appearances. He actively promoted international cooperation and coordination between securities regulators.

Ruder practiced with the Chicago-based law firm Baker & McKenzie in 1994-1999, and served on the NASD Board of Governors from 1990 to 1993.

He became the William W. Gurley Memorial Professor of Law Emeritus at Northwestern University School of Law on 1 September 2005.

Ruder co-founded and served as chairman of the Mutual Fund Directors Forum, an organization providing education to independent directors of mutual funds, from 2002 to 2010 and was the organization's chairman emeritus.

On May 14, 2008, Ruder, together with two other former SEC chairmen, William Donaldson and Arthur Levitt, endorsed Barack Obama's candidacy for President.

=== Awards and recognition ===
Ruder received an honorary Doctor of Laws in 2002 from the University of Wisconsin–Madison.

Ruder was honoured with the Institutional Investor Mutual Fund Industry Lifetime Achievement Award in 2009. In 2016, he joined the American College of Corporate Governance as an honorary fellow.

He taught at Northwestern until 2017 and passed away on 15 February 2020.

== Personal life ==
Ruder had four children from two earlier marriages, two stepchildren with his third wife, Susan Small Ruder, and nine grandchildren. He was a enjoyed gold, with a reported handicap of 22.

== Literature ==
- Annual Report of the Securities and Exchange Commission. United States Securities and Exchange Commission. 1988. pp. 99–100.
- Ruder, David S. (2004). "An SEC Chairman's Recollection" (PDF). Securities and Exchange Commission Historical Society Roundtable of SEC Chairmen.

Government offices
| Preceded by John S.R. Shad | Securities and Exchange Commission Chair; 1987 – 1989 | Succeeded by Richard C. Breeden |
