= Cynthia P. Schneider =

American diplomat and educator

61st United States Ambassador to the Netherlands
- In office June 29, 1998 – June 17, 2001
- President: Bill Clinton
- Preceded by: K. Terry Dornbush
- Succeeded by: Clifford Sobel

Personal details
- Born: Pennsylvania, United States
- Spouse: Thomas J. Schneider
- Children: 2
- Education: Harvard University

Cynthia Perrin Schneider is an American diplomat and educator from Pennsylvania. She was the 61st United States Ambassador to the Netherlands from June 29, 1998 to June 17, 2001.

She currently serves as a Distinguished Professor in the Practice of Diplomacy in the School of Foreign Service at Georgetown University, where she co-directs the Laboratory for Global Performance and Politics with playwright and theater director Derek Goldman.

== Early life and education ==
Cynthia Perrin Schneider studied Fine Arts at Harvard University, where she received her bachelor's degree in 1977 and her doctorate in 1984.

== Career ==
Schneider started her professional career in 1980 as an assistant curator of European paintings at the Museum of Fine Arts in Boston, where she stayed until 1984.

Schneider then moved to Georgetown University, where she served as Associate Professor of Art History from 1984-2005. In this position, she was involved with several courses, publications, and exhibitions of Baroque and Renaissance art, with a specialization in Dutch art of the seventeenth century and Rembrandt.

== Ambassadorship ==
In 1998, Schneider joined the Department of State as the Ambassador for the United States of America to the Kingdom of the Netherlands. She was the 61st United States Ambassador to the Netherlands from June 29, 1998 to June 17, 2001.

Schneider coordinated numerous events during her ambassadorship. Her field of responsibility included initiatives in public and cultural diplomacy, biotechnology, cyber security, military affairs, and education, as well as work in international justice and the environment. Notable projects undertaken by Schneider during her ambassadorship include an oral history of World War II veterans and survivors, published on CD and distributed throughout the Dutch school system; a partnership with the North Sea Jazz Festival; a two-day conference on "Biotechnology: the Science and the Impact" in January 2000; and a cyber security panel co-hosted with Royal Dutch Shell and the RAND Corporation.

In November 2000, Schneider hosted the US delegation to the COP-6 Climate Change Conference in The Hague, in which the Kyoto Protocol and climate change were discussed.

Schneider was responsible for US cooperation with and assistance to the International Criminal Tribunal for the Former Yugoslavia (ICTY). She was also the top U.S. official in the Netherlands during the Lockerbie trial of the two Libyans accused of bombing Pan Am 103.

Before and during the Kosovo War, Schneider acted as liaison between the American and Dutch militaries.

Schneider gave speeches on a wide range of topics during her ambassadorship, including the global economy, biotechnology, Dutch-American relations, the glass ceiling, politics and culture in America, and the traditions of freedom and democracy in America and in Europe. She was the first American to be invited to give the keynote address on the annual Dutch commemoration of the liberation from the Nazis (May 5, 2000, "Freedom Must be Passed On") and the first non-Dutch speaker to deliver the annual William of Orange lecture (June 5, 2001, "Culture, Society, and Government").

In 2001, Schneider was awarded the Exceptional Public Service Award by the U.S. Department of Defense. Schneider earned award, the highest civilian honor given by the Pentagon, in recognition of her support for the U.S. military during her ambassadorship.

== Return to academia ==
Since 2004, Schneider has been a Distinguished Professor in the Practice of Diplomacy in the School of Foreign Service at Georgetown University. She has taught courses, published research, and given public lectures on the topic of cultural diplomacy. She has also organized conferences, including "Communicating with the World: Diplomacy that Works," held at Georgetown University, April 30, 2003, and "Cultural Diplomacy: Recommendations and Research" at the Center for Arts and Culture in July 2004.

Schneider was named a Pfizer Medical Humanities Fellow from 2004-2006. In this role, she initiated a program to pool and strengthen Georgetown's resources in order to promote the integration of the life sciences into daily life. She was also the principal investigator on a project funded by the Rockefeller Foundation to research and define "best practices" in public-private partnerships for agricultural biotechnology in development.

In 2006, Schneider became a nonresident senior fellow at the Brookings Institution. Here, she served as coordinator of the Arts and Culture Initiative, and furthered her work in cultural diplomacy, helping to launch the Timbuktu Renaissance, a Mali-based platform for countering extremism and promoting peace and development through a focus on culture.

Schneider is the co-founder and co-director of Muslims on Screen and Television (MOST), an initiative aimed at providing Hollywood screenwriters with accurate information on Muslims and the Muslim world.

Since 2011, Schneider has been a member of the Executive Committee of the Board of the Peace Research Endowment.

In 2012, Schneider co-founded the Laboratory for Global Performance and Politics, a joint initiative between Georgetown’s School of Foreign Service and College of Arts and Sciences, with the mission of humanizing global politics through performance. Schneider serves as co-director of The Lab with Derek Goldman, a theater director, playwright, and professor of performing arts at Georgetown University.

Schneider also co-directs the Timbuktu Renaissance, a Malian-American initiative supporting Mali's recovery from conflict through a focus on culture, and the Los Angeles-based Muslims on Screen and Television (MOST) resource. Schneider speaks Dutch, French, Italian, and German.

=== Papers and lectures ===
Schneider has been invited to speak on a wide range of topics, including public and cultural diplomacy, U.S. and Muslim world relations, U.S.-European relations, various aspects of the life sciences, and women in the workplace. A full list of publications is available on her website. Her writings for the Brookings Institution are collected on its website.

== Honors ==
In addition to the Exceptional Public Service Award, Schneider is the recipient of the Flevo Award, in recognition of international leadership, and the U.S. Secret Service Honor Award. She is also an honorary member of Phi Beta Kappa, Harvard University chapter.

Diplomatic posts
Preceded by K. Terry Dornbush	61st United States Ambassador to the Netherlands; 1998–2001	Succeeded by Clifford Sobel
