= Ray Garrett Jr. =

American lawyer (1920–1980)

Chair of the U.S. Securities and Exchange Commission
- In office August 6, 1973 – October 28, 1975
- President: Richard Nixon; Gerald Ford
- Preceded by: G. Bradford Cook
- Succeeded by: Roderick M. Hills

Personal details
- Born: August 11, 1920
- Died: February 3, 1980 (aged 59) Chicago, Illinois, U.S.
- Spouse: Virginia Hale (m. 1943)
- Children: 3
- Education: Yale University (AB); Harvard Law School (LLB)
- Occupation: Lawyer; public official; educator

Ray Garrett Jr. (August 11, 1920 – February 3, 1980) was a member of the Gardner Carton & Douglas law firm in Chicago until his appointment as the chairman of the U.S. Securities and Exchange Commission (SEC) under President Richard Nixon in 1973, where he served for two years.

== Early life ==
Ray Garrett Jr. was born on August 11, 1920, to Ray Garrett, a lawyer. He attended public schools in Glencoe and Evanston, Illinois. He graduated from Evanston Township High School. He graduated from Yale University with an A.B. in 1941, where he was a member of the glee club and Beta Theta Pi fraternity. In 1949, he graduated from Harvard Law School with a LL.B.

Garrett served in the U.S. Army during World War II as a captain in the artillery, where he saw action at the Battle of the Bulge. He was in the first American artillery battalion across the Rhine and earned a bronze star. He served in the Army National Reserve and was associated with the U.S. Army's Office of the Deputy Chief of Staff for Logistics.

== Career ==
Following graduation, Garrett remained at Harvard Law School as a teaching fellow. He was assistant professor of law at New York University School of Law from 1950 to 1952. In 1952, he joined the Chicago law firm Gardner Carton & Douglas.

On October 25, 1954, Garrett joined the U.S. Securities and Exchange Commission (SEC) in Washington, D.C. He was associate director of the division of corporate regulation until January 6, 1956. He then served as director of the division. In 1958, he rejoined Gardner, Carton & Douglas. He was a visiting lecturer at Northwestern University School of Law. He was appointed chairman of the SEC by President Richard Nixon in August 1973 to replace G. Bradford Cook following the Watergate scandal. He served in the role until October 1975. He spearheaded the demise of fixed commissions on stock transactions, which met with mixed results.

Garrett was a member of the board of directors of the Chicago, Milwaukee, St. Paul and Pacific Railroad. He was on the board of the Chicago Title and Trust Company. In 1965, he was chairman of the section of corporation banking and business law of the American Bar Association. He was chairman of the advisory committee for the corporate department financing department of the American Bar Foundation. He participated in revising Parts VII through XI of the American Law Institute's Federal Securities Code which was published the year he died, and was a frequent contributor to journals in his field.

== Personal life ==
Garrett married Virginia Hale, daughter of John T. Hale, of Rockdale, Texas, on July 27, 1943. They had three daughters, Nancy, Susan and Anne. He lived on Myrtle Street in Winnetka, Illinois.

Garrett died on February 3, 1980, at Evanston Hospital in Chicago.

== Legacy ==
The Ray Garrett Jr. Corporate and Securities Institute at Northwestern University was established in memory of Garrett.

Government offices
| Preceded by G. Bradford Cook | Securities and Exchange Commission Chair; 1973 – 1975 | Succeeded by Roderick M. Hills |
