= Roderick M. Hills =

American politician (1931–2014)

Chairman of the Securities and Exchange Commission
- In office October 28, 1975 – April 10, 1977
- President: Gerald Ford
- Preceded by: Irving M. Pollack
- Succeeded by: Harold M. Williams

Personal details
- Born: Roderick Maltman Hills; March 9, 1931 Seattle, Washington, U.S.
- Died: October 29, 2014 (aged 83) Johns Hopkins Hospital, Baltimore, Maryland, U.S.
- Party: Republican
- Spouse: Carla Anderson Hills (m. 1958)
- Children: 4
- Education: Stanford University (BA, LLB)

Roderick Maltman Hills (March 9, 1931 – October 29, 2014) served as chairman of the U.S. Securities and Exchange Commission between 1975 and 1977. Later he worked at the investment bank of Drexel Burnham Lambert and then at the law firm of Donovan, Leisure, Newton & Irvine.

== Biography ==
Hills was born in Seattle, Washington and grew up in Whittier, California, where he played high school football under the same coach as former President Richard M. Nixon. A janitor's son, Hills was the first in his family to go to college.

Hills received his bachelor's degree from Stanford University and then his Bachelor of Laws at Stanford Law School in 1955, following which he served as law clerk to Justice Stanley F. Reed, Supreme Court of the United States, during 1955 to 1957.

In 1962, he founded the law firm of Munger, Tolles & Hills (now Munger, Tolles & Olson) along with six other lawyers. He was also Founder and Chairman Emeritus of the US-ASEAN Business Council. During his career he also served as a founding name partner with his wife at Latham, Watkins & Hills, the DC branch of Latham & Watkins, as the chief executive officer of Peabody Coal and—in the early 1980s—as the Washington-based head of a merchant banking arm of Sears that was known as Sears World Trade. He had been, since 1996, a partner at the law firm of Hills & Stern. From 1984 until his death in 2014, he served as chairman of Hills Enterprises, Ltd. (formerly The Manchester Group, Ltd.).

== Personal life ==
He was married to former United States Secretary of Housing and Urban Development Carla Anderson Hills from 1958 until his death. His son, Roderick M. Hills Jr., is a law professor at the New York University School of Law, and his daughter, Laura Hills, attended Stanford Law School.

Hills died on October 29, 2014, at Johns Hopkins Hospital in Baltimore at age 83 of heart failure.

== See also ==
- List of law clerks for the sixth seat of the Supreme Court of the United States

Government offices
Preceded by Ray Garrett, Jr.	Securities and Exchange Commission Chair; 1975–1977	Succeeded by Harold M. Williams
