= Richard C. Breeden =

American politician (born 1949)

24th Chairman of the Securities and Exchange Commission
- In office October 11, 1989 – May 7, 1993
- President: George H. W. Bush; Bill Clinton
- Preceded by: David Sturtevant Ruder
- Succeeded by: Arthur Levitt

Personal details
- Born: December 6, 1949 (age 76) Levittown, New York, U.S.
- Party: Republican
- Spouse(s): Holly Breeden, Linda H. Breeden
- Education: Stanford University (A.B.); Harvard Law School (J.D.)

Richard C. Breeden (born December 6, 1949) is a former chairman of the U.S. Securities and Exchange Commission, hedge fund manager, and corporate chairman.

== Early career ==
Breeden began his career practicing corporate and securities law in New York City. During the administrations of Presidents Reagan, Bush (I) and Clinton, he held a series of government posts, including assistant to the President for issue analysis under President George H. W. Bush.

== U.S. Securities and Exchange Commission ==
Although he had never worked in the securities industry, Mr. Breeden was appointed to lead the SEC, where he cut a colourful figure, wearing striped suspenders and driving a red Porsche with the license plate 1RCB1. His domineering style earned him the nickname "King Richard." He exhibited a penchant for speaking his mind, as when he told his staff that he wanted insider traders left "naked, homeless and without wheels."

From 1989 to 1993, Breeden served as Chairman of the U.S. Securities and Exchange Commission. During his tenure, Breeden's actions included:

- changing US proxy rules to create "short slate" proxy contests;
- changing the rules to allow institutional investors to discuss performance problems at companies;
- creating the "compensation discussion and analysis" section of the proxy;
- requiring graphical presentations of share performance;
- requiring disclosure of equity grants and valuation for the first time;
- requiring listing of the names of compensation committee members;
- broadening the scope for permissible shareholder resolutions in areas relating to compensation and governance.

== Career ==
For more than a decade prior to launching Breeden Partners, Breeden and his consulting firm Richard C. Breeden & Co. LLC served as advisors to companies engaged in restructurings or turnarounds of distress situations. Many of these companies experienced fraud, compliance problems or serious governance abuses, as well as prolonged performance difficulties. For example, Mr. Breeden led the turnaround of WorldCom, Inc., and he has served as the monitor of the accounting firm KPMG in its successful recovery from criminal activities involving abusive tax shelters. Prior to forming his own firm Mr. Breeden served as chairman of the worldwide financial services practice of Coopers & Lybrand.

Mr. Breeden was also highly involved with S.E.C. investigation of Hollinger International and Conrad Black as counsel of the special committee and chief author of its report. Black was initially convicted in Illinois to serve 78 months in prison and pay $6.1 million to Hollinger and a fine of $125,000. Conrad Black served a total of 37 months after the US Supreme Court unanimously vacated the four counts of the original seventeen that remained and two fraud charges were overturned by the 7th Circuit Court of Appeals, leaving one fraud charge and one obstruction of justice charge. The 6.5 year sentence was reduced to 42 months. The $6.1 million fine to the SEC was reduced to $600,000 in 2010. Mr. Breeden is one of the named parties in a $872 million libel suit in Canada initiated by Conrad Black after the conviction. Black won the libel suit which settled for $5 million, the largest defamation settlement in Canadian history.

On May 15, 2019, Conrad Black was granted a full pardon by President Donald Trump.

Breeden served as non-executive chairman of the board of H&R Block, following a successful proxy contest in 2007 to 2011. He also serves as a director of Zale Corporation and STERIS Corp. and has previously served as a director of BBVA, SA, one of the 20 largest banks in the world. Mr. Breeden has served on approximately 15 corporate or advisory boards during his career. Breeden was not successful kin turning Zale Corporation around. How much responsibility he bears for its deteriorating position was the subject of discussion among current and former executives, former board members, analysts and vendors. Some of these people say Zale has made mistakes trying to please Breeden, who is known for his forceful personality, such as by buying back high-priced shares and by leasing an expensive billboard at Yankee Stadium.

In 2006 Breeden founded Breeden Partners, which he is chairman of, and its manager Breeden Capital Management. Breeden is the founding partner of Breeden Partners Europe, which was launched in December, 2008. Breeden Partners has affiliated entities registered in the Cayman Islands, to take advantage of generous offshore tax benefits.

== Personal ==
Breeden was the oldest of three children and grew up in Manhattan Beach, California. He graduated B.A. from Stanford University in 1972 and received his J.D. from Harvard Law School in 1975. He currently lives in Greenwich, Connecticut with his 2nd wife, Linda H. Breeden. Breeden is the father of five sons.

Government offices
Preceded by David Sturtevant Ruder	Securities and Exchange Commission Chair; 1989 – 1993	Succeeded by Arthur Levitt
