= J. Paul Getty Trust =

American art institution in Los Angeles

The J. Paul Getty Trust
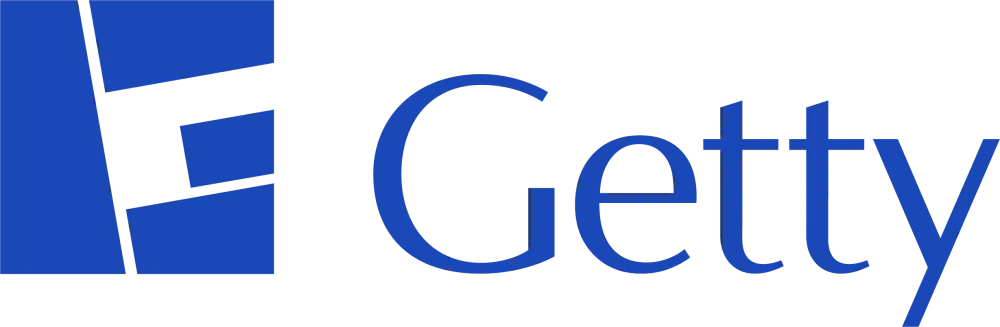
- Founded: 1953; 73 years ago
- Founder: J. Paul Getty
- Purpose: "Aims to further knowledge and nurture critical seeing through the growth and presentation of its collections and by advancing the understanding and preservation of the world's artistic heritage."
- Location: Los Angeles, California, U.S.
- Method: Grants, research
- Key people: Katherine E. Fleming, President and CEO
- Revenue: $925.7 million (2025)
- Expenses: $442.7 million (2025)
- Endowment: $9.4 billion (2025)
- Website: getty.edu

The J. Paul Getty Trust is the world's wealthiest art institution, with an estimated endowment of US$8.4 billion in 2022. Based in Los Angeles, California, it operates the J. Paul Getty Museum, which has two locations—the Getty Center in the Brentwood neighborhood of Los Angeles and the Getty Villa in the Pacific Palisades neighborhood of Los Angeles. Its other programs are the Getty Foundation, the Getty Research Institute, and the Getty Conservation Institute.

With an estimated 1.6 million visitors per year, the trust operates one of the most visited museums in the United States. The trust also provides grants and training to other museums and cultural institutions. The trust has a library, publications program and visiting scholar program. The trust's conservation program is dedicated to advancing conservation practice through the creation and delivery of knowledge. However, since 2008, the trust has scaled back the scope of its activities in response to financial challenges.

== History ==
The J. Paul Getty Museum Trust was established by business tycoon J. Paul Getty in 1953. Getty had founded the Getty Oil Company in 1942, and Fortune magazine named him the richest living American in 1957. At his death, he was worth more than $2 billion. Getty died in 1976 and left the bulk of his estate, including nearly $660 million worth of stock in Getty Oil, to the J. Paul Getty Museum Trust. Legal conflicts over the will took years to resolve, but in 1982, the trust finally received Getty's full bequest. The trust began to add a number of new programs in 1982, and in February 1983, it petitioned the court to change its name to 'The J. Paul Getty Trust'.

In 1997, Barry Munitz was named the president and CEO of the trust. He began work in January 1998, succeeding Harold M. Williams, the first president of the Getty Trust, who oversaw construction of the $1 billion Getty Center designed by architect Richard Meier. With an endowment of $4.2 billion, in 2009 the Getty Trust was the wealthiest art institution in the world. Early in his tenure, Munitz reorganized the Getty Trust, closing two of the institution's six programs—the Getty Information Institute and the Getty Education Institute. To deal with long-run financial issues, he sought to cultivate relationships with donors and corporate partners. His leadership became increasingly controversial as the Getty Trust was embroiled in numerous controversies relating to the provenance of various antiquities in the Getty Museum's collections and Munitz' expense account. In the midst of an investigation by the California Attorney General, Munitz resigned in 2006 and was forced to "forgo his severance package of more than $2 million, and reimburse the Getty Trust for $250,000 after alleged improprieties including lavish expense account spending."

On December 4, 2006, the trust announced the hiring of art historian James N. Wood, the former Director of the Art Institute of Chicago, as the trust's new president and CEO, replacing Barry Munitz, who was forced to step down earlier in the year. In 2009, after a substantial drop in the trust's assets, Wood cut nearly 100 employees at the trust's various operations, most at the Getty Museum. Fees for parking at the museum and the Getty Villa were raised by 50% to $15. Wood died suddenly of natural causes on June 12, 2010. In May 2011 James Cuno, director of the Art Institute of Chicago, was named president and chief executive of the Getty Trust, to take office in August. In April 2022, Katherine Fleming, Provost of New York University, was named president and chief executive of the Trust, to take office in August 2022.

== Programs ==
The J. Paul Getty Museum is an art museum. It has two locations, one at the Getty Center in Los Angeles, California, and one at the Getty Villa in Pacific Palisades, Los Angeles, California. The museum at the Getty Center contains "Western art from the Middle Ages to the present;" its estimated 1.3 million visitors annually makes it one of the most visited museums in the United States. The museum at the Getty Villa contains art from "ancient Greece, Rome, and Etruria". The museum started as J. Paul Getty's personal art collection.

The Getty Foundation was originally called the "Getty Grant Program," which began in 1984 under the direction of Deborah Marrow. The J. Paul Getty Trust can spend up to 0.75% of its endowment on gifts and grants; by 1990 the Getty Grant Program (then based in Santa Monica) had made 530 grants totaling $20 million to "art historians, conservators and art museums in 18 countries". For example, a foundation grant funded the restoration of the Cosmati Pavement in the floor of Westminster Abbey. For many years, the foundation conducted the Getty Leadership Institute (GLI). The major GLI program is the Museum Leadership Institute (MLI), formerly known as the Museum Management Institute, which "has served close to 1,000 museum professionals from the United States and 30 countries worldwide". However, effective on January 2, 2010, the GLI was transferred to the Claremont Graduate University in Claremont, California and was renamed "The Getty Leadership Institute at Claremont Graduate University".

The Getty Research Institute (GRI), located at the Getty Center in Los Angeles, California, is "dedicated to furthering knowledge and advancing understanding of the visual arts". GRI maintains a research library, organizes exhibitions and other events, sponsors a residential scholars program, publishes books, and maintains electronic databases including a Semantic Web service. The GRI was originally called the "Getty Center for the History of Art and the Humanities", and was conceived as early as 1983. Among other holdings, GRI's research library contains about 900,000 volumes of books, periodicals, and auction catalogs; special collections; and two million photographs of art and architecture. The library also includes the trust's "Institutional Archives" which document the activities of the trust's various programs.

The Getty Conservation Institute (GCI), located in Los Angeles, California, is headquartered at the Getty Center but also has facilities at the Getty Villa, and commenced operation in 1985. The GCI is a private international research institution dedicated to advancing conservation practice through the creation and delivery of knowledge. It "serves the conservation community through scientific research, education and training, model field projects, and the dissemination of the results of both its own work and the work of others in the field" and "adheres to the principles that guide the work of the Getty Trust: service, philanthropy, teaching, and access". GCI has activities in both art conservation and architectural conservation. GCI scientists study the deterioration of objects and buildings, and how to prevent or stop such deterioration. GCI has also been involved with long-term education programs, such as establishing a master's degree program in Archaeological and Ethnographic Conservation in collaboration with the University of California, Los Angeles.

From 1983 to June 1999, the Trust ran the Getty Information Institute (GII) which sought to collect electronic information to serve cultural heritage institution and researchers. Together with the American Council of Learned Societies GII sought to build a broad coalition of non-profits to establish a National Initiative for a Networked Cultural Heritage. Upon the dissolution of the GII, its data bases were transferred to the Getty Research Institute.

== Governance ==
The trust was established by a Trust Indenture dated December 2, 1953 that created a California charitable trust was "the diffusion of artistic and general knowledge." The trust is governed by a 13-member board of trustees. Trustees are elected to serve four-year terms, with a maximum limit of three terms. The board is self-perpetuating with the board electing or re-electing the trustees. The board holds an annual meeting in May or June of each year. Although the board conducts most of its work through committees, a number of important decisions are reserved for the entire board including approval of any art acquisition costing more than $1 million.

On October 2, 2006, the California Attorney General issued a report following an investigation of the trust and its operations. At the close of the investigation an independent monitor was hired to assure proper governance and expenditures of the trust. On May 7, 2008, the Attorney General closed the monitoring process.

The trust was hurt by the economic downturn following 2007 and reduced its annual budget by 14%. In 2007, the trust had $6.4 billion in endowment, but this amount dropped to $4.5 billion in 2009. In 2009, the trust had $300 million in expenses down from $349 million in 2008. For example, GRI co-produced the Avery Index to Architectural Periodicals with the Avery Architectural and Fine Arts Library, but transferred that activity to Columbia University on July 1, 2009.

With the recovery of the post-recession economy, the trust rose to $6.9 billion by 2018.

== J. Paul Getty Medal ==
The J. Paul Getty Medal was established in 2013 by the Trustees of the J. Paul Getty Trust to honor extraordinary contributions to the practice, understanding and support of the arts.

The first recipients of the Getty Medal, which was presented in December 2013, were Harold M. Williams and Nancy Englander, who were honored for their leadership in creating the Getty as it exists today. In November 2014, the Getty Medal was presented to Jacob Rothschild, 4th Baron Rothschild, a volunteer cultural leader known for his dedication to the preservation and public interpretation of Waddesdon Manor.

In September 2015, the Getty Medal was awarded to architect Frank Gehry, who has built an architectural career over five decades and produced public and private buildings in America, Europe, and Asia. His work has earned Mr. Gehry several of the most significant awards in the architectural field, including the Pritzker Architecture Prize.

The 2016 Getty Medal was awarded to musician Yo-Yo Ma and, posthumously, to artist Ellsworth Kelly at a celebratory dinner in October. In addition to his accomplished career as a master cellist, Ma founded the Silk Road Ensemble and the nonprofit Silkroad to promote the creation of new music, cross-cultural partnerships, education programs, and cross-disciplinary collaborations to create meaningful change at the intersection of the arts, education, and business. Accomplished painter and sculptor Ellsworth Kelly has supported the conservation of historical and contemporary art at museums and heritage sites in the U.S. and around the world, as well as the preservation of natural environment, through the Ellsworth Kelly Foundation.

Artist Anselm Kiefer and writer Mario Vargas Llosa were presented with the 2017 J. Paul Getty Medal at a dinner in New York City on November 13, 2017.

In September 2018, the Getty Medal was awarded to Thelma Golden, director and chief curator of The Studio Museum in Harlem, Agnes Gund, president emerita of the Museum of Modern Art, and Richard Serra, minimalist sculptor.

The 2019 J. Paul Getty Medal was awarded to classicist Mary Beard and artists Ed Ruscha and Lorna Simpson. The 2020 recipients, announced in February, were Alice Walton, Martin Puryear, and Kwame Anthony Appiah.
