= Deborah Marrow =

American art historian

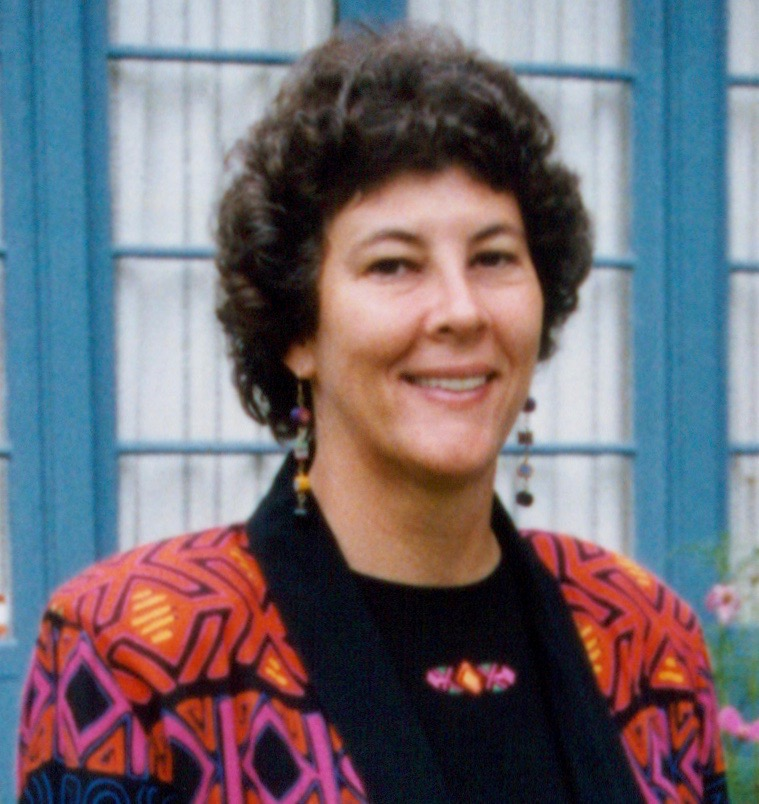
- Born: October 18, 1948; New York, New York
- Died: October 1, 2019; Santa Monica, California
- Education: BA in History, University of Pennsylvania, 1970; MA in Art History, Johns Hopkins University, 1972; PhD in Art History, University of Pennsylvania, 1978.
- Occupations: Foundation director, art historian
- Known for: Promotion of philanthropy in the field of art history

Deborah Marrow (October 18, 1948 – October 1, 2019) was an American foundation director and art historian who worked for 36 years with the J. Paul Getty Trust in Los Angeles, California. She worked at the Trust from 1983 to 2019, including two assignments as interim president and chief executive officer and 30 years as Director of the Getty Foundation.

== Early life and education ==
Deborah Marrow was born in New York City on October 18, 1948, to Adele (Wolin) Marrow and Seymour A. Marrow. Raised in Scarsdale, New York, Marrow attended Quaker Ridge Elementary School and Scarsdale High School, where she was an exceptional student involved in various extracurricular activities. She was a devoted camper at Camp Walden in Denmark, Maine, where her daughter, Anna, and her sister, Jane Marrow Bemis, also attended.

In 1966, she started attending the University of Pennsylvania in Philadelphia, where she graduated cum laude with a degree in history in 1970. She went on to obtain a master's degree in art history at Johns Hopkins University in Baltimore, Maryland in 1972, before returning to Penn to complete her PhD in art history in 1978. Her major and minor fields were baroque art and modern art, respectively.

== Personal life ==
Marrow met her husband, Michael J. McGuire, at the University of Pennsylvania on the third night of her freshman year (1966). They were married for 48 years and had two children, Anna Marrow McGuire and David Marrow McGuire. She married Michael on June 19, 1971, in a simple ceremony at her parents' house in Scarsdale. Marrow and Michael spent a year in London, Paris and Florence in 1976-77 while she did her thesis research. She moved to California with Michael in 1977.

== Early career ==
Before, during, and after obtaining her PhD, Marrow worked as a teacher. In the 1970s, she taught art history at local colleges in the Philadelphia area. In California, she finished her doctoral thesis on the art patronage of Maria de' Medici in 1978, after which she taught at various colleges and universities in the Los Angeles area. She was an adjunct assistant professor at Occidental College in 1979, 1981 and 1982, and she was a field faculty advisor at Goddard College from 1975 to 1979. In the late 1970s, she was managing editor and member of the editorial board of the feminist publication Chrysalis.

== J. Paul Getty Trust ==
In 1982, she was hired as a consultant by the then-nascent J. Paul Getty Trust to help vet senior staff being considered for the growing organization. In 1983, she started work with the Getty as publication coordinator in the new publications program. She was appointed director of the Getty Grant Program (now the Getty Foundation) in 1989 where she spent the rest of her career.

During her tenure at the Getty Trust, she became the acting director of the Getty Research Institute (1999–2000), and in 2000, she assumed the additional role of dean for external relations for the Getty. She was asked to step in as interim president and chief executive officer during two periods. During her first assignment as interim CEO in 2006–07, she led the Getty to overcome difficult governance challenges. As many people have stated, during this period she restored the “trust” in the Getty Trust. Her second stint as interim CEO (2010–11) came about due to the untimely death of James Woods. Marrow was regarded by art history professionals as a leader and consummate art historian who led many international efforts to improve the field.

A notable achievement by Marrow was developing the concept for Pacific Standard Time: Art in L.A., 1945–1980 which was celebrated throughout Southern California in 2011-2012. Under her leadership, the foundation awarded $28 million in grants to dozens of cultural institutions across Southern California to tell the story of the Los Angeles art scene. Pacific Standard Time highlighted contemporary art in post-World War II Los Angeles and involved dozens of museum exhibitions, a performance art festival, public programming and more than 100 gallery shows. Pacific Standard Time: LA/LA (2017–18) extended that collaborative model to fund exhibitions and scholarly research focused on Latin American and U.S. Latino art in Southern California. In addition to generating attention to a little-studied field, PST: LA/LA involved nearly 2.8 million participants.

In her work at the Getty, she traveled throughout six of the seven continents.

Upon the announcement of her retirement in 2018, the Getty Board of Directors renamed an internship program that she founded in her honor: the Getty Marrow Undergraduate Internship Program. Over 27 years, the Internship Program has funded more than 3,000 students working at local arts institutions including museums throughout the southern California area.

== University of Pennsylvania ==
She was a dedicated alumna of the University of Pennsylvania (Penn). In 2001, she served on the committee celebrating 125 years of women at Penn. Marrow joined the Board of Trustees in 2003. Her tenure on the Board included membership on the Executive; Nominating; Local, National, and Global Engagement; Facilities and Campus Planning; and Honorary Degrees and Awards Committees. She also served on the Academic Policy Committee, which she chaired for six years. In 2004, Marrow was part of the consultative committee that recommended to the Trustees Amy Gutmann for election as Penn's eighth president. She was an Overseer at the Weitzman School of Design and she served as a member of the Penn Alumni Board of Directors, the Trustees' Council of Penn Women and the Southern California Regional Advisory Board. In 2013, she was named a Charter Trustee in honor of her contributions. She served as an Emerita Trustee until her death.

== Professional associations ==
Marrow served many organizations in the fields of art history, museums, preservation, and philanthropy. She served on the board of Town Hall Los Angeles. She was a board member of the Courtauld Institute of Art, the University of California Humanities Research Institute, and Southern California Grantmakers. She was a member of the National and International Committees for the History of Art, the Save America’s Treasures Committee of the National Trust for Historic Preservation in partnership with the White House Millennium Council, the International Committee of the Council on Foundations, the Association of Research Institutes in the History of Art, and the American Association of Museums task force that produced the report Excellence and Equity.

== Awards and honors ==
In 2019, Marrow received the Award for Distinguished Service to Museums from the American Alliance of Museums. She was honored by the American Institute for Conservation in 2019 with the President's Award in recognition of her substantial support of research and education in conservation. Marrow received the President's Non-Profit Leadership Award from East Los Angeles College in 2017, which was widely acknowledged by certificates of appreciation from political and cultural leaders throughout the Los Angeles area. In 2012, she received the Centennial Award from the College Art Association for leadership and service to the field. Marrow received the degree of Doctor of Humane Letters, Honoris Causa from Goucher College in 1983 where she gave the commencement address.

== Symposia and exhibitions ==
- Philadelphia Museum of Art, "Recent Acquisitions: Massimo Stanzione, the Massacre of the Innocents," October 10 - December 29, 1974
- Philadelphia Focuses on Women in the Visual Arts (FOCUS), member of Steering Committee, in charge of documentation, 1973-1974

== Lectures and panel discussions ==
- College Art Association Annual Meetings, 1987-2018 "Information Session: The Getty Grant Program"
- Southern California Association for Philanthropy, Management Series, 1989 "Grantmaking in Specialized Areas"
- University of California, Los Angeles, 1988 "Gender and Art"
- International Committee for the History of Art (C.I.H.A.), Washington, D.C. 1986, Berlin 1992 "Information Session: The Getty Grant Program"
- Renaissance Society of America, National Conference, 1985 "The Renaissance Patron in Italy," session commentator
- Texas Christian University, Fort Worth, Texas, 1984 "Rubens' ‘’Life of Maria de' Medici’’: Painting, Politics, and Patronage in the Seventeenth Century"
- University of Southern California, 1983 "Rubens' Iconography"
- Huntington Library, Women's History Conference, 1982 "A Re-evaluation of the Patronage of Maria de' Medici"
- College Art Association Annual Meeting, 1980 "Women in Power: Maria de' Medici and Female Heroic Imagery"
- New York University, International Conference on The Second Sex, 1979 "Chrysalis Magazine: Media-ating the Movement in the Active Voice," panelist
- Occidental College, California State University at Long Beach, Marymount College, 1980-1984, various additional lectures on topics in seventeenth-century art and women's studies
- College Art Association Annual Meeting, 1978 "New Matronage: Women's Support for Women's Art," Panel moderator and speaker
- University of Pennsylvania, 1974 "Feminist Perspectives on Art History: Some Women Art Historians Speak About Their Work"

== See also ==
- J. Paul Getty Trust
- Getty Foundation
- Pacific Standard Time: Art in L.A., 1945–1980
- Pacific Standard Time: LA/LA
- Save America's Treasures

== Publications ==
- Marrow, Deborah. 1982. The Art Patronage of Maria de’ Medici. Ann Arbor, Mich.:UMI Research Press.
- Marrow, Deborah. 1979. “Maria de' Medici and the Decoration of the Luxembourg Palace.” The Burlington Magazine. December.
- Marrow, Deborah, and Peggy Kimball. 1979. “Two Years of Chrysalis.” Chrysalis. No. 9. September.
- Marrow, Deborah, and Arlene Raven. 1979. “Eleanor Antin: What's Your Story?” Chrysalis. No. 8, June.
- Marrow, Deborah. 1978. “A Massacre of the Innocents and the Neapolitan Baroque.” Philadelphia Museum of Art Bulletin. March.
- Marrow, Deborah. 1974. “Massimo Stanzione's Massacre of the Innocents, A Recent Acquisition at the Philadelphia Museum of Art.” exhibition pamphlet.
