= John S. R. Shad =

American politician

United States Ambassador to the Netherlands
- In office June 24, 1987 – February 23, 1989
- President: Ronald Reagan; George H. W. Bush
- Preceded by: Paul Bremer
- Succeeded by: C. Howard Wilkins Jr.

22nd Chair of the Securities and Exchange Commission
- In office May 6, 1981 – June 18, 1987
- President: Ronald Reagan
- Preceded by: Harold M. Williams
- Succeeded by: David Sturtevant Ruder

Personal details
- Born: John Sigsbee Rees Shad; June 27, 1923
- Died: July 7, 1994 (aged 71)
- Party: Republican
- Spouse: Patricia Shad
- Children: 2
- Education: University of Southern California; Harvard University; New York University School of Law

John Sigsbee Rees Shad (June 27, 1923 – July 7, 1994), served as chairman of U.S. Securities and Exchange Commission between 1981 and 1987. He also served as the ambassador to the Netherlands. He earned degrees from the University of Southern California, the Harvard Business School and the New York University Law School.

He said when he was the head of the SEC that he had wanted to spend a third of his life learning, a third earning, and a third serving.

He had two children, Leslie Shad and Rees Shad, and was married to Patricia Shad.

== Legacy ==
- Shad Hall, at Harvard Business School, was named for him; in 1987, Shad had provided a $20 million endowment to the school for a "Business Leadership and Ethics" program.
- John S.R. Shad papers at Baker Library Special Collections, Harvard Business School.

Government offices
Preceded by Harold M. Williams	Securities and Exchange Commission Chair; 1981 – 1987	Succeeded by David Sturtevant Ruder
Diplomatic posts
Preceded by L. Paul Bremer	58th U.S. Ambassador to the Netherlands; 1987–1989	Succeeded by C. Howard Wilkins, Jr.
