= G. Bradford Cook =

American lawyer (1937–2014)

George Bradford Cook
- Born: May 10, 1937; Lincoln, Nebraska, U.S.
- Died: August 28, 2014 (aged 77); Longville, Minnesota
- Occupations: Lawyer; Former chairman, U.S. Securities and Exchange Commission
- Spouse: Laura Shedd Armour Cook
- Children: Jennifer Colman Cook

George Bradford Cook (May 10, 1937 – August 28, 2014), also known as G. Bradford Cook and Brad Cook, was an American lawyer who served as chairman of the U.S. Securities and Exchange Commission in 1972. He resigned after being caught up in the Robert Vesco securities fraud scandal and received temporary disbarments in two states for lying to a grand jury in the case.

== Education ==
Cook was born on May 10, 1937, in Lincoln, Nebraska, to George Brash Cook, an insurance executive, and Margaret Colman Cook. He attended public elementary and junior high school in Lincoln, and then Phillips Exeter Academy in Exeter, New Hampshire, where he graduated from high school in 1955.

Cook applied to Stanford Law School and was accepted. However, wanting a career in politics, he thought it would be easier to build that career in Nebraska than California. So he applied to and was accepted at the University of Nebraska College of Law. He graduated in 1961, and in the fall of 1962 joined the law firm of Winston Strawn Smith & Patterson in Chicago, Illinois, where he practiced securities law.

He wed Laura Shedd Armour, a descendant of meatpacking robber baron Philip Danforth Armour, on January 22, 1966. The couple had a daughter, Jennifer, in 1975.

== Career ==
Cook was very active in Republican Party politics (as was his father). A friend asked him to apply for the general counsel position at the Federal Communications Commission, but he declined.

He was invited to interview for the general counsel position at the United States Department of Health, Education and Welfare, but again declined because he felt the agency was too big and it was outside his specialty. His political activities led William J. Casey, chairman of the Securities and Exchange Commission (SEC), to interview him for the general counsel job there in summer 1971. Cook was appointed to the position on September 1, and sworn in on September 7. In 1972, Chairman Casey reorganized the SEC to create Market Regulation, a regulatory division. Cook was appointed associate director of the new division, and retained his job as general counsel. Cook's opportunity to vault to the chairmanship of the SEC came just a year later.

Richard Helms resigned as Director of the Central Intelligence Agency in early 1973. Casey, once an intelligence officer himself, resigned from the SEC to seek the CIA position. Through friends, Cook made it known that he wanted to be chairman of the SEC. He won the backing of both White House Chief of Staff H. R. Haldeman and Assistant to the President for Domestic Affairs John Ehrlichman. Cook was nominated by President Richard Nixon, approved by the United States Senate, and sworn in as SEC chairman on March 3, 1973. He was the youngest person ever to lead a federal agency.

== Vesco scandal ==
=== Development of the case against Vesco ===
In 1972, SEC Chairman William Casey met with Cook and assigned him an enforcement case then pending against Robert Vesco. In doing so, Casey took the case away from the SEC's Enforcement Division, a move Cook claims he did not question. A mutual fund company, Investors Overseas Service (IOS), which was registered in Panama, was attempting to come into the United States, a complicated process that involved changing the company's articles of incorporation, bylaws, operating procedures, finances, and governance to conform with American securities law. Vesco was battling Bernard Cornfeld, chief executive officer of IOS, for control of the company, and the SEC was investigating Vesco for having covered up the transfer of $224 million in corporate funds to a personal account.

Vesco made a $200,000 cash donation to the 1972 Nixon presidential campaign with the expectation that he would receive favorable treatment from the SEC. Another $50,000 in cash was given in violation of federal elections laws. Harry L. Sears, a prominent Republican fund-raiser in New Jersey and Vesco associate, delivered the cash donations to Maurice Stans, Nixon's former Secretary of Commerce and head of finance for Nixon's presidential re-election campaign. Stans arranged for Sears to meet with United States Attorney General John N. Mitchell, and Mitchell set up a meeting with Sears, Casey, and Cook in May 1972.

=== Improper discussions with Maurice Stans ===
Cook became aware of the Vesco cash donations and the intent with which they were made. Cook alleges that he told Casey about the donations, although he cannot confirm that Casey did anything with the information. Casey later denied knowing how the embezzled $250,000 had been used.

Shortly after his conversation with Casey, Cook went on a hunting trip in Texas with Stans. On November 13, 1972, while he and Stans crouched in a rice field, Cook mentioned that he wished to be SEC chairman and that he was prosecuting a number of cases, including the Vesco lawsuit. Cook mentioned that the SEC had testimony that Vesco had given Stans $250,000 in cash donations. Two days later, back in Washington, Stans called Cook and asked that the information about the $250,000 be deleted from the legal filings in the case. Cook agreed to do so, and told SEC Associate Director of Enforcement Stanley Sporkin to remove the information. On November 17, Cook called Stans to confirm that the change had occurred. Cook said in 1973 in congressional testimony that the deleted information was made with Chairman Casey's concurrence. Casey agreed that he told Cook to "work it out" with Sporkin, but denied knowing that Cook had spoken with Stans.

On March 7, 1973, Stans invited Cook to the White House for lunch. Stans informed Cook that the Nixon campaign was going to return the money to Vesco, and asked that discussion of the donation be edited out of testimony the SEC would file with the court. After speaking with Sporkin, Cook advised Stans that the testimony had to be submitted in full and he could not do as Stans had asked.

=== Testimony and resignation ===
Federal prosecutors began investigating possible illegal fund-raising by the Nixon re-election campaign in 1973 as part of the Watergate scandal. Cook was called before a grand jury to testify about the Vesco donations on April 19, 1973, and again on May 3 and May 7, 1973. He also testified before a Senate committee on May 1 and May 14, and before a House committee on May 22. During this testimony, Cook swore under oath that he had never discussed the Vesco case with Stans until after the case was filed on November 27, 1972.

On Thursday, May 10, a grand jury indicted Vesco, Sears, Mitchell, and Stans with conspiracy to defraud the United States and conspiracy to obstruct justice, and Mitchell and Stans with perjury. The following day, Cook said he had done nothing wrong and would not resign.

But on Wednesday, May 16, Cook resigned effective immediately as chairman of the Securities and Exchange Commission. He had served as chairman for just 74 days. The Washington Star reported that Cook believed he was going to be impeached, and offered to resign. The White House allowed him to do so.

=== Fallout from perjury admissions ===
The trial of Mitchell and Stans on the grand jury charges began on February 19, 1974.

In his initial testimony, Cook testified that Stans said he (Stans) had lied to the grand jury investigating the Vesco donation. Cook admitted that he lied to the grand jury on April 19 and to the Senate committee on May 1. Cook also said that Stans called him on the morning of May 7, 1973, to discuss Cook's upcoming grand jury testimony. Cook informed Stans that he was changing his testimony to the grand jury and would tell the truth. When called before the Senate again on May 14, Cook said he changed his testimony again and told the truth.

On cross-examination, Cook admitted to lying a total of five times under oath to the grand jury and Congress, concealing his discussions with Stans. He also revealed that he, not Stans, brought up the Vesco case and called its inclusion in the civil case "overkill", "sensationalism", and "not professional". Cook also admitted on the stand that by discussing the Vesco case, he had violated the law. Stans and Mitchell were acquitted on April 28, 1974.

The fallout from Cook's witness stand admissions was significant. The Senate Appropriations Committee asked the United States Department of Justice on May 1 to file charges of contempt of Congress against Cook for lying. On September 27, 1974, the Nebraska State Bar Association filed a six-count disciplinary complaint with the State Supreme Court against Cook. Although Cook's attorney argued that he should be censured, the State Supreme Court disbarred Cook for three years from the practice of law in Nebraska.

The United States Supreme Court permanently barred Cook from practicing law before it on May 31, 1977, and the Illinois Bar Association followed suit with a three-year disbarment on June 1.

== Post-SEC career ==
After leaving the SEC, Cook became chairman of the board and chief executive officer of Farragut Investments.

As of 2002, Cook was living in Bethesda, Maryland. He was chairman and general counsel of LearnWright, a company that develops and distributes training software for the pharmaceutical industry. He was also general counsel of Empower IT, a company that provided data management services in the packaged-goods industry.

== Death ==
Cook passed away in Longville, Minnesota, on August 28, 2014, at the age of 77.

Government offices
Preceded by William J. Casey	Securities and Exchange Commission Chair; 1973	Succeeded by Ray Garrett Jr.
