= Clifford M. Sobel =

American diplomat (born 1949)

Clifford Michael Sobel
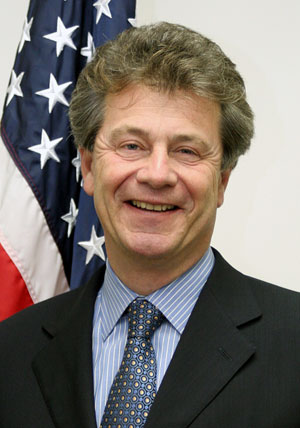

United States Ambassador to Brazil
- In office November 7, 2006 – August 7, 2009
- President: George W. Bush; Barack Obama
- Preceded by: John J. Danilovich
- Succeeded by: Tom Shannon

United States Ambassador to the Netherlands
- In office December 5, 2001 – August 24, 2005
- President: George W. Bush
- Preceded by: Cynthia P. Schneider
- Succeeded by: Roland Arnall

Personal details
- Born: 1949 (age 76–77) Brooklyn, New York
- Party: Republican
- Education: New York University, bachelor's degree
- Occupation: Business executive managing partner, Valor Capital chairman and chief executive officer, SJJ Investment Corp. Top Republican fundraiser

Clifford Michael Sobel (born 1949) is an American business executive, financier, Republican fundraiser, U.S. diplomat and former ambassador. He served as United States Ambassador to the Netherlands from 2001 to 2005 and United States Ambassador to Brazil from 2006 to 2009.

Since 1994, Sobel has been chairman and chief executive officer of SJJ Investment Corp. He is managing partner and founder of the investment firm Valor Capital Group in New York and Brazil. Sobel is the independent director of Diamond Offshore Drilling, Inc.

== Career ==
Sobel is currently partner and founder of the investment firm Valor Capital Group in New York and Brazil, a growth equity and venture capital investment firm focused on United States and Brazil cross border opportunities.

Clifford M. Sobel served as United States Ambassador to the Federative Republic of Brazil from 2006 to 2009. Sobel also served as ambassador to the Netherlands from 2001 to 2005.

Sobel is the independent director of Diamond Offshore Drilling, Inc.

== Honors and awards ==
In 1999, Sobel was awarded an honorary degree from Kean University in New Jersey.

Diplomatic posts
Preceded by Cynthia P. Schneider	62nd U.S. Ambassador to the Netherlands; 2001–2005	Succeeded by Roland E. Arnall
Preceded by John J. Danilovich	U.S. Ambassador to Brazil; 2006–2009	Succeeded by Thomas A. Shannon Jr.
