= Getty Center =

Art museum in Los Angeles, California

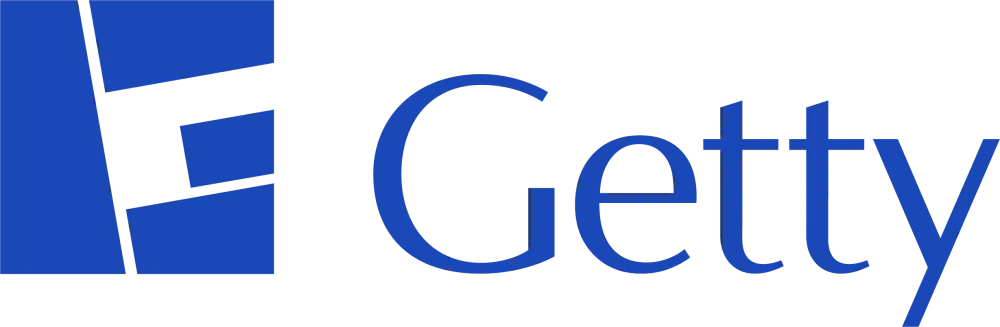

- The Getty Center pavilion in 2022

- Location within the Los Angeles metropolitan area Location within California Location within the United States
- Established: December 16, 1997
- Location: 1200 Getty Center Drive; Los Angeles, California
- Coordinates: 34°04′39″N 118°28′30″W
- Type: Art museum
- Visitors: >1,400,000 (2019)
- President: Katherine Elizabeth Fleming
- Architect: Richard Meier
- Public transit access: Los Angeles Metro Bus: 233, Rapid 761 via Getty Center Tram
- Website: getty.edu/center

The Getty Center is a campus of the Getty Museum and other programs of the Getty Trust in Los Angeles, California. The $1.3 billion center opened to the public on December 16, 1997, and is well known for its architecture, gardens, and views overlooking Los Angeles. The center sits atop a hill in the Santa Monica Mountains, and is connected to a visitors' parking garage at the bottom of the hill by the Getty Center Tram, a three-car, cable-pulled hovertrain people mover.

Located in the Brentwood neighborhood of Los Angeles, the center is one of two locations of the J. Paul Getty Museum and draws 1.8 million visitors annually; the other location is the Getty Villa in the Pacific Palisades neighborhood of Los Angeles. The center branch of the museum features pre-20th-century European paintings, drawings, illuminated manuscripts, sculptures, decorative arts, and photographs from the 1830s through present day. In addition, the museum's collection at the center includes outdoor sculptures displayed on terraces and in the large Central Garden, designed by Robert Irwin. Among the artworks on display is the Vincent van Gogh painting Irises.

Designed by architect Richard Meier, the campus also houses the Getty Research Institute (GRI), the Getty Conservation Institute, the Getty Foundation, and the J. Paul Getty Trust. The center's design included special provisions to address concerns regarding earthquakes and fires.

== Location and history ==
Originally, the Getty Museum started in J. Paul Getty's house in the Pacific Palisades in 1954, which was expanded to include a museum wing. In the 1970s, Getty built a replica of an Italian villa on his home's land to better house his collection, which opened in 1974. After Getty's death in 1976, the entire property was turned over to the Getty Trust for museum purposes. However, the collection outgrew the site, which has since been renamed the Getty Villa, and management sought a location more accessible to Los Angeles. The purchase of the land upon which the center is located, a campus of 24 acres (9.7 ha) on a 110-acre (45 ha) site in the Santa Monica Mountains above Interstate 405, surrounded by 600 acres (240 ha) kept in a natural state, was announced in 1983. The top of the hill is 900 feet (270 m) above sea level, high enough that on a clear day it is possible to see not only the Los Angeles skyline but also the San Bernardino Mountains, and San Gabriel Mountains to the east as well as the Pacific Ocean to the west.

The price tag of the center totaled $733 million which includes $449 million for construction, $115 million for the land and site work, $30 million for fixtures and equipment, and $139 million for insurance, engineers' and architects' fees, permits and safety measures, according to Stephen D. Rountree, former director of the Getty's building program and director of operations and planning for the trust.

Current appraisal for the property fluctuates with the market, but in June 2013 the land and buildings were estimated at $3.853 billion (art not included).

In 1984, Richard Meier was chosen to be the architect of the center. After an extensive conditional-use permit process, construction by the Hathaway Dinwiddie Construction Company began in August 1989. The construction was significantly delayed, with the planned completion date moved from 1988 to 1995 (as of 1990). By 1995, however, the campus was described as only "more than halfway complete".

The center ultimately opened to the public on December 16, 1997. Although the total project cost was estimated to be $350 million as of 1990, it was later estimated to be $1.3 billion. After the center opened, the villa closed for extensive renovations and reopened on January 28, 2006, to focus on the arts and cultures of ancient Greece, Rome, and Etruria. Currently, the museum displays collections at both the Getty Center and the Getty Villa in Pacific Palisades.

In 2005, after a series of articles in the Los Angeles Times about the spending practices of the Getty Trust and its then-president Barry Munitz, the California Attorney General conducted an investigation of the Getty Trust and found that no laws had been broken. The trust agreed to appoint an outside monitor to review future expenditures. The Getty Trust experienced financial difficulties in 2008 and 2009 and cut 205 of 1,487 budgeted staff positions to reduce expenses. Although the Getty Trust endowment reached $6.4 billion in 2007, it dropped to $4.5 billion in 2009. The endowment rebounded to $6.2 billion by 2013.

On April 9, 2026, the Getty Foundation announced that the Getty Center would close on March 15, 2027 for renovations lasting about 11 months; it expects to reopen in spring 2028.

== Architecture ==
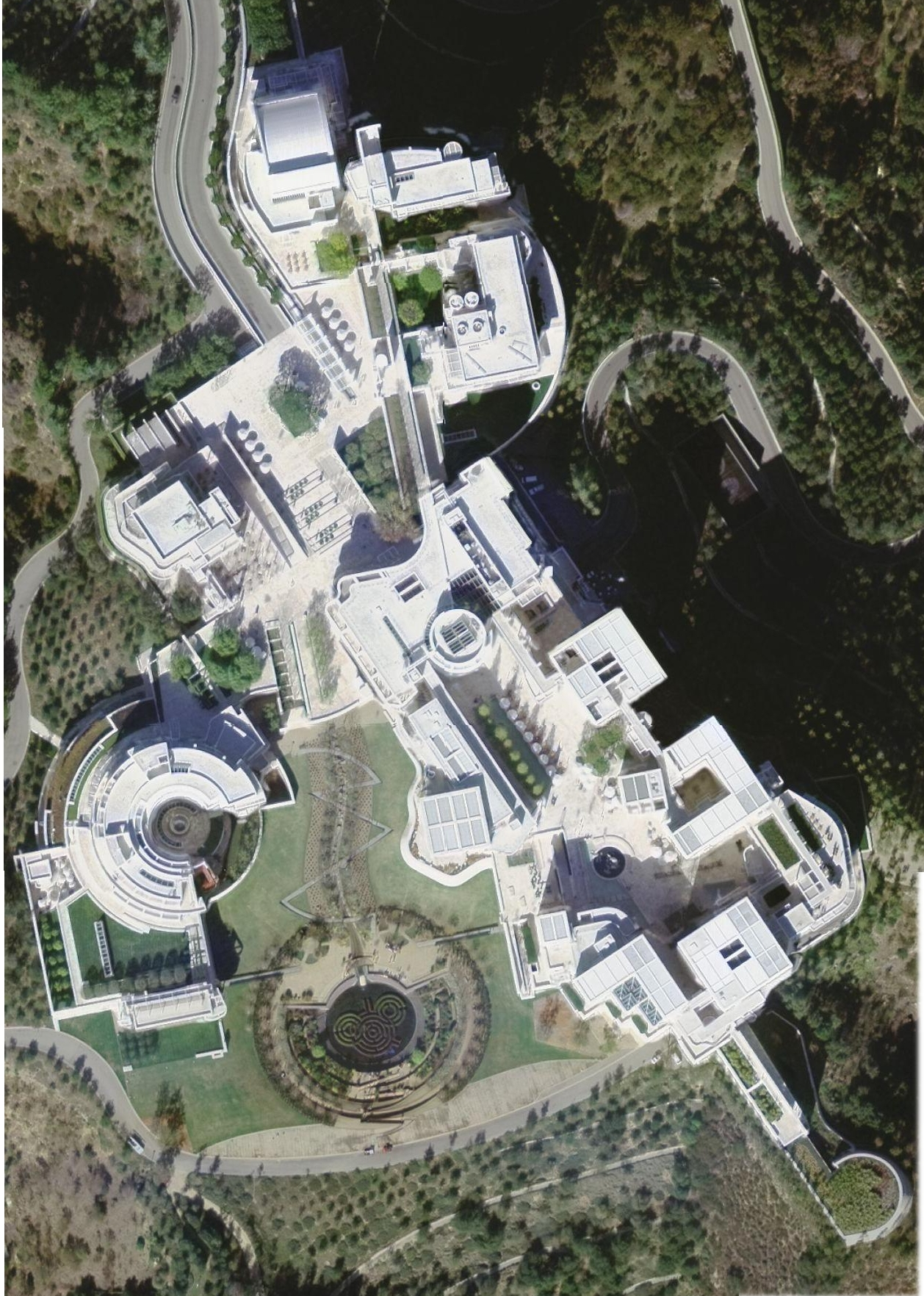
USGS satellite image of the Getty Center, with north at the top.

Cactus Garden perched on the south of the Getty Center, with West Los Angeles in the background

Designed by American architect Richard Meier, the Getty Center was designed with a central view corridor, created with a north-south axis diverging from the north at a 22.5 degree angle along natural ridges. Along the western pavilion is the Restaurant at The Getty Center and the circular Getty Research Institute (GRI) building. The eastern pavilion is further split by an east-west axis, producing a northern grid which contains the J. Paul Getty Trust and the Getty Conservation Institute, and a southern grid which contains the center's exhibitions pavilion.

The eastern north-south axis starts at the helipad, then follows a narrow walkway between the auditorium and northern buildings, continues past the elevator kiosk to the Getty Center Tram station, through the rotunda, past the walls and support columns of the exhibitions pavilion, and finally through the ramp besides the west pavilion and the Robert Irwin Central Garden. Its corresponding east–west visual axis starts with the edge of the scholar's wing of the GRI, the walkway between the central garden and the GRI, the overlook to the azalea pool in the central garden, the walkway between the central garden and the west pavilion, and finally the north wall of the west pavilion and the courtyard between the south and east pavilions.

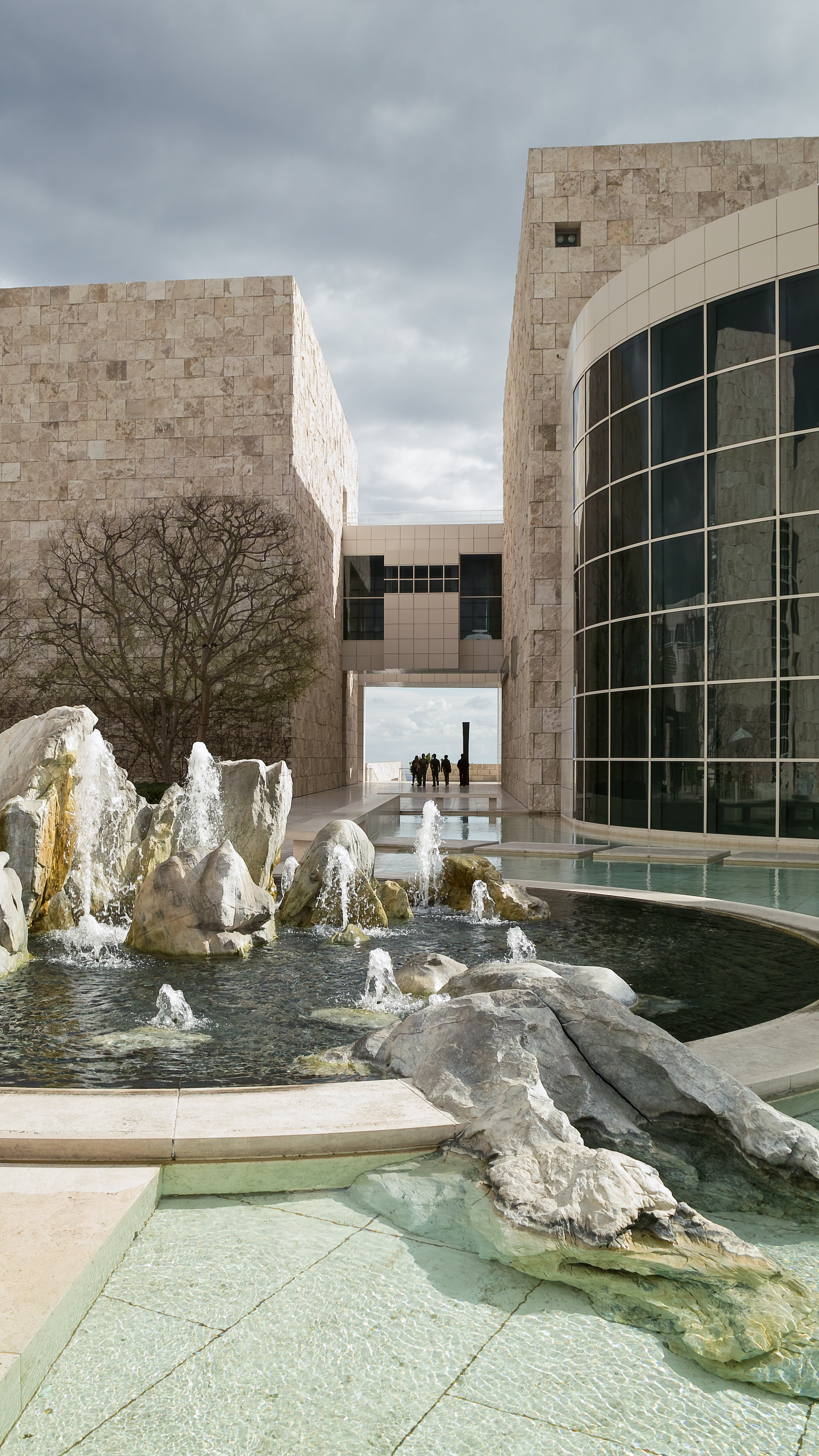
The fountain in the court of the Getty Center

The western north-south axes of the museum grid, offset from the previous axis by 22.5 degrees begins with the arrival plaza, carries through the edge of the stairs up to the main entrance, aligns with the columns supporting the rotunda as well as the center point of the rotunda, aligns with travertine benches in the courtyard between the pavilions, includes a narrow walkway between the west and south pavilions, a staircase down to the cactus garden and ends in the garden.

The corresponding cross axis that further splits the eastern pavilion begins at the center point of the circle which forms the GRI library garden. It then passes to the center of the entrance plaza, and aligns with the south wall of the rotunda building. Although all of the museum is aligned on these alternative axes, portions of the exhibitions pavilion and the east pavilion are aligned on the true north–south axis as a reminder that both grids are present in the campus.

The primary grid structure is a 30-inch (760 mm) square; most wall and floor elements are 30-inch (760 mm) squares or some derivative thereof. The buildings at the Getty Center are made from concrete and steel with either travertine or aluminium cladding. Around 1,200,000 square feet (110,000 m^{2}) of travertine was used to construct the center.

Throughout the campus, numerous fountains provide white noise as a background. The initial design has remained intact; however benches and fences have been installed around the plaza fountains to discourage visitors from wading into the pools. Some additional revisions have been made in deference to the Americans with Disabilities Act.

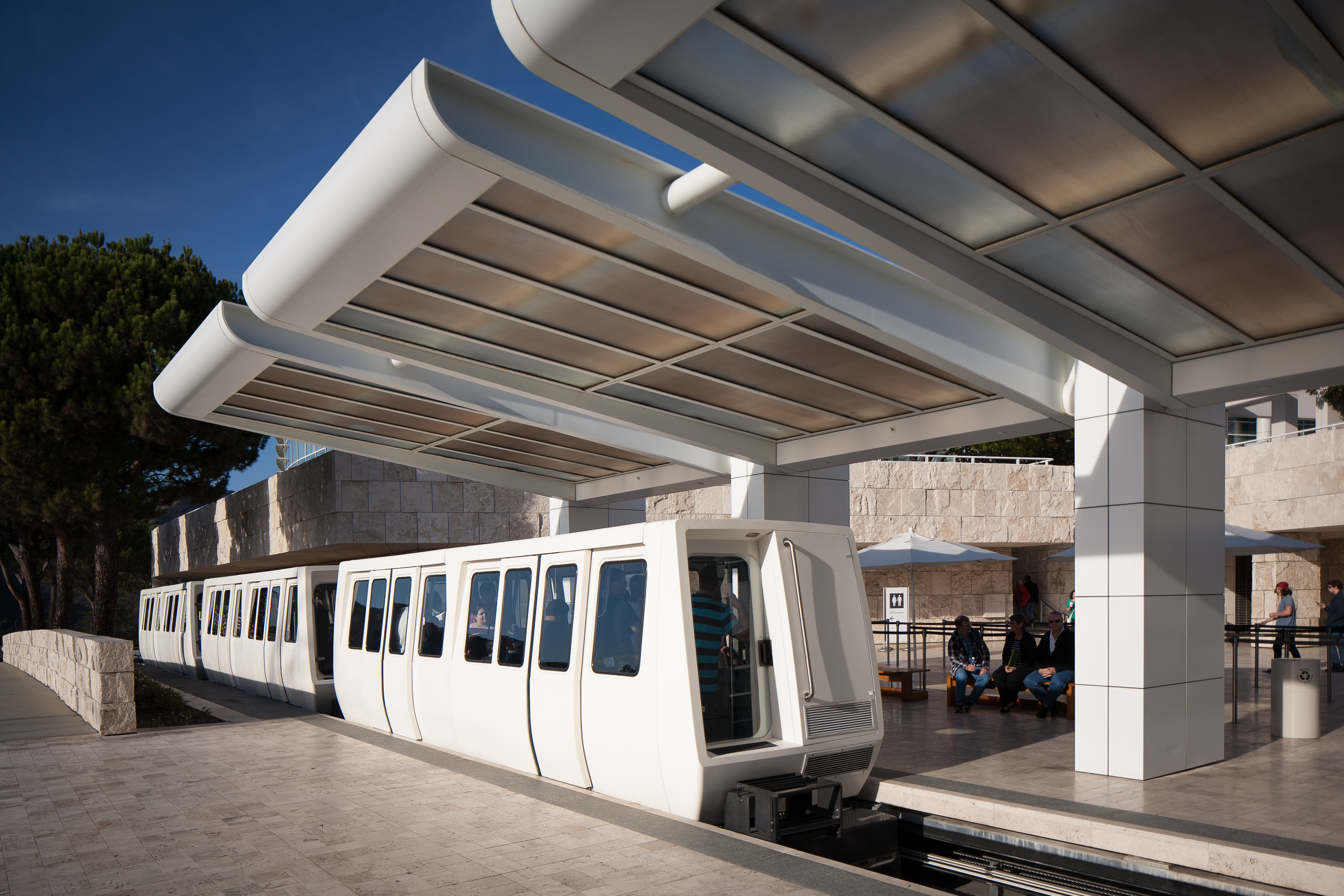
Getty Center Tram at the arrival plaza station

The north promontory is anchored by a circular grass area, which serves as a heliport in case of emergencies, and the south promontory is anchored by a succulent plant and cactus garden. The complex is also encircled by access roads that lead to loading docks and staff parking garages on both the west and east sides of the buildings. The hillside around the complex has been planted with California Live Oak (Quercus agrifolia) trees.

The museum has a seven-story deep underground parking garage with over 1,200 parking spaces. There is a cost for parking in the garage depending on the day of the week and time visited.

An automated three-car, cable-pulled hovertrain people mover called the "Getty Center Tram" takes passengers between the parking garage at the northern bottom of the hill and the museum at the southern top of the hill. The tram runs continuously throughout the day.

Its roof has an outdoor sculpture garden.

== Arrival court and central rotunda ==
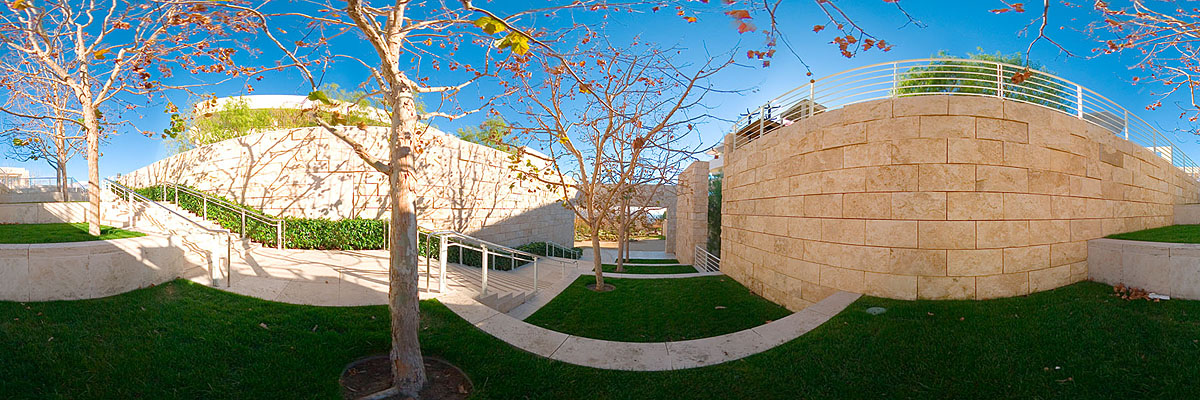
A stairway leading down to the Central Garden

Visitors typically arrive at a tram station in the arrival plaza located between the administrative buildings and the museum entrance. A large set of steps leads to the main doors of the rotunda building. The rotunda building houses information desks, two orientation theatres and museum shops. It also holds a grand staircase that starts a path toward the paintings located on the second floor of each art pavilion. The rotunda opens to the south to a terrace that links all five of the museum pavilions. A separate building to the west of the arrival plaza and stairs holds a cafeteria and restaurant. Next to the restaurant is a stone arch, which separates the museum from the GRI. Stairs from the terrace connecting the GRI and the restaurant lead down to the central garden.

== Museum ==
The J. Paul Getty Museum's estimated 1.8 million visitors annually make it one of the most visited museums in the United States. The collection of the J. Paul Getty Museum on display at the Getty Center includes "pre-20th-century European paintings, drawings, illuminated manuscripts, sculpture, and decorative arts; and 19th- and 20th-century American and European photographs". The paintings include:

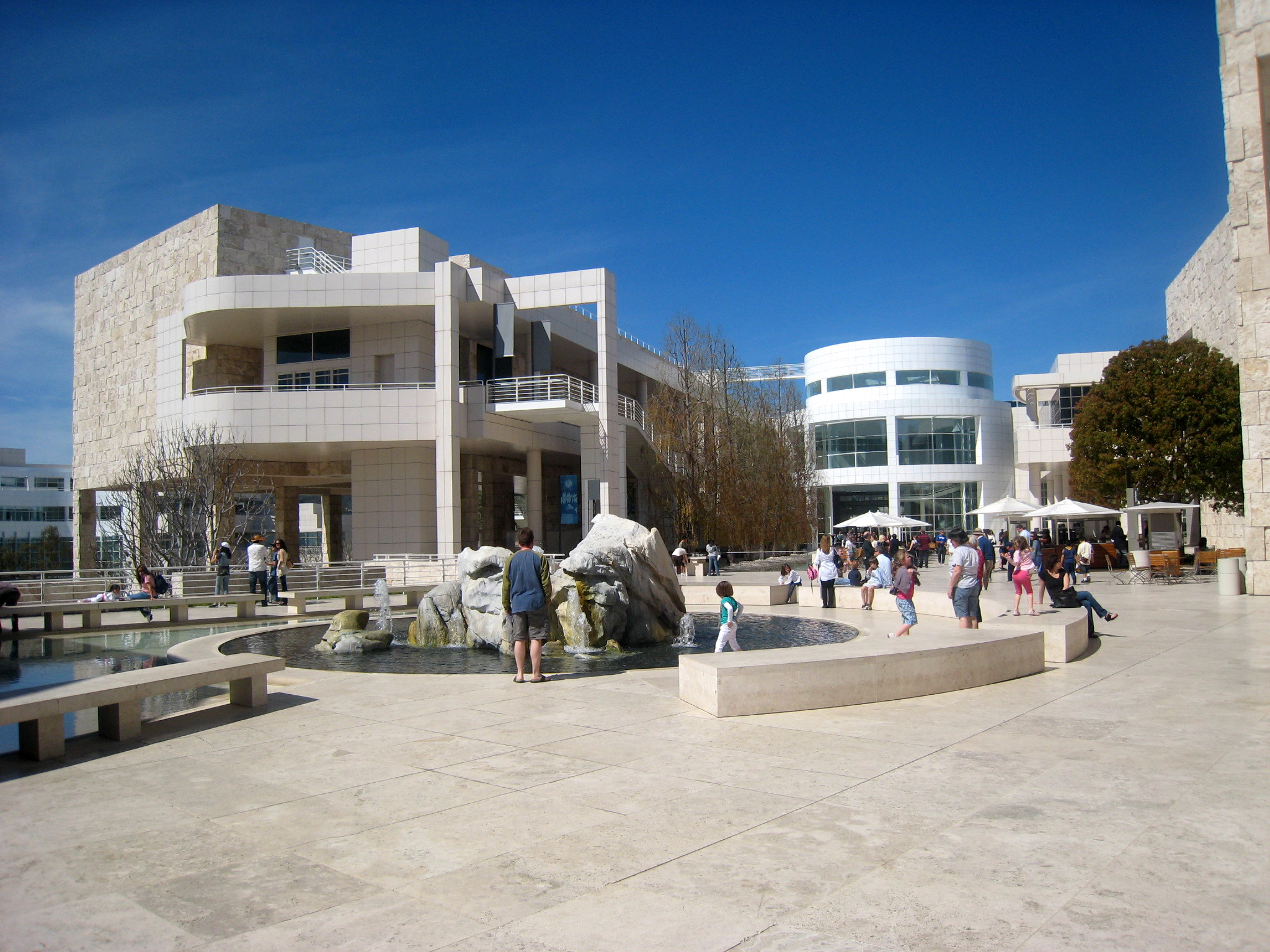
Terrace between pavilions looking toward Exhibitions Pavilion and Rotunda.

- Arii Matamoe (The Royal End) by Paul Gauguin (1892). The museum's director, Michael Brand, stated that the purchase of the painting was "one of the key moments in the history of our collection". The literal translation of the Tahitian words of the title are "noble" and "sleeping eyes", which implies "death".
- Irises by Vincent van Gogh (1889). The museum purchased the painting in 1990; it had sold for $53.9 million in 1987.
- Portrait of a Halberdier by Pontormo (1528–1530). When the museum bought the painting for $35.2 million at an auction in 1989, "the price more than tripled the previous record at auction for an Old Master painting".
- A copy of Portrait of Louis XIV, which measures 114 x 62-5/8 inches, by the workshop of Hyacinthe Rigaud (after 1701).

Getty's extensive photograph collection is located on the lower level of the west pavilion.

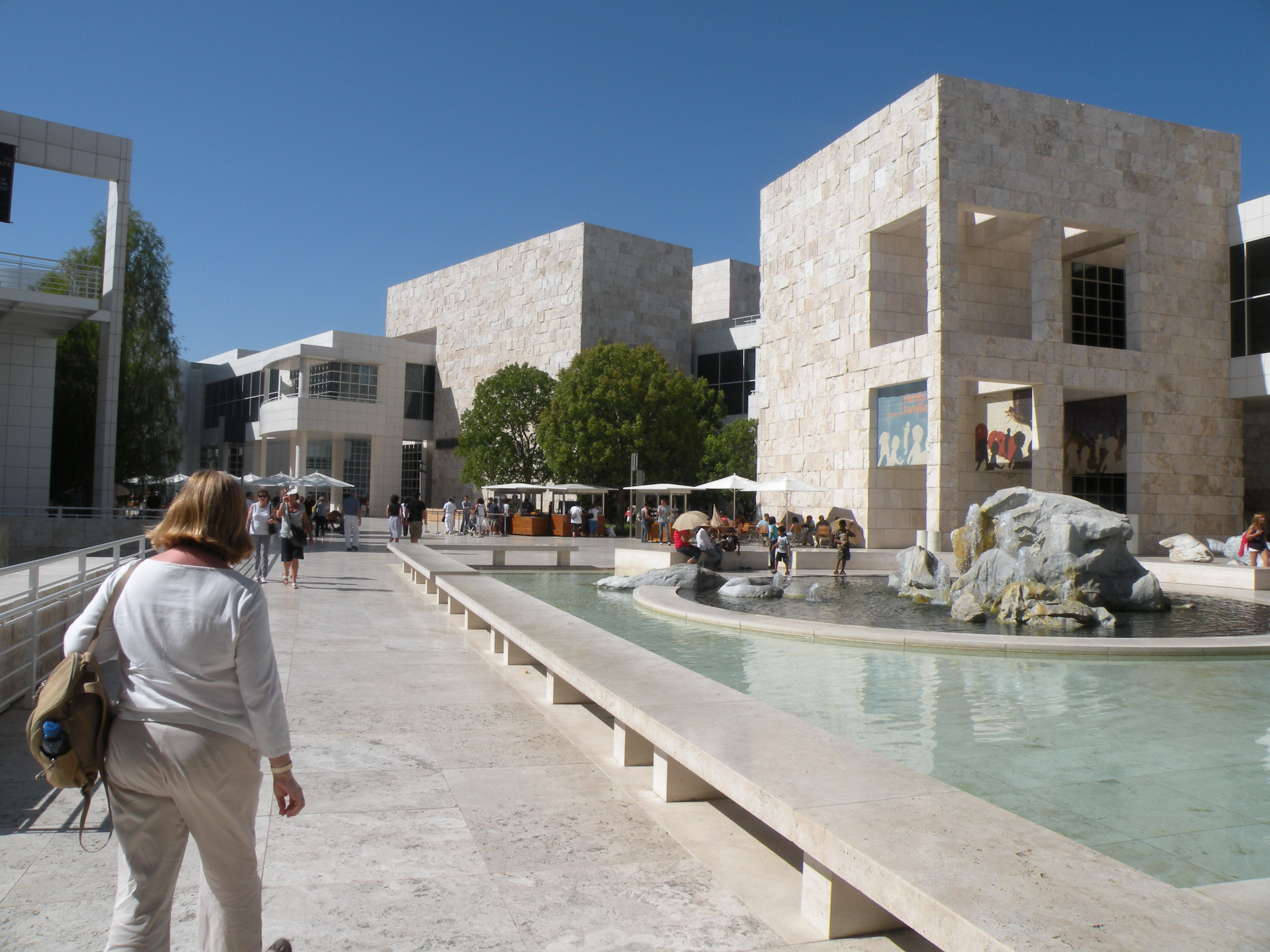
The inner courtyard of the museum

The museum building consists of a three-level base building that is closed to the public and provides staff workspace and storage areas. Five public, two-story towers on the base are called the North, East, South, West and the Exhibitions Pavilions. The Exhibitions Pavilion acts as the temporary residence for traveling art collections and the Foundation's artwork for which the permanent pavilions have no room. The permanent collection is displayed throughout the other four pavilions chronologically: the north houses the oldest art while the west houses the newest. The first-floor galleries in each pavilion house light-sensitive art, such as illuminated manuscripts, furniture, or photography. Computer-controlled skylights on the second-floor galleries allow paintings to be displayed in natural light. The second floors are connected by a series of glass-enclosed bridges and open terraces, both of which offer views of the surrounding hillsides and central plaza. Sculpture is also on display at various points outside the buildings, including on various terraces and balconies. The lower level (the highest of the floors in the base) includes a public cafeteria, the terrace cafe, and the photography galleries.

Programs at the museum consist of exhibitions, family workshops, school visits, performances, talks, and tours.

== Central Garden ==
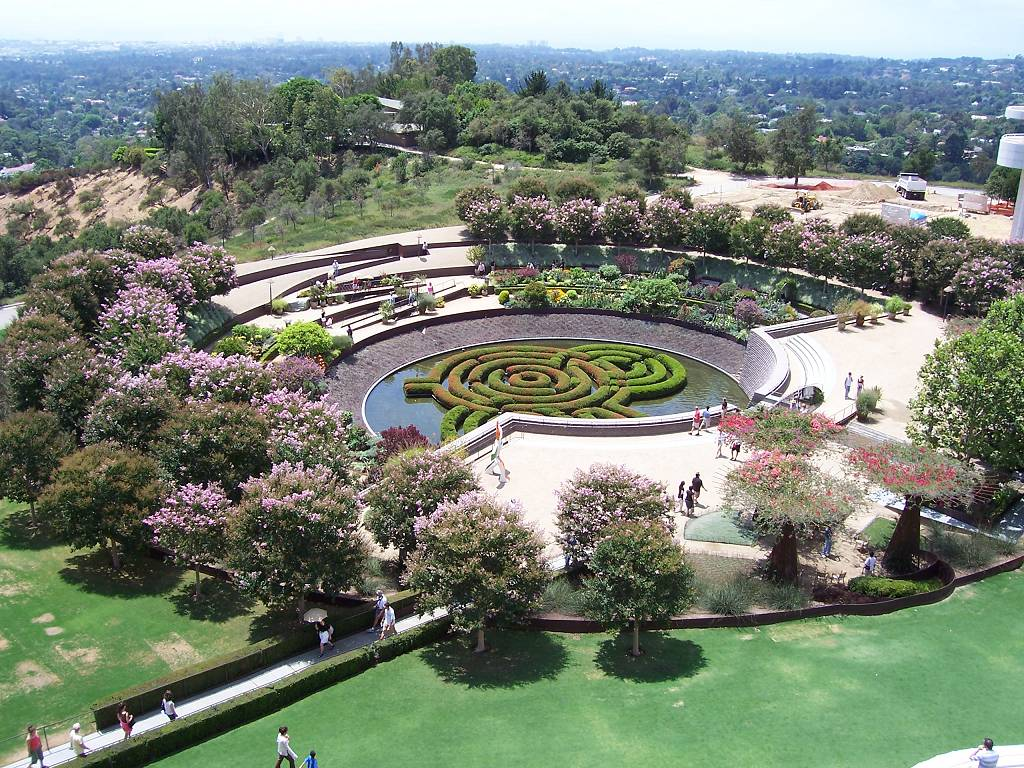
The Central Garden as seen from the museum

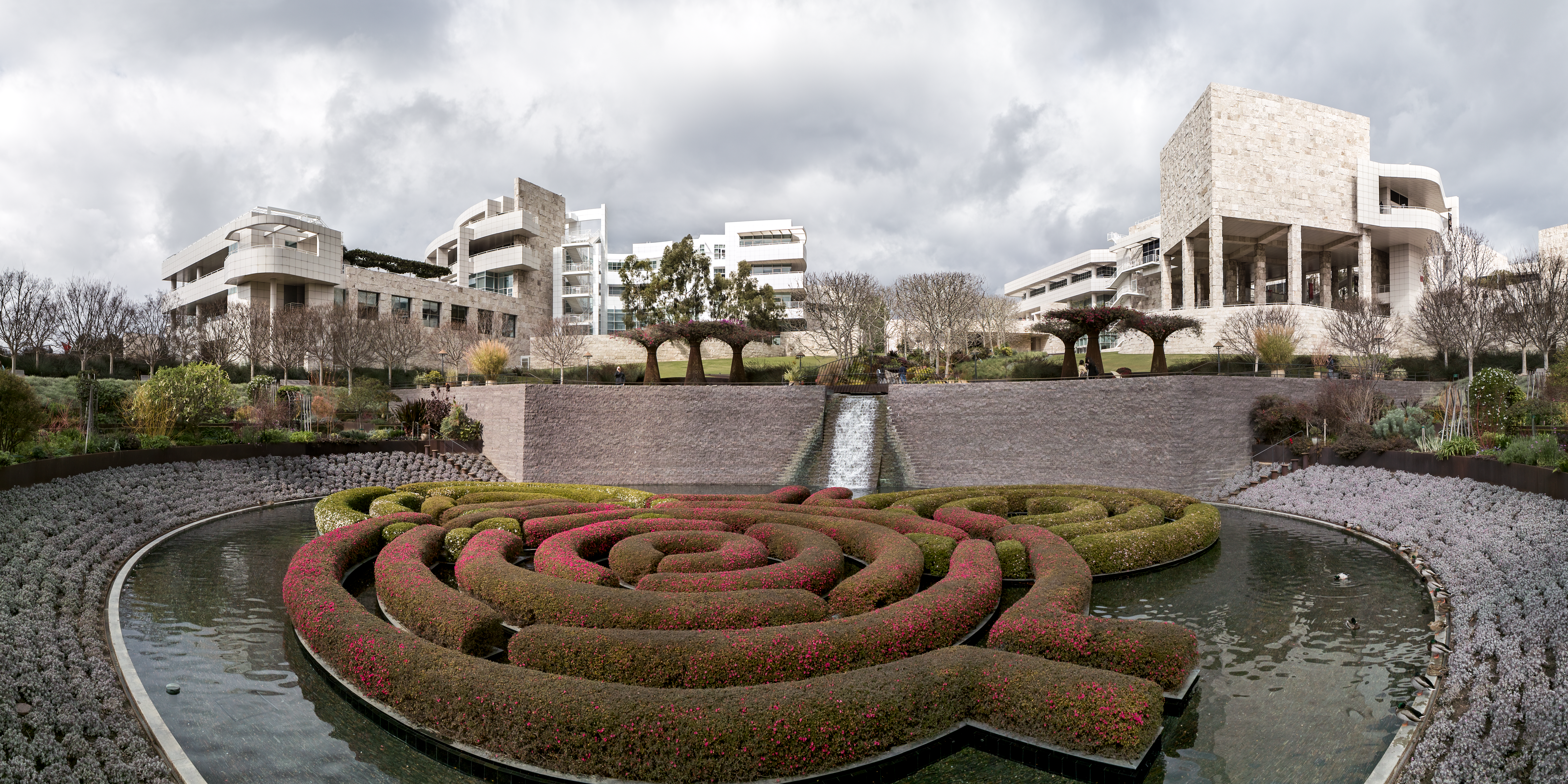
The Getty Center as seen from the garden.

The 134,000-square-foot (12,400 m^{2}) Central Garden at the Getty Center is the work of artist Robert Irwin. Planning for the garden began in 1992, construction started in 1996, and the garden was completed in December 1997.

Irwin was quoted as saying that the Central Garden "is a sculpture in the form of a garden, which aims to be art". Water plays a major role in the garden. A fountain near the restaurant flows toward the garden and appears to fall into a grotto on the north garden wall. The resulting stream then flows down the hillside into the azalea pool. The designers placed rocks and boulders of varying size in the stream bed to vary the sounds from the flowing water. A tree-lined stream descends to a plaza, while the walkway criss-crosses the stream, which continues through the plaza, and goes over a stone waterfall into a round pool. A maze of azaleas floats in the pool, around which is a series of specialty gardens. More than 500 varieties of plant material are used for the Central Garden, but the selection is "always changing, never twice the same".

After the original design, an outdoor sculpture garden, called the "Lower Terrace Garden" was added in 2007 on the west side of the central garden just below the scholar's wing of the GRI building.

== Getty Research Institute (GRI) ==
The Getty Research Institute (GRI) is "dedicated to furthering knowledge and advancing understanding of the visual arts". Among other holdings, GRI's research library contains over 900,000 volumes of books, periodicals, and auction catalogs; special collections; and two million photographs of art and architecture. GRI's other activities include exhibitions, publications, and a residential scholars program. At the Getty Center, GRI is located to the west of the museum. The round building encircles a landscaped garden and is located to the west of the central garden. The main entrance of GRI is connected by a terrace to the main arrival court of the museum, with outdoor sculptures placed along the route. GRI has one art gallery on its entrance level that is open to the public.

== Other offices ==
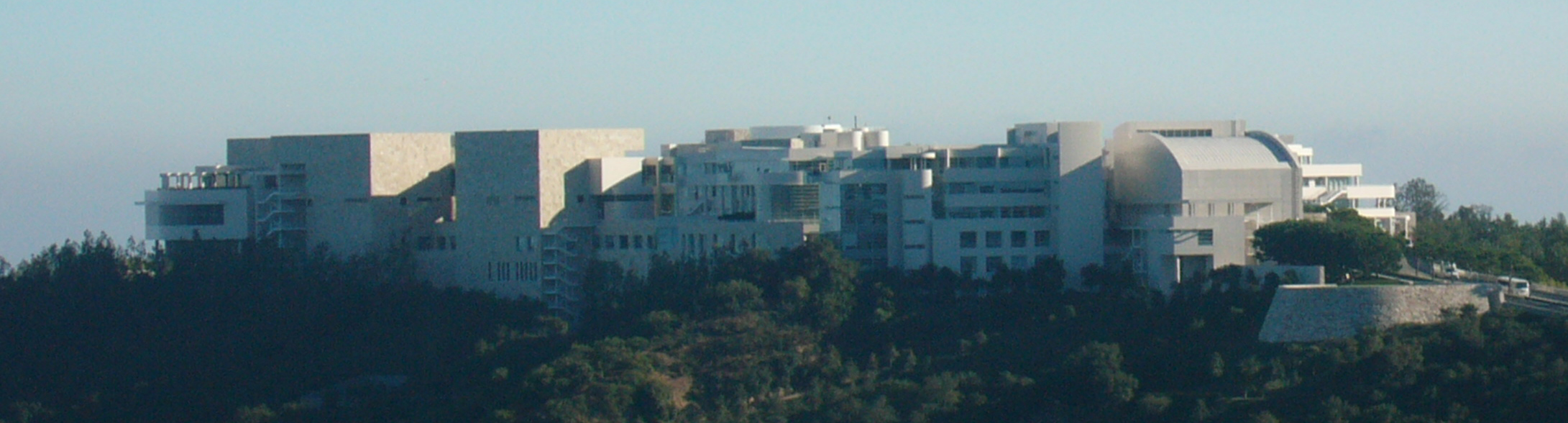
The Getty Center, seen from a hill in Bel-Air. East Building, North Building and Auditorium are closest to camera.

Meier also designed three other buildings located next to the north promontory and offset at a 22.5 degree angle from the main axis of the museum pavilions. The north-most building is an auditorium. Next to it is the North Building, with the East Building sitting between the North Building and the rotunda. The main entrance to the East Building is flanked by two round silos that hold its elevators. A bridge over a sunken courtyard links the main entrance of the East Building to the main walkway that connects the auditorium and North Buildings to the rotunda. These buildings house the Getty Conservation Institute (GCI), the J. Paul Getty Trust and the Getty Foundation. These buildings are generally closed to the public except for special events held in the auditorium. They are linked to the museum both by landscaped terraces and by an enclosed glass walkway that leads from the main rotunda.

GCI, which is headquartered at the Getty Center but also has facilities at the Getty Villa, commenced operation in 1985. It "serves the conservation community through scientific research, education and training, model field projects, and the dissemination of the results of both its own work and the work of others in the field" and "adheres to the principles that guide the work of the Getty Trust: service, philanthropy, teaching, and access". GCI has activities in both art conservation and architectural conservation.

The Getty Foundation awards grants for "the understanding and preservation of the visual arts". In addition, it runs the Getty Leadership Institute for "current and future museum leaders". Its offices are north of the museum. The foundation offices are located in the two administrative buildings that are north of the museum. The J. Paul Getty Trust, which oversees the Getty Conservation Institute, Getty Foundation, Getty Research Institute, and J. Paul Getty Museum, also has offices there.

== Preparation for natural disasters ==
=== Earthquakes ===
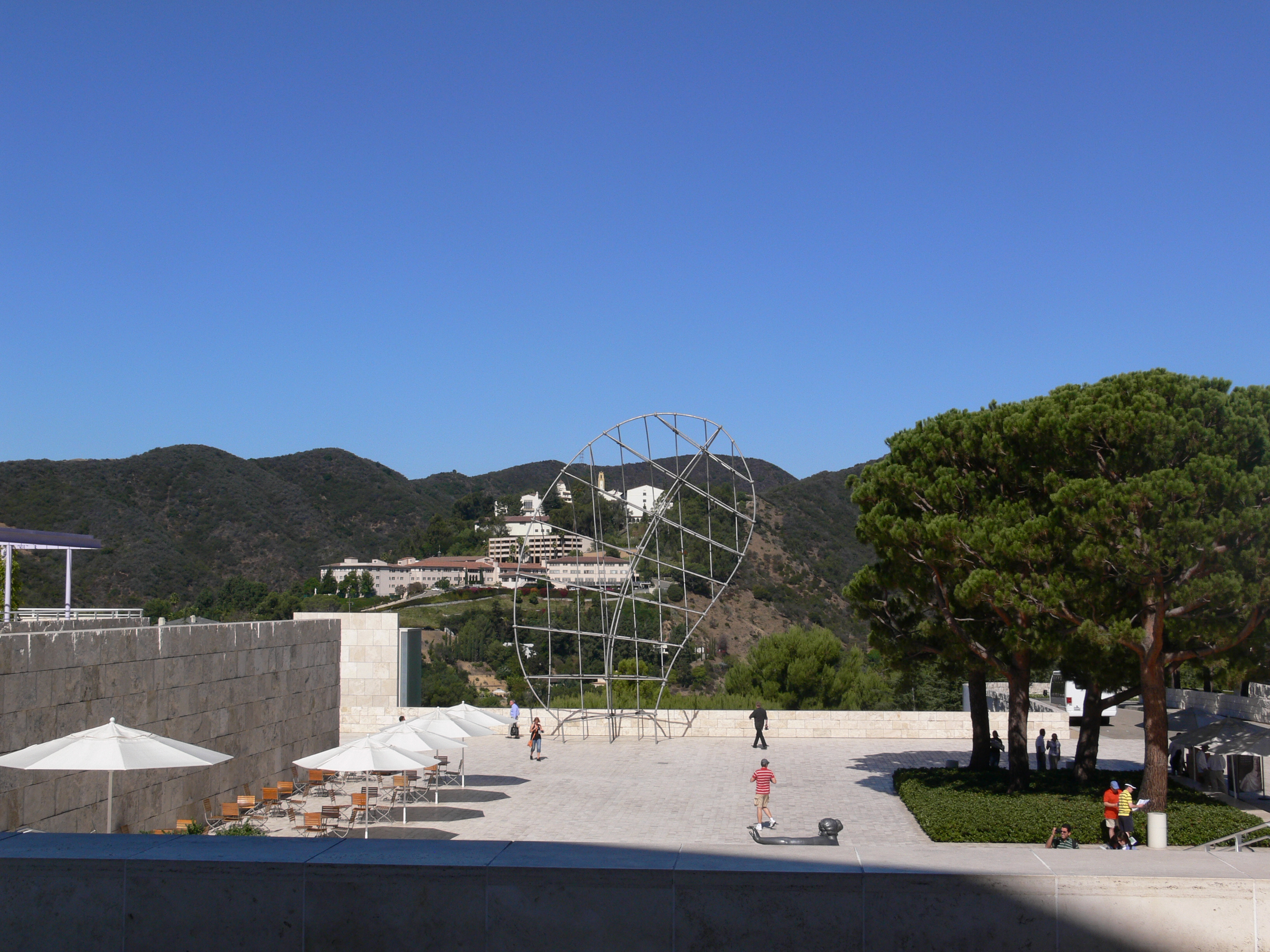
Looking north from main entrance toward arrival plaza.

Although the center's site was thought to have little motion during earthquakes, which are frequent in the Los Angeles area, in 1994, as the center was being constructed, the Northridge earthquake struck. It caused "disturbing hairline cracks... in the welds and plated joints of the steel framework". As a result, the steelwork through the site was retrofitted. The center's buildings are thought to be able to survive an earthquake of 7.5 magnitude on the Richter scale.

=== Fires ===
The Getty Center's architect, Richard Meier, has incorporated a robust anti-fire engineering, leading the Getty to later describe itself as "the safest place for art during a fire". The buildings are made of travertine, chosen specifically for its fire-resistant qualities, concrete and protected steel. These are surrounded by travertine plazas with well-irrigated landscaping that is designed to slow down the spread of fire. Oak trees are regularly pruned so that their canopies remain high off the ground. The native flammable chaparral was removed and fire-resistant poverty weed was added to the slopes around the center. Each year, a herd of goats is rented to clear brush on the surrounding hills. Additionally, the roofs of the Getty buildings are covered with fire-resistant crushed stone. At the north end of the center, a tank with 1,000,000 US gal (3,800,000 L) of water, together with a grass-covered helipad, allow helicopters to collect water. The access ramp from the entry plaza to the museum was constructed to allow a fire truck to pass over it.

Interiors have walls made of reinforced concrete or fire-protected steel, outfitted with automatic fire doors to seal off areas of the building. The air system is designed to maintain a pressure flow that keeps smoke from entering the building during a fire outside. In the 16 electrical transformers at the center, silicone fluid is used as a coolant "with less risk of ignition" than hydrocarbon coolant. The sprinkler system, described as a "last resort", is designed to balance "between the potential damage of a fire and the risk of water damage to valuable artwork".

In 2017, the Skirball Fire nearly spread to the Getty Center, when an ember drifted over to the Getty hill on December 6. The damp earth, soaked with 1.2 million gallons of water from the Getty's network of irrigation pipes, is said to have prevented the fire from spreading and it was put out by the fire department with no further damage. During the January 2025 Southern California wildfires, the Getty Center was placed in the mandatory evacuation zone due to the spread of the Palisades Fire.

== Panoramic view looking south ==
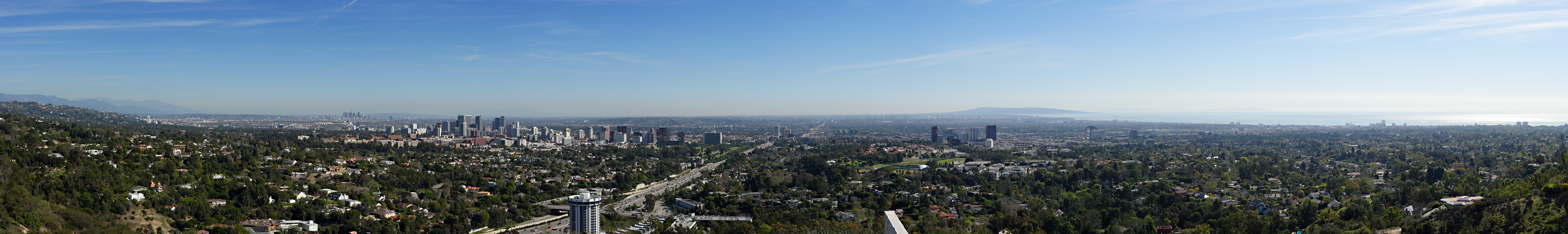
A near 180-degree panoramic view of Los Angeles looking south from the Getty on an exceptionally clear day
