= Getty Foundation =

American arts organization in Los Angeles, California

- The Getty Center in 2024, where the Getty Foundation is based
- Parent institution: J. Paul Getty Trust1985
- Established: 1984
- Address: 1200 Getty Center Drive, Los Angeles, CA 90049
- Location: Los Angeles, California, United States
- Coordinates: 34°04′39″N 118°28′30″W
- Interactive map of Getty Foundation

The Getty Foundation is an organization based in Los Angeles, California at the Getty Center, which awards grants for "the understanding and preservation of the visual arts". In the past, it funded the Getty Leadership Institute for "current and future museum leaders", which is now at Claremont Graduate University. Its budget for 2006–07 was $27.8 million. It is part of the J. Paul Getty Trust.

== History ==
The Foundation was originally called the "Getty Grant Program", which began in 1984 under the direction of Deborah Marrow. Marrow was a long-time director of the foundation until her death in 2019. By 1990 the Getty Grant Program (then based in Santa Monica) had made 530 grants totaling $20 million to "art historians, conservators and art museums in 18 countries".

In 1993, the Foundation launched the Multicultural Undergraduate Internship Program to increase staff diversity within visual arts organizations in Los Angeles County. In 2016, a white woman sued the foundation for refusing her application for a museum internship program that’s explicitly open only to minority groups.

In 1998, the Program granted $750,000 for electronic cataloging to art museums in the Los Angeles area. The program awarded $180,000 in 1999 to the National Gallery in Prague to digitize images of works of art in its collections. In 2005, the program awarded the University of California, Los Angeles, and the Museum of Fine Arts, Houston, almost $400,000 to "support the documentation and preservation of Latino and Latin American art".

The name of the Getty Grant Program was changed to "Getty Foundation" in 2005.

Between 2002 and 2007, the Foundation spent over $13.5 million to fund "plans to care for, maintain, and preserve ... historic resources" at 86 United States colleges and universities. In 2006, the Foundation committed $3.5 million to restore an 80 by 100 foot "America Tropical" mural on Olvera Street in Los Angeles that was painted by David Alfaro Siqueiros. In the aftermath of Hurricane Katrina, the Foundation announced a $2 million fund "to aid New Orleans's visual arts organizations".

A major Getty initiative for 2011–12 was Pacific Standard Time: Art in LA 1945–1980, an unprecedented collaboration that brought together more than sixty cultural institutions from across Southern California for six months to tell the story of the birth of the L.A. art scene.

In 2018, the Getty Foundation launched a new program, the Conserving Canvas, specialized in the conservation and restoration of paintings.

In May 2022, it was announced that Christie’s auction house will be selling the Ann and Gordon Getty Collection though a series of auctions starting in October 2022. The proceeds from the sale of the collection estimated at $180 million over nearly 1,500 pieces of art, will be donated to the Ann and Gordon Getty Foundation for the Arts.

== Grants ==
=== Budget ===
The J. Paul Getty Trust can spend up to 0.75% of its endowment on gifts and grants. During the period July 2006 – June 2007, the Foundation had approximately 30 full-time and part-time employees, and a budget of $27.8 million.

As of June 2008, the Foundation has four priorities for grants:

- "Strengthening art history as a global discipline"
- "Promoting the interdisciplinary practice of conservation"
- "Increasing access to museum and archival collections"
- "Developing current and future professionals and leaders"

=== Books ===
Among notable grants of the Program were grants to partially fund the publication of books, for example to "provide for additional illustrations or allow a book's purchase price to be lowered". Some books "published with the assistance of the Getty Grant Program" were:

- Hamburger, Jeffrey F. The Rothschild canticles: art and mysticism in Flanders and the Rhineland circa 1300. New Haven: Yale University Press, 1990. ISBN 0-300-04308-2
- Nesbit, Molly, and Eugène Atget. Atget's seven albums. New Haven: Yale University Press, 1992. ISBN 0-300-03580-2
- Jones, Amelia, and Laura Cottingham. Sexual politics: Judy Chicago's Dinner Party in feminist art history. [Los Angeles, CA]: UCLA at the Armand Hammer Museum of Art and Cultural Center in association with University of California Press, Berkeley, 1996. ISBN 0-520-20565-0

=== Staff diversity in culture ===
Grants made by the Foundation include funding the Multicultural Undergraduate Internship Program, begun in 1993, "seeks to increase staff diversity within visual arts organizations" in Los Angeles County.

In the summer of 2011, the foundation funded Multicultural Undergraduate Internships at 70 Los Angeles-area museums and visual arts organizations. The internships seek to attract into museum and visual arts organizations students from historically underrepresented groups: people of African American, Asian, Latino/Hispanic, Native American, and Pacific Islander descent.

In 2016, the foundation issued a $8.5 million grant to push more Latino and Latin American-themed shows in South California.

=== Keeping It Modern Grant ===
On 16 September 2014, the Getty Foundation announced the launch of the Keeping It Modern grant to help preserve modernist architecture worldwide. The Centennial Hall in Poland was one of the first recipients of the grant ($200,000).

In 2018, the grant was distributed to The National Art Schools in Cuba, the Rashid Karami International Fairground in Tripoli, the Gateway Arch in St. Louis, the Historical Museum of Bosnia and Herzegovina, the Chess Palace and Alpine Club in Tbilisi, the Salk Institute for Biological Studies in La Jolla, the St. Brendan's Community School in Birr, the Technische Universiteit Delft Auditorium in the Netherlands, the School of Mathematics of the Sapienza University of Rome, the University of Urbino, and the Engineering Building at the University of Leicester.

In 2019, the grant was distributed to Buzludzha Monument, in Bulgaria; North Christian Church, in Columbus, Indiana; Miller House and Garden, Columbus, Indiana; Laboratory for Faculty of Chemical Technology at Kaunas University of Technology, Lithuania; Uganda National Museum, Kampala, Uganda; Politecnico di Torino Torino Esposizioni, Torino, Italy; Escuela Superior de Comercio Manuel Belgrano, in Córdoba, Argentina; Beira Railway Station, Beira, Mozambique; and Paraninfo de la Universidad Laboral de Cheste, Cheste, Spain.

=== Art History international fellowships ===
Every year, the Getty Foundation awards Art History international fellowships ($60,000 plus $5,000 for research and travel expenses), in partnership with the American Council of Learned Societies.

== Black Visual Arts Archives ==
In 2025, the Getty Foundation awarded $1.5 million to seven different American libraries, museums, and universities as part of its Black Visual Arts Archives program. Recipients included: Amistad Research Center, California State University Los Angeles, Clark Atlanta University, Emory University, Lincoln University, the Smithsonian’s Anacostia Community Museum, and Visual AIDS.

== Getty Leadership Institute at Claremont Graduate University ==
The Foundation also sponsors the Getty Leadership Institute (GLI). The major GLI program is the Museum Leadership Institute (MLI), formerly known as the Museum Management Institute, which "has served close to 1,000 museum professionals from the United States and 30 countries worldwide". It offers a three-week curriculum for "museum directors and senior executive team members", with instruction in areas such as "strategy, marketing, management and finance". Most of the attendees work in art museums; among the executives who attended the MLI were the directors of the Frick Collection, San Francisco Museum of Modern Art, Van Gogh Museum, and Winnipeg Art Gallery.

In addition to the MLI, GLI offers other professional development programs, convenes meetings involving non-profit agencies, and hosts an online forum. The GLI began in 1979 with a headquarters in New York City and classes taught at the University of California Berkeley. From 1999 to 2009, the program was headquartered at the Getty Center in Los Angeles, California, and in 2004, classes moved from Berkeley to the Getty Center. In 2010, the GLI affiliated with Claremont Graduate University in Claremont, California and was renamed The Getty Leadership Institute at Claremont Graduate University. After the transfer, the foundation supports the GLI with a three-year, $2.2 million grant, but the program is headquartered on the Claremont campus. Claremont is funding GLI's indirect costs. Although the transfer took effect on January 2, 2010, the 2010 MLI was held at the Getty Center. The 2011 MLI was to be held on the Claremont campus.

== Senior staff ==
The Foundation's senior staff includes:

- Joan Weinstein, Interim Director
- Associate Director, Grants Administration: Rebecca Martin
- Program Officer: Angie Kim
- Senior Program Officer: Nancy Micklewright
- Program Officer: Antoine M. Wilmering
- Head, Leadership Institute: Philip M. Nowlen
- Principal Project Specialist: Kathleen Johnson

== Foundation with similar name ==
- The "Ann and Gordon Getty Foundation" is based in San Francisco, California and awards grants to promote the fields of music, the opera, and the symphony.
- The Getty Research Institute is based in Los Angeles, California, and dedicated to furthering knowledge and advancing understanding of the visual arts.
- The Getty Conservation Institute is based in Los Angeles, California, and dedicated to advancing conservation practice.
- The J. Paul Getty Trust is the trust fund that oversees all Getty-branded programs and institutions.
