= K. Terry Dornbush =

American diplomat (1933–2024)

Kirk Terry Dornbush

60th United States Ambassador to the Netherlands
- In office March 16, 1994 – July 28, 1998
- President: Bill Clinton
- Preceded by: C. Howard Wilkins Jr.
- Succeeded by: Cynthia P. Schneider

Personal details
- Born: October 31, 1933 Atlanta, Georgia, U.S.
- Died: November 21, 2024 (aged 91)
- Education: Vanderbilt University

Kirk Terry Dornbush (October 31, 1933 – November 21, 2024) was an American diplomat. He served as United States Ambassador to the Netherlands from 1994 until 1998.

Dornbush was born in Atlanta, Georgia in 1933. He earned his B.A. degree from Vanderbilt University. Dornbush died on November 21, 2024, at the age of 91.

Diplomatic posts
Preceded by C. Howard Wilkins, Jr.	60th United States Ambassador to the Netherlands; 1994–1998	Succeeded by Cynthia P. Schneider
