= Mutual Fund Directors Forum =

The Mutual Fund Directors Forum (MFDF) is a non-profit organization serving independent mutual fund directors in the United States.

== Overview ==
The MFDF was formed in 2002, growing out of the Mutual Fund Directors Education Council, a partnership between the United States Securities and Exchange Commission (SEC) and the mutual fund industry. The council was convened in 1999, in response to SEC chairman Arthur Levitt's call for improved fund governance and better education of mutual fund directors.

Although all persons in the mutual fund industry are able to participate in the Forum's events, actual membership in the Forum is restricted to independent directors or trustees of mutual funds. Today, the Forum's primary activities are the creation and production of educational programs, the publication of reports on best practice guidance, and advocacy on behalf of its members. For example, in 2003, the Forum was asked by the then SEC Chairman William H. Donaldson to prepare best practice guidance in key areas of director decision-making, such as monitoring fees and conflicts, overseeing compliance, and important issues such as valuation and pricing of fund portfolio securities and fund shares. In response to this request, the Forum published its "Report of the Mutual Fund Directors Forum on Best Practices and Practical Guidance for Mutual Fund Directors" in July 2004. The report was well received by the SEC. Frequently, members of the Forum's staff are consulted and quoted by the financial press in news stories concerning mutual fund directors and the mutual fund industry as a whole. In addition, op-ed letters by Forum staff on topics important to the mutual fund industry have appeared in the Wall Street Journal and mutual fund industry publications.

Significantly, in 2002, the Mutual Fund Directors Forum applied for and received an exemptive order from the SEC allowing the payment by mutual funds, pursuant to the authorization of their boards of directors, of the dues of their independent directors for membership in the Forum, as well as Forum-related expenses; and finding that these payments do not violate Section 17(d) and Rule 17d-1 of the Investment Company Act of 1940, which prohibit funds from participating in joint transactions with affiliated persons on a basis different from or less advantageous than that of any other participant.
