= List of Harvard Law School alumni =

This is a list of notable alumni of Harvard Law School.

== Government ==
=== United States government ===
==== Executive branch ====
===== U.S. presidents =====
Barack Obama

- Rutherford B. Hayes, 19th president of the United States
- Barack Obama, 44th president of the United States

===== U.S. attorneys general =====
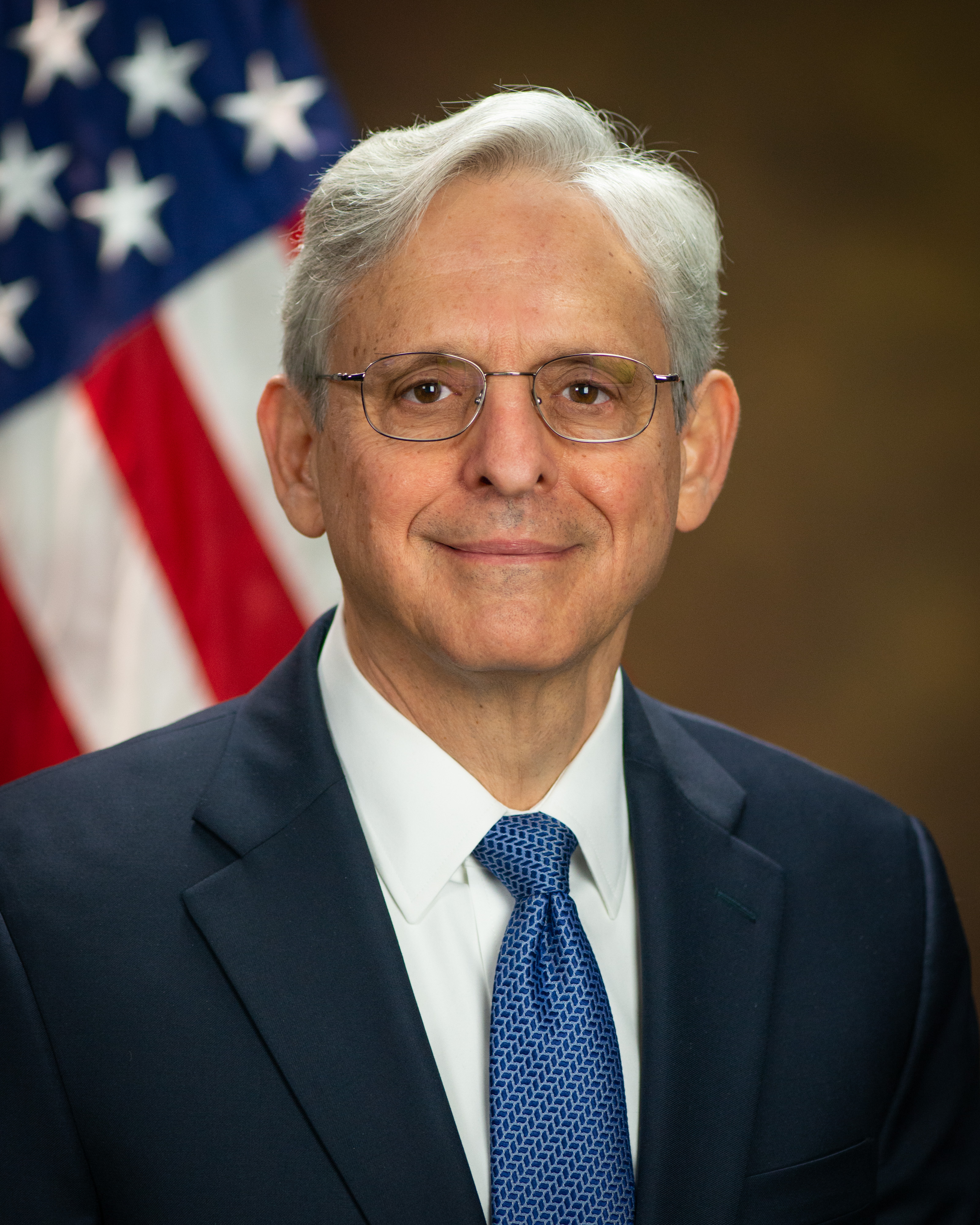
Merrick Garland

- Francis Biddle
- Charles Joseph Bonaparte, also United States secretary of the Navy and founder of the precursor to the FBI
- William M. Evarts, also secretary of state and senator from New York
- Merrick Garland, also former chief judge, United States Court of Appeals for the District of Columbia Circuit
- Alberto Gonzales
- Ebenezer R. Hoar
- Richard Kleindienst
- Loretta Lynch
- Richard Olney, later also secretary of state
- Janet Reno
- Elliot Richardson
- William French Smith

===== Other cabinet and cabinet-level officials =====
- Spencer Abraham, secretary of energy, senator from Michigan
- Elliott Abrams, deputy National Security advisor
- Dean Acheson, secretary of state; instrumental in the creation of Lend-Lease, the Marshall Plan, NATO, the International Monetary Fund and the World Bank, together with the precursors of the European Union and the World Trade Organization, and influential in the decision to enter the Korean War
- Alexander Acosta, secretary of labor
- Brock Adams, secretary of transportation, senator and representative from Washington
- Charles Francis Adams III, secretary of the Navy
- Bruce Babbitt, secretary of the interior, governor of Arizona
- William Bennett, secretary of education, and director of the Office of National Drug Control Policy
- Sandy Berger, National Security advisor
- Charles Joseph Bonaparte, secretary of the Navy, United States attorney general, founded the precursor to the Federal Bureau of Investigation
- Joseph Califano, secretary of Health, Education, and Welfare
- John Chafee, secretary of the Navy, governor of Rhode Island, senator from Rhode Island
- Michael Chertoff, secretary of Homeland Security
- William Thaddeus Coleman Jr., secretary of transportation
- John Thomas Connor, secretary of commerce
- Elizabeth Dole, secretary of labor, secretary of transportation, senator from North Carolina
- James Freis, global fraud expert and former director of the Financial Crimes Enforcement Network
- Ron Klain, White House chief of staff (2021–); chief of staff to Vice President Joe Biden (2008–11)
- Robert Todd Lincoln, secretary of war, ambassador to the United Kingdom
- Ray Mabus, secretary of the Navy
- Ogden L. Mills, United States secretary of the treasury
- Mike Pompeo, secretary of state (2018–2021), director of the Central Intelligence Agency (2017–2018)
- Samantha Power, U.S. permanent representative to the United Nations
- William Ruckelshaus, administrator of the Environmental Protection Agency (1970–73; 1983–85)
- Henry L. Stimson, secretary of state, secretary of war, governor general of the Philippines
- Caspar Weinberger, secretary of defense (1981–1987)
- W. Willard Wirtz, secretary of labor (1962–1969)
- Robert Zoellick, deputy secretary of state, United States trade representative, president of the World Bank

==== Legislative branch (U.S. Congress) ====
===== Senators =====
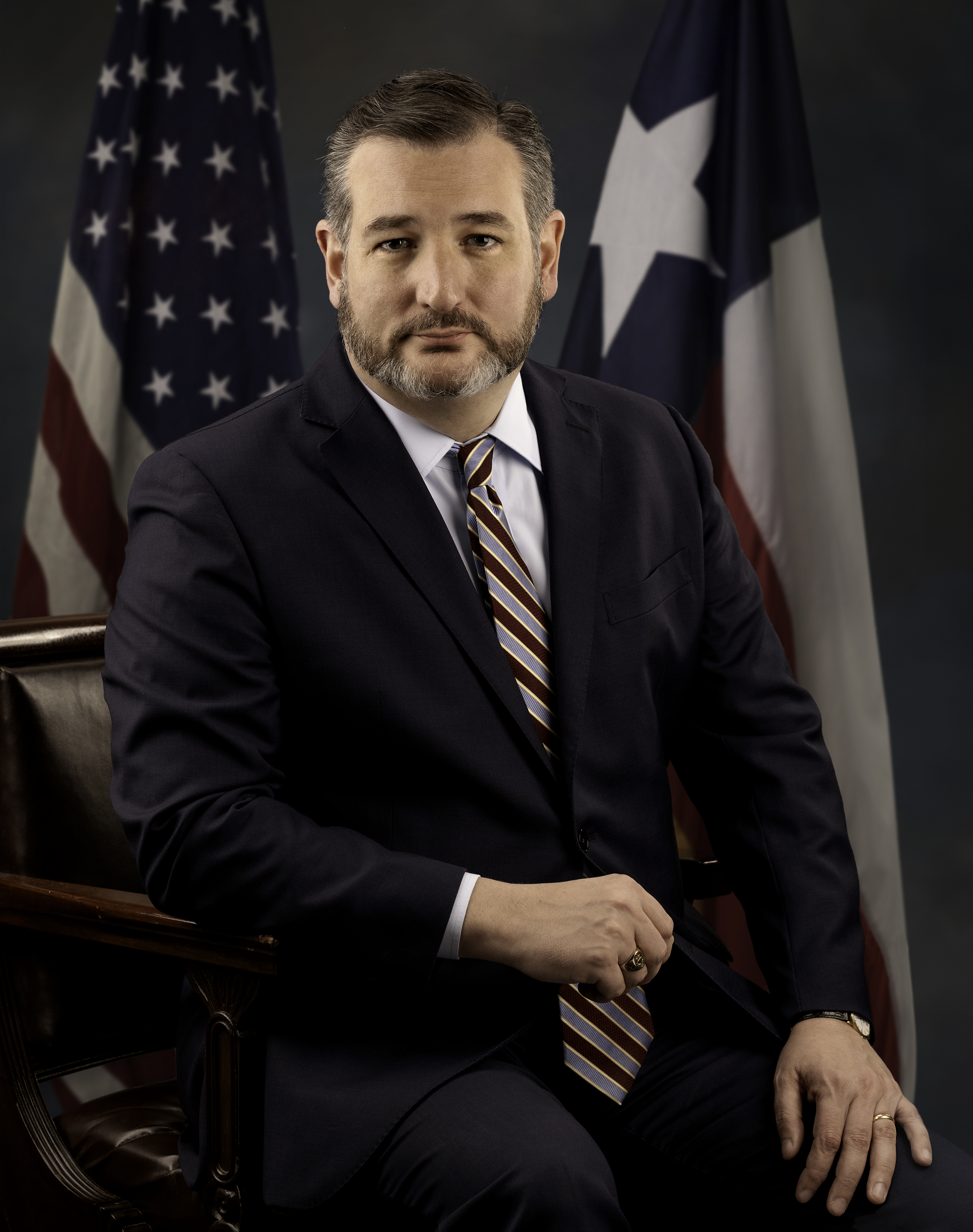
Ted Cruz

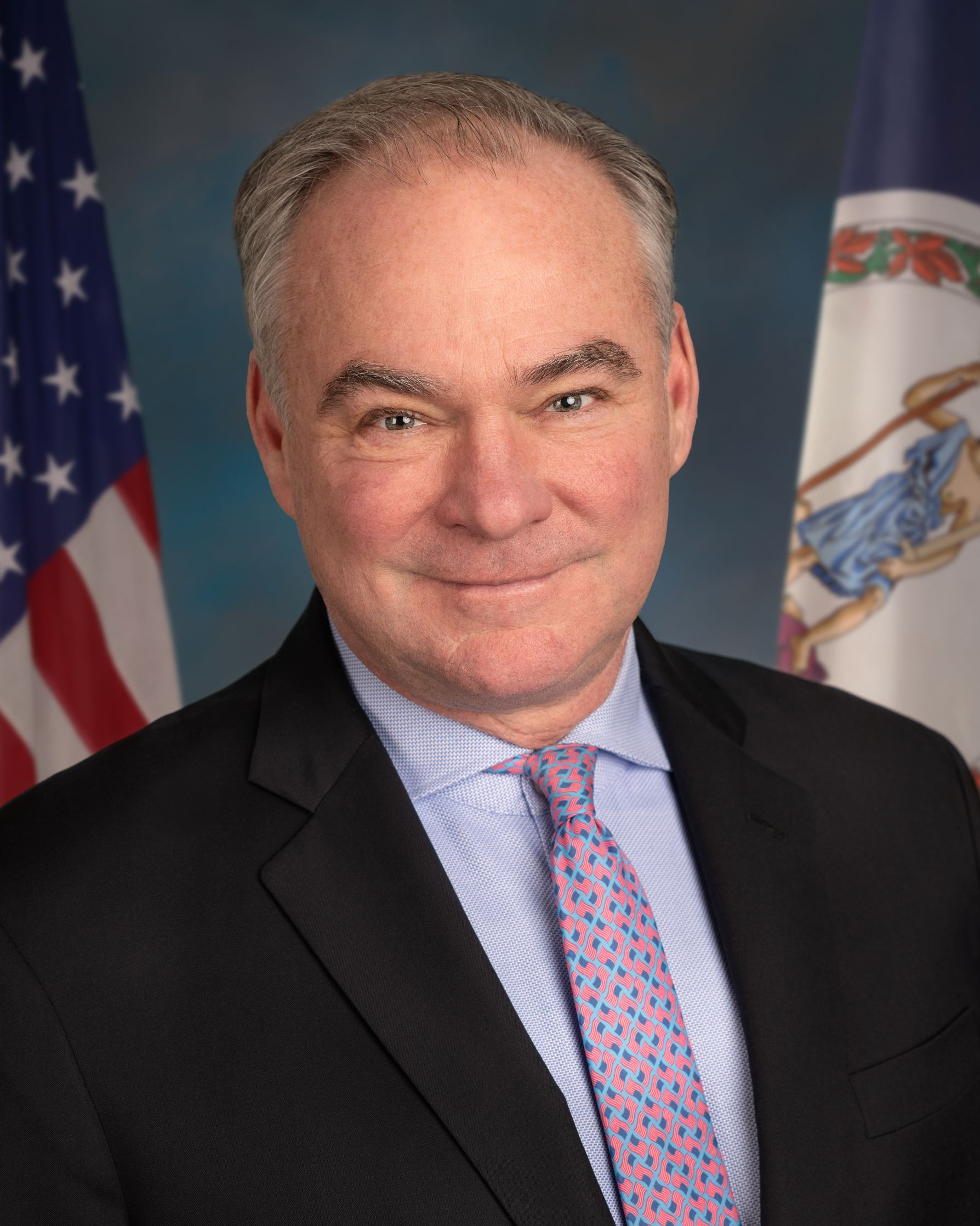
Tim Kaine

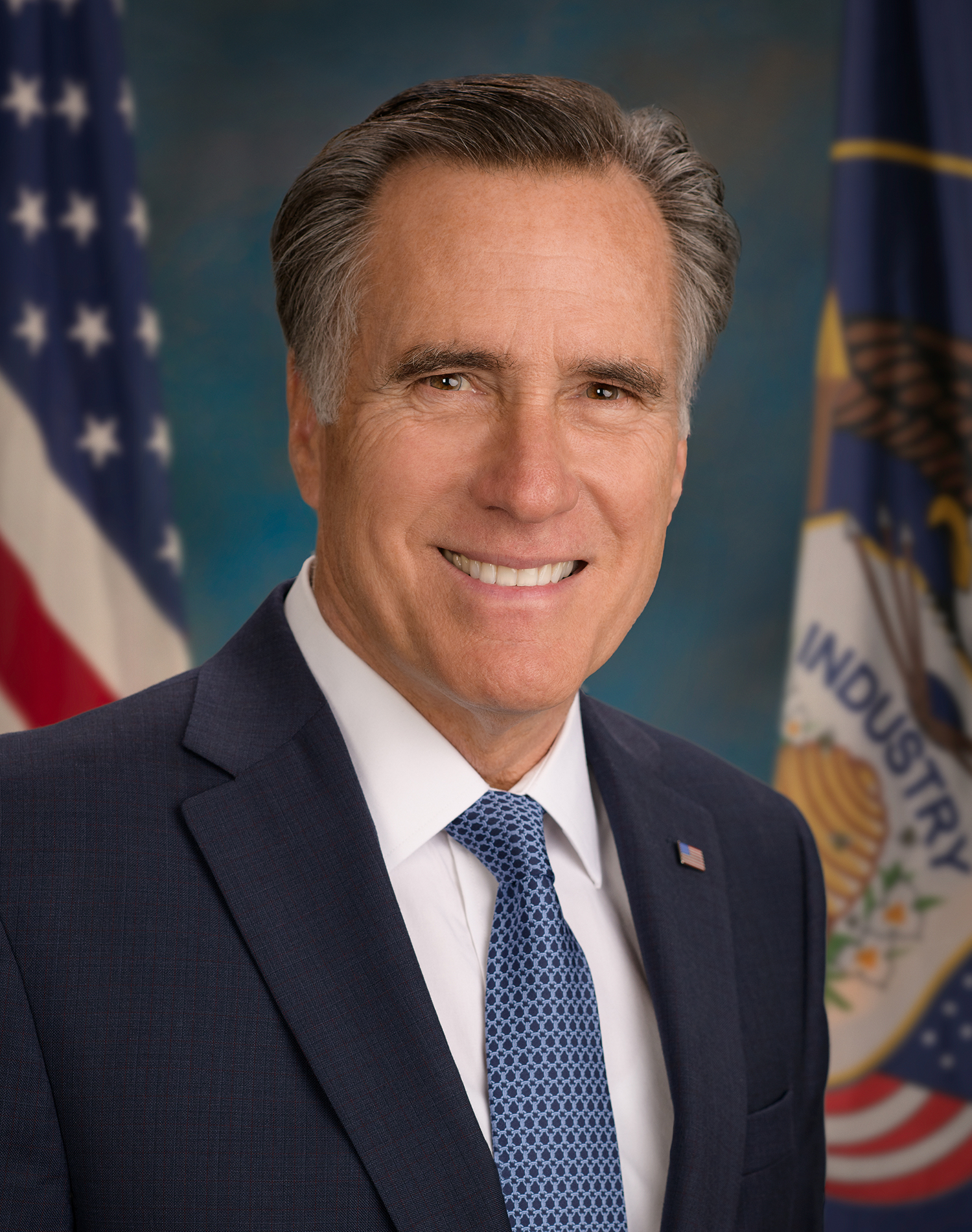
Mitt Romney

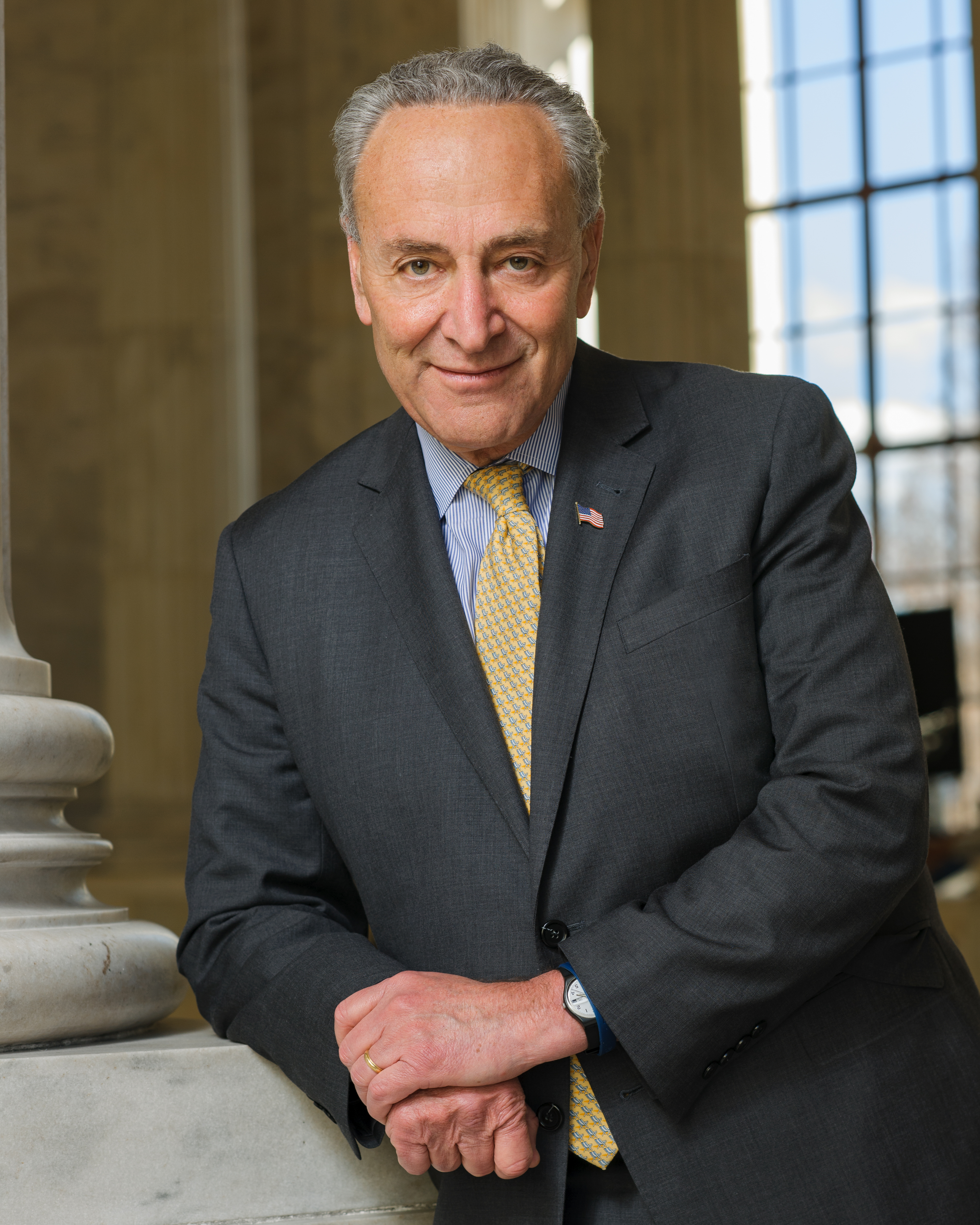
Chuck Schumer

- Spencer Abraham, senator from Michigan (1995–2001), United States secretary of energy (2001–05)
- Brock Adams, senator (1987–1993) and representative (1965–1977) from Washington, United States secretary of transportation (1977–79)
- Ralph Owen Brewster, senator from Maine (1941–1952), governor of Maine (1925–1929)
- John Chafee, senator from Rhode Island (1976–1999), governor of Rhode Island (1963–69), Secretary of the Navy (1969–72)
- Tom Cotton, Arkansas senator (2015–present) and representative (2013–2015)
- Mike Crapo, senator (1999–present) and representative (1993–1999) from Idaho
- Ted Cruz, senator (2013–present) from Texas
- Elizabeth Dole, senator from North Carolina (2003–2009), secretary of labor (1989–1990), secretary of transportation (1983–1987)
- Thomas Eagleton, senator from Missouri (1968–1987), Democratic vice presidential nominee (1972)
- Sam Ervin, senator from North Carolina (1954–1974)
- Russ Feingold, senator from Wisconsin (1993–2011)
- George G. Fogg, senator from New Hampshire (1866–1867)
- Hiram Leong Fong, senator from Hawaii (1959–1977)
- David H. Gambrell, senator from Georgia (1971–1972)
- Frederick H. Gillett, U.S. senator (1925–1931) and U.S. representative (1893–1925) from Massachusetts, speaker of the House (1919–1925)
- Bob Graham, senator from Florida (1987–2005), governor of Florida (1979–87)
- George Frisbie Hoar, senator from Massachusetts (1877–1904)
- Jim Jeffords, senator from Vermont (1989–2007)
- Tim Kaine, senator from Virginia (2013–present), governor of Virginia (2006–2010), Democratic vice presidential nominee (2016)
- Kenneth Keating, senator (1959–1965) and representative (1953–1959) from New York
- Carl Levin, senator from Michigan (1979–2015)
- Henry Cabot Lodge, senator (1893–1924) and representative (1887–1893) from Massachusetts
- Spark Matsunaga, senator (1977–1990) and representative (1971–1977) from Hawaii
- Claude Pepper, senator (1936–1951) and representative (1963–1989) from Florida
- Larry Pressler, senator from South Dakota (1979–1997)
- Jack Reed, senator from Rhode Island (1997–present)
- Mitt Romney, senator from Utah (2019–present), governor of Massachusetts (2003-2007)
- William Roth, senator (1971–2001) and representative (1967–1970) from Delaware
- Leverett Saltonstall, senator from Massachusetts (1945–1967), governor of Massachusetts (1939–45)
- Paul Sarbanes, senator (1977–2007) and representative (1971–1977) from Maryland
- Chuck Schumer, senator (1999–present) and representative (1981–99) from New York
- Ted Stevens, senator from Alaska (1968–2009)
- Adlai Stevenson III, senator from Illinois (1970–1981)
- Charles Sumner, senator from Massachusetts (1851–1874)
- Robert Taft Jr. (L.L.B. 1942), senator (1971–1976) and representative (1967–71) from Ohio
- Robert A. Taft, senator from Ohio (1939–1953)
- Mark Warner, U.S. senator from Virginia (2009–present), governor of Virginia (2002–2006)

===== Representatives =====
- Richard S. Aldrich, Rhode Island (1923–1933)
- Tom Allen, Maine (1997–2009)
- John Anderson, Illinois (1961–1981) and independent candidate in the 1980 presidential election
- John Barrow, Georgia (2005–2015)
- Anthony Brown, Maryland (2017–present) and lieutenant governor of Maryland (2009–2016)
- Anson Burlingame, Massachusetts (1855–1861)
- Tom Campbell, California (1989–1993, 1995–2001) and dean of the Haas School of Business
- Joaquin Castro, Texas (2013–present)
- Patrick A. Collins, Massachusetts (1883–1889), mayor of Boston, Massachusetts (1902–1905)
- Jim Cooper, Tennessee (1983–present)
- Christopher Cox, California (1989–2005), chairman of the Securities and Exchange Commission (2005–2009)
- William C. Cramer, Florida (1955–1971)
- Artur Davis, Alabama (2003–2011)
- William Thomas Ellis, Kentucky (1889–1895)
- George Eustis, Louisiana (1855–1859)
- Daniel J. Flood, Pennsylvania (1945–1947, 1949–1953, 1955–1980)
- Barney Frank, Massachusetts (1981–2012)
- Josh Gottheimer, New Jersey (2017–present)
- Alan Grayson, Florida (2009–2017)
- Jane Harman, California (1993–1999; 2001–2011)
- Bill Jefferson, Louisiana (1991–2009)
- Joseph P. Kennedy III, Massachusetts (2013–2021)
- Sander Levin, Michigan (1983–2019)
- Walter I. McCoy, New Jersey (1911–1914)
- Tom Petri, Wisconsin (1979–2015)
- John Sarbanes, Maryland (2007–present)
- Adam Schiff, California (2001–present)
- Pat Schroeder, Colorado (1973–1997); first woman elected to position
- Terri Sewell, Alabama (2011–present)
- Brad Sherman, California (1997–present)
- William H. Sowden, Pennsylvania (1885–1889)
- Sylvester Turner, Texas (2025), mayor of Houston (2016–2024), member of the Texas House of Representatives (1989–2016).
- Juan Vargas, California (2013–present)
- Laurence Hawley Watres, Pennsylvania (1923–1931)

==== Judicial branch ====
===== Supreme Court justices =====
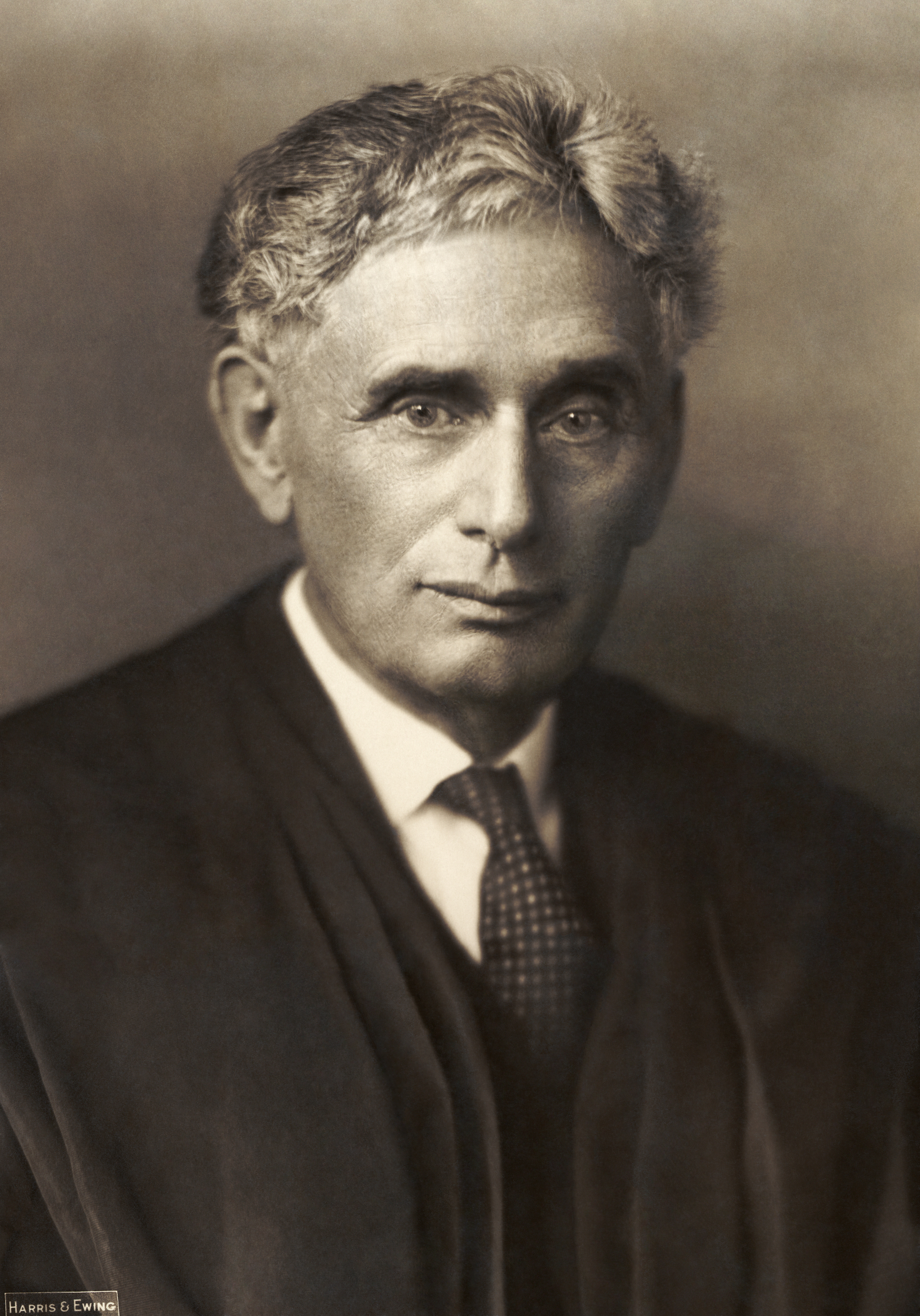
Louis Brandeis

- Harry Blackmun
- Louis Brandeis
- William Brennan
- Stephen Breyer
- Harold Hitz Burton
- Benjamin Curtis
- Felix Frankfurter
- Neil Gorsuch (sitting)
- Horace Gray
- Oliver Wendell Holmes Jr.
- Ketanji Brown Jackson (sitting)
- Elena Kagan (sitting)
- Anthony Kennedy
- Lewis Powell
- John Roberts (chief justice, sitting)
- Edward T. Sanford
- Antonin Scalia
- David Souter

===== Federal court judges =====
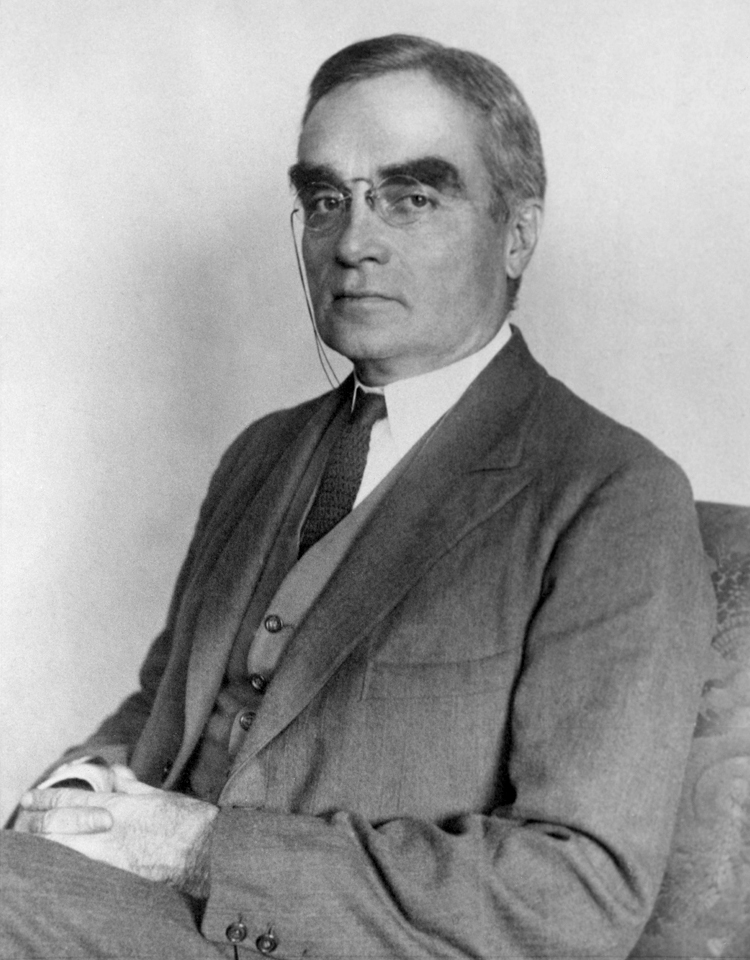
Learned Hand

- R. Lanier Anderson III, circuit judge, United States Court of Appeals for the Eleventh Circuit
- Christine Arguello (1980), district judge, United States District Court for the District of Colorado
- Morris S. Arnold, senior circuit judge, Eighth Circuit Court of Appeals based in Little Rock
- Richard S. Arnold, circuit judge, Eighth Circuit Court of Appeals; federal courthouse in Little Rock bears his name
- David J. Barron (J.D. 1994), circuit judge, United States Court of Appeals for the First Circuit
- John R. Bartels, United States District Court for the Eastern District of New York
- Deborah Batts, former district judge, United States District Court for the Southern District of New York
- Cathy Bissoon (J.D. 1993), district judge, United States District Court for the Western District of Pennsylvania
- Victor Allen Bolden (J.D. 1989), district judge, United States District Court for the District of Connecticut
- Michael Boudin (LL.B. 1964), senior judge, United States Court of Appeals for the First Circuit
- Andrew L. Brasher (J.D. 2006), circuit judge, United States Court of Appeals for the Eleventh Circuit
- Vernon S. Broderick (J.D. 1988), district judge, United States District Court for the Southern District of New York
- Patrick J. Bumatay (J.D. 2006), circuit judge, United States Court of Appeals for the Ninth Circuit
- John K. Bush (J.D. 1989), circuit judge, United States Court of Appeals for the Sixth Circuit
- Edward Earl Carnes (J.D. 1975), circuit judge, United States Court of Appeals for the Eleventh Circuit
- Susan L. Carney (J.D. 1977), circuit judge, United States Court of Appeals for the Second Circuit
- Andrew L. Carter Jr. (J.D. 1994), district judge, United States District Court for the Southern District of New York
- Denise J. Casper (J.D. 1994), district judge, United States District Court for the District of Massachusetts
- Herbert Young Cho Choy (J.D. 1941), circuit judge, United States Court of Appeals for the Ninth Circuit
- Theodore D. Chuang (J.D. 1994), district judge, United States District Court for the District of Maryland
- Geoffrey W. Crawford (J.D. 1980), chief judge, United States District Court for the District of Vermont
- Tiffany P. Cunningham (J.D. 2001), circuit judge, United States Court of Appeals for the Federal Circuit
- Paul A. Engelmayer (J.D. 1987), district judge, United States District Court for the Southern District of New York
- Katherine Polk Failla (J.D. 1993), district judge, United States District Court for the Southern District of New York
- Beth Labson Freeman (J.D. 1979), district judge, United States District Court for the Northern District of California
- Henry Friendly (LL.B. 1927), circuit judge, United States Court of Appeals for the Second Circuit, 1959–1974; senior circuit judge, 1974–1976
- John P. Fullam (LL.B. 1948), former district judge, United States District Court for the Eastern District of Pennsylvania
- Marvin J. Garbis (J.D. 1961), district judge, United States District Court for the District of Maryland
- James Knoll Gardner (J.D. 1965), district judge, United States District Court for the Eastern District of Pennsylvania
- Mark A. Goldsmith (J.D. 1977), district judge, United States District Court for the Eastern District of Michigan
- Andrew Patrick Gordon (J.D. 1987), district judge, United States District Court for the District of Nevada
- Myron L. Gordon, district judge, United States District Court for the Eastern District of Wisconsin
- Joseph A. Greenaway (J.D. 1981), circuit judge, United States Court of Appeals for the Third Circuit
- Learned Hand (LL.B. 1896), circuit judge, United States Court of Appeals for the Second Circuit
- George C. Hanks Jr. (J.D. 1989), district judge, United States District Court for the Southern District of Texas
- Harris Hartz (J.D. 1972), circuit judge, United States Court of Appeals for the Tenth Circuit
- Amy Berman Jackson (J.D. 1979), district judge, United States District Court for the District of Columbia
- R. Brooke Jackson (J.D. 1972), district judge, United States District Court for the District of Colorado
- Michael J. Juneau (J.D. 1987), district judge, United States District Court for the Western District of Louisiana
- Gregory G. Katsas (J.D. 1989), circuit judge, United States Court of Appeals for the District of Columbia Circuit
- William J. Kayatta Jr. (J.D. 1979), circuit judge, United States Court of Appeals for the First Circuit
- Jane L. Kelly (J.D. 1991), circuit judge, United States Court of Appeals for the Eighth Circuit
- Matthew Kennelly (J.D. 1981), district judge, United States District Court for the Northern District of Illinois
- Whitman Knapp (LL.B. 1934, district judge, United States District Court for the Southern District of New York; investigated corruption in the NYPD
- Jonathan A. Kobes (J.D. 2000), circuit judge, United States Court of Appeals for the Eighth Circuit
- Lucy Koh (J.D. 1993), district judge, United States District Court for the Northern District of California
- William Francis Kuntz (J.D. 1979), district judge, United States District Court for the Eastern District of New York
- Dominic W. Lanza (J.D. 2002), district judge, United States District Court for the District of Arizona
- John Z. Lee (J.D. 1992), district judge, United States District Court for the Northern District of Illinois
- Kenneth K. Lee (J.D. 2000), circuit judge, United States Court of Appeals for the Ninth Circuit
- Matthew Frederick Leitman (J.D. 1993), district judge, United States District Court for the Eastern District of Michigan
- Pierre Leval (J.D. 1963), senior judge, United States Court of Appeals for the Second Circuit
- Gregory E. Maggs (J.D. 1988), judge, United States Court of Appeals for the Armed Forces
- D. Price Marshall Jr. (J.D. 1989), chief judge, United States District Court for the Eastern District of Arkansas
- Patricia Millett (J.D. 1988), circuit judge, United States Court of Appeals for the District of Columbia Circuit
- Kevin Newsom (J.D. 1997), circuit judge, United States Court of Appeals for the Eleventh Circuit
- John T. Noonan Jr. (LL.B. 1954), senior judge, United States Court of Appeals for the Ninth Circuit
- Andy Oldham (J.D. 2005), circuit judge, United States Court of Appeals for the Fifth Circuit
- Diarmuid O'Scannlain (J.D. 1963), senior judge, United States Court of Appeals for the Ninth Circuit
- Cornelia Pillard (J.D. 1987), circuit judge, United States Court of Appeals for the District of Columbia Circuit
- Richard A. Posner (LL.B. 1962), circuit judge, United States Court of Appeals for the Seventh Circuit
- Jed S. Rakoff (J.D. 1969), senior judge, United States District Court for the Southern District of New York
- Edgardo Ramos (J.D. 1987), district judge, United States District Court for the Southern District of New York
- Thomas Morrow Reavley (J.D.1948), senior circuit judge, United States Court of Appeals for the Fifth Circuit
- Lee Rudofsky (J.D. 2005), district judge, United States District Court for the Eastern District of Arkansas
- Bruce Marshall Selya (LL.B. 1958), senior judge, United States Court of Appeals for the First Circuit
- Laurence Silberman (J.D. 1961), senior judge, United States Court of Appeals for the District of Columbia Circuit
- Michael H. Simon (J.D. 1981), district judge, United States District Court for the District of Oregon
- James R. Spencer (J.D 1974), senior judge, United States District Court for the Eastern District of Virginia
- Josephine Staton (J.D. 1986), district judge, United States District Court for the Central District of California
- A. Wallace Tashima (LL.B. 1961), third Asian-American to be appointed to the United States Court of Appeals
- Amy Totenberg (J.D. 1977), district judge, United States District Court for the Northern District of Georgia
- Lawrence VanDyke (J.D. 2005), circuit judge, United States Court of Appeals for the Ninth Circuit
- Lawrence J. Vilardo (J.D. 1980), district judge, United States District Court for the Western District of New York
- Justin R. Walker (J.D. 2009), district judge, United States District Court for the Western District of Kentucky
- Derrick Watson (J.D. 1991), district judge, United States District Court for the District of Hawaii
- Robert L. Wilkins (J.D. 1989), circuit judge, United States Court of Appeals for the District of Columbia Circuit
- Mark L. Wolf (J.D. 1971), senior judge, United States District Court for the District of Massachusetts
- Joshua Wolson (J.D. 1999), district judge, United States District Court for the Eastern District of Pennsylvania
- Kimba Wood (J.D. 1969), senior judge, United States District Court for the Southern District of New York
- Wilhelmina Wright (J.D. 1989), district judge, United States District Court for the District of Minnesota

==== State government ====
===== Governors =====
- Bruce Babbitt, governor of Arizona, United States secretary of the interior
- Percival Proctor Baxter (1901), governor of Maine (1921–1925)
- Owen Brewster, governor of Maine, senator from Maine
- John Chafee, governor of Rhode Island, senator from Rhode Island, secretary of the Navy
- Ron DeSantis, governor of Florida, former member of the United States House of Representatives (JD, 2005)
- Jim Doyle, governor of Wisconsin
- Pierre S. du Pont, IV, governor of Delaware; U.S. representative from Delaware
- Michael Dukakis, governor of Massachusetts; Democratic presidential nominee (1988)
- Joseph B. Ely, governor of Massachusetts (1931–1935)
- Bob Graham, governor of Florida, senator from Florida
- Jennifer Granholm, governor of Michigan
- Deval Patrick, governor of Massachusetts
- Sylvester Pennoyer, governor of Oregon
- Robert E. Quinn, governor of Rhode Island and judge for the Rhode Island Superior Court
- Leverett Saltonstall, governor of Massachusetts, senator from Massachusetts
- Eliot Spitzer, governor of New York
- Bruce Sundlun, governor of Rhode Island
- Aníbal Acevedo Vilá, governor of the Commonwealth of Puerto Rico
- William Weld, governor of Massachusetts

===== State politicians =====
- Michael G. Adams, secretary of state of Kentucky
- John O. Bailey, state senator and representative in Oregon, chief justice of the Oregon Supreme Court
- F. Elliott Barber Jr., Vermont attorney general
- Brent Barton, state representative of Oregon
- Mike Beltran, Florida state representative; litigator
- Daniel Bigelow, served in first legislature of Washington Territory, 1854
- Roswell B. Burchard, 1903, lieutenant governor of Rhode Island 1913–1915
- Wendy Davis, Texas state senator and 2014 Democratic gubernatorial nominee
- Richard Priest Dietzman, chief justice of the Kentucky Court of Appeals
- Abram Ellenbogen, New York state assemblyman
- Jesse Gabriel, state assemblyman of California
- Raj Goyle, candidate for New York state comptroller; former state representative
- Craig Greenberg (born 1973), businessman, lawyer, and politician; mayor of Louisville
- Harold Groves, state senator and assemblyman of Wisconsin
- George Howe, state's attorney of Windham County, United States attorney for the District of Vermont, member of the Vermont Senate
- Brad Hoylman-Sigal, state senator of New York
- Sheila Kuehl, first openly gay member of the California legislature; child actress
- Patrick D. McGee (1916–70), California State Assembly and Los Angeles City Council member in the mid–20th century
- Jonathan Miller, state treasurer of Kentucky, Democratic candidate for governor of Kentucky, 2007
- James M. Ogden, Indiana attorney general
- Steve Pajcic, state representative of Florida, Democratic candidate for governor of Florida, 1986
- Alvin C. Reis, state senator and assemblyman of Wisconsin
- Charles Rogan (1858–1932), 15th Texas lands commissioner
- Ilana Rubel, state representative of Idaho
- Lycurgus J. Rusk, state assemblyman of Wisconsin
- Eric Schneiderman, New York attorney general
- Scott Wiener, state senator of California

===== State judges =====
- John F. Aiso (LL.B. 1934), associate justice of the California Court of Appeal; first Japanese-American judge in the US
- John O. Bailey, chief justice of the Oregon Supreme Court, state senator and representative in Oregon
- Norman L. Bassett, associate justice of the Maine Supreme Court
- Samuel H. Blackmer (LL.B., 1927), associate justice of the Vermont Supreme Court
- Amos Noyes Blandin Jr. (LL.B., 1921), justice of the New Hampshire Supreme Court
- James T. Brand, chief justice of the Oregon Supreme Court
- Bruce Bromley, associate judge of the New York Court of Appeals, partner at Cravath, Swaine & Moore
- Kimberly S. Budd, chief justice of the Supreme Judicial Court of Massachusetts; first African-American woman in the role
- Raoul G. Cantero III, associate justice of the Florida Supreme Court
- Chester C. Cole, chief justice of the Iowa Supreme Court, founder of the University of Iowa College of Law, founder of Drake University Law School
- Federico Hernández Denton, chief justice of the Puerto Rico Supreme Court
- Jennifer Walker Elrod (J.D. 1992), Texas state district judge
- James Emmert (1923), justice of the Indiana Supreme Court and Indiana attorney general
- Patrick F. Fischer, justice of the Supreme Court of Ohio
- Paul C. Gartzke, presiding judge of the Wisconsin Court of Appeals
- Ernest W. Gibson III (LL.B. 1956), associate justice of the Vermont Supreme Court
- W. Michael Gillette, Oregon Supreme Court justice
- Benjamin N. Hulburd (LL.B. 1928), chief justice of the Vermont Supreme Court
- Masaji Marumoto (1906–1995), associate justice of the Hawaii Supreme Court
- Sherman R. Moulton, chief justice of the Vermont Supreme Court
- Mary Mullarkey, chief justice of the Colorado Supreme Court
- John S. Murdock (1899), justice of the Rhode Island Supreme Court 1929–1935
- Stuart Rabner, chief justice of the New Jersey Supreme Court
- Gerald Schroeder, chief justice of the Idaho Supreme Court
- Nathaniel Tompkins, associate justice of the Maine Supreme Judicial Court

==== City government ====
- Isaac Adler, mayor of Rochester, New York
- Alvin Bragg (J.D. 1995), New York County district attorney (2022–present)
- David Chiu (J.D.), city attorney of San Francisco
- Robert A. Dressler (J.D. 1973), mayor of Fort Lauderdale, Florida (1982–1986)
- Jorge Elorza (J.D.), mayor of Providence, Rhode Island (2015–present)
- Mike Feuer (J.D.), Los Angeles city attorney (2013–2022)
- Karen Freeman-Wilson, mayor of Gary, Indiana (2012–2019)
- James Marshall Head, mayor of Nashville, Tennessee (1900–1904)
- Samuel A.A. Levine, commissioner of the New York City Department of Consumer and Worker Protection (2026-present)
- Sam Liccardo (J.D. 1996), mayor of San Jose, California (2015–present)
- Ruthzee Louijeune (born 1987) (J.D. 2014), president of the Boston City Council
- Randal William McGavock, mayor of Nashville, Tennessee (1858–1859) and Confederate lt. col.
- Neville Miller (LL.B. 1920), mayor of Louisville, Kentucky (1933–1937)
- Adrian Perkins, mayor of Shreveport, Louisiana (2018–present)
- Joel Wachs, Los Angeles City Council member (1970–2001), president of the Andy Warhol Foundation for the Visual Arts
- Anthony A. Williams (J.D.), mayor of Washington, D.C. (1999–2007)
- Michelle Wu, mayor of Boston

==== U.S. diplomatic figures ====
- Norman Armour, career diplomat, chief of mission in eight countries, assistant secretary of state
- Richard L. Baltimore, U.S. ambassador to Oman (2002–2006)
- Joseph Hodges Choate, U.S. ambassador to the United Kingdom (1848–1852)
- Norman L. Eisen (J.D. 1991), U.S. ambassador to the Czech Republic
- Nicholas Fish II, held various diplomatic posts across Europe
- Charles W. Freeman Jr., U.S. ambassador to Saudi Arabia (1989–1992)
- Evan G. Galbraith, U.S. ambassador to France (1981–1985)
- Rita Hauser, U.S. ambassador to the United Nations Commission on Human Rights (1969–1972)
- Philip Lader, U.S. ambassador to the United Kingdom, White House deputy chief of staff, administrator of the Small Business Administration
- Robert Todd Lincoln, U.S. ambassador to the United Kingdom, United States secretary of war
- Jamie Metzl (J.D.), holder of various diplomatic and human rights positions
- Crystal Nix-Hines, attorney; television writer and producer; U.S. permanent representative to the United Nations
- William Phillips, twice an undersecretary in the State Department
- Samantha Power, U.S. ambassador to the United Nations
- Andrew H. Schapiro, former U.S. ambassador to the Czech Republic; partner of Quinn Emanuel Urquhart & Sullivan
- Todd Stern, special envoy for Climate Change
- Sheldon Vance, U.S. ambassador to the Democratic Republic of the Congo and Chad
- Robert Zoellick, deputy secretary of state, U.S. trade representative, president of the World Bank

==== Other U.S. political figures ====
- Paul V. Applegarth, first CEO of the Millennium Challenge Corporation
- John B. Bellinger III, legal adviser of the Department of State
- Richard C. Breeden, chairman of the Securities and Exchange Commission
- Charles Burson, chief of staff to Vice President Al Gore and Tennessee attorney general
- Pedro Albizu Campos, leader of the Puerto Rico independence movement and the Puerto Rican Nationalist Party
- Calvin G. Child (1858), United States attorney for the District of Connecticut, city judge in Norwich, Connecticut
- Lawrence Clayton (LL.B. 1916), Federal Reserve Board of Governors (1934–1949)
- Paul Clement, solicitor general of the United States
- Archibald Cox, solicitor general of the United States and special prosecutor during the Watergate scandal
- Raj Date, special advisor for the Consumer Financial Protection Bureau (2011–2012)
- A. J. Delgado, senior advisor to the 2016 Donald Trump presidential campaign and member of the Trump transition team
- Viet D. Dinh, assistant attorney general of the United States
- Glenn A. Fine (J.D. 1985), inspector general of the Justice Department (2000–present)
- Patrick Fitzgerald, U.S. attorney for the Northern District of Illinois, prosecutor of many notable corruption trials
- David Frum, author and speechwriter for President George W. Bush
- Ray Garrett Jr., chairman of the Securities and Exchange Commission
- Julius Genachowski, chairman of the Federal Communications Commission
- David Gergen, political consultant and presidential advisor
- David Ginsburg, presidential advisor and executive director of the Kerner Commission
- Josh Gottheimer, speechwriter for Bill Clinton, strategist, candidate for the United States House of Representatives
- Erwin Griswold, solicitor general of the United States and dean of Harvard Law School
- Conrad K. Harper, legal adviser of the Department of State and president of the New York City Bar Association
- Denison Kitchel (LL.B. 1933), national campaign manager for Barry M. Goldwater in 1964
- Saritha Komatireddy (2009), federal prosecutor and former chief of staff of the Drug Enforcement Administration, Republican nominee for attorney general of New York in the 2026 election.
- Jerome Kurtz (1955), commissioner of the Internal Revenue Service (1977–1980)
- Michael Leiter, director of the National Counterterrorism Center
- David Lilienthal, head of the Tennessee Valley Authority
- Karen L. Loeffler, United States attorney for the District of Alaska
- Ronald Machen, United States attorney for the District of Columbia
- Kent Markus, advisor to Ohio Gov. Ted Strickland and former nominee to the U.S. Court of Appeals for the Sixth Circuit
- Kevin J. Martin, chairman of the Federal Communications Commission
- Fernando Martín García, Puerto Rican politician and former member of the Senate of Puerto Rico
- Timothy Massad, chairman of the Commodity Futures Trading Commission
- John J. McCloy, assistant secretary of war, administered U.S. occupation of Germany, president of the World Bank
- Wade H. McCree, solicitor general of the United States
- Joseph A. McNamara, U.S. attorney for Vermont
- Ken Mehlman, chairman of the Republican National Committee; campaign manager for George W. Bush's second presidential run
- Ralph Nader, Green Party presidential candidate (1996, 2000, 2004); consumer advocate
- Michelle Obama, First Lady of the United States
- Matthew G. Olsen, director of the National Counterterrorism Center
- David Peyman, deputy assistant secretary of state for Counter Threat Finance and Sanctions (2018–)
- Loulan Pitre Jr., New Orleans lawyer and former member of the Louisiana House of Representatives for Lafourche Parish, Louisiana
- Franklin Raines, director of the United States Office of Management and Budget
- Edith Ramirez, chairwoman of the Federal Trade Commission
- Angela R. Riley, chief justice of Citizen Potawatomi Nation (2010–present)
- Joseph Sandler, longest-serving general counsel of the Democratic National Committee (1993–2009)
- Hagan Scotten, former assistant U.S. attorney for the Southern District of New York
- Bob Shrum, political consultant
- William Howard Taft IV, legal adviser of the Department of State
- Elisse B. Walter, chairperson of the Securities and Exchange Commission
- Harold M. Williams, chairman of the Securities and Exchange Commission and first president of the J. Paul Getty Trust
- Lee S. Wolosky, former White House counterterrorism official
- Juan Zarate, deputy National Security advisor

=== Non-United States government ===
==== Non-United States political figures ====
===== Canada =====
- Michael Bryant (LL.M., magna cum laude, 1994), attorney general of Ontario
- Loring Christie, envoy extraordinary and minister plenipotentiary to the United States (1939–1941)
- Francis Fox, Canadian cabinet minister and principal secretary
- Joseph Ghiz, premier of Prince Edward Island, Canada
- Robert Stanfield, premier of Nova Scotia, Canada
- Nigel S. Wright, chief of staff of the Office of the Prime Minister

===== India =====
- Dhananjaya Yeshwant Chandrachud (LL.M 1983), 50th and former chief justice of India, 2022–2024
- Rohinton Fali Nariman (LL.M 1981), senior counsel, solicitor general of India, former judge on the Supreme Court of India
- Shankar Dayal Sharma, former president of India
- Kapil Sibal (LLM, 1977), held various ministerial posts (2004–2014), member of Parliament (Rajya Sabha for Uttar Pradesh 2016–present); former additional solicitor general of India (1989–1990); three-time president of the Supreme Court Bar Association (1995–96, 1997–98 and 2001–2002)
- Abhishek Singhvi, lawyer, politician, youngest person to be appointed senior counsel, additional solicitor general of India and vice president of the Supreme Court Bar Association
- Laxmi Mall Singhvi (LL.M), jurist, parliamentariam, scholar and diplomat

===== Japan =====
- Count Kaneko Kentarō (LL.B.), Meiji oligarch politician, genrō, drafter of the Meiji Constitution
- Marquess Komura Jutarō (LL.B.), Meiji oligarch politician, senior diplomat, foreign minister
- Kōno Shunji (LL.M.), governor of Miyazaki Prefecture

===== Taiwan =====
- Annette Lu (LL.M.), former vice president of the Republic of China
- Ma Ying-jeou (S.J.D.), president of the Republic of China, chairman of the Kuomintang, former mayor of Taipei
- Eric Wu (LL.M., S.J.D.), businessman

===== United Kingdom =====
- Greville Janner, Baron Janner of Braunstone, British Labour Party politician
- David Lammy (LLM), UK Minister of State for Higher Education, former minister of Culture, MP for Tottenham
- Anthony Lester, Baron Lester of Herne Hill, Liberal Democrat member of the British House of Lords

===== Other countries =====
- Sonny Angara (LL.M.), senator, Senate of the Philippines
- Duma Gideon Boko, 6th president of Botswana
- Ben Bot, former minister of Foreign Affairs of the Netherlands
- Roberto Dañino (LL.M.), prime minister of Peru (2001–2002) and ambassador of Peru to the United States (2002–2003)
- Juan Ponce Enrile (LL.M.), senator in the Senate of the Philippines
- Luc Frieden, incumbent prime minister of Luxembourg
- Daniel Friedmann, Israeli minister of Justice
- José García-Margallo, former minister of Foreign Affairs and Cooperation of Spain
- Lindsay Grant, former leader of the People's Action Movement of Saint Kitts and Nevis
- Lim Gwang-hyeon, Chief of Staff to the President of South Korea
- Ho Peng Kee (LL.M. 1981), former member of Parliament and senior minister of state in the Ministry of Law and the Ministry of Home Affairs in Singapore
- Khalid Jawed Khan, attorney general of Pakistan
- Daniel Lipšic, interior minister of Slovakia, former minister of Justice
- Fientje Moerman, Belgian, and later Flemish, minister of Economy, Enterprises, Innovation, Science and Foreign Trade
- Kiraitu Murungi, Kenyan minister of Justice and Constitutional Affairs and Energy
- Luis María Ramírez Boettner, former minister of Foreign Affairs of Paraguay
- Mary Robinson, former president of the Republic of Ireland and UN high commissioner for Human Rights
- Nawaf Salam, Lebanon's permanent representative to the United Nations
- Jovito Salonga (LL.M.), Philippine senator
- Lobsang Sangay, Sikyong Tibetan Government in Exile
- Surakiart Sathirathai, deputy prime minister of Thailand
- Gilbert Teodoro (LL.M.), incumbent secretary of the Department of National Defense of the Philippines and former congressman
- Ahmed Zaki Yamani, Saudi Arabian oil minister and OPEC official

==== Non-United States judicial figures ====
===== International court judges =====
- Georges Abi-Saab, Egyptian jurist who served on the Appeals Chamber of the International Criminal Tribunal for Yugoslavia and International Criminal Tribunal for Rwanda, as chairman of the Appellate Body of the World Trade Organization, and as judge ad hoc at the International Court of Justice
- Richard Reeve Baxter, U.S. judge appointed to the International Court of Justice
- Charles N. Brower, U.S. judge appointed to the Iran-US Claims Tribunal
- Thomas Buergenthal, U.S. judge appointed to the International Court of Justice and the Inter-American Court of Human Rights
- Sir Robert Yewdall Jennings, British judge appointed to the International Court of Justice
- Kenneth Keith, New Zealand judge appointed to the International Court of Justice
- O-Gon Kwon, South Korean judge who served as vice president of the International Criminal Tribunal for the former Yugoslavia
- Koen Lenaerts (LL.M. 78), Belgian judge at the European Court of Justice
- Theodor Meron, U.S. jurist, president of the International Residual Mechanism for Criminal Tribunals, former president of the International Criminal Tribunal for the former Yugoslavia
- Raul Pangalangan, Filipino lawyer appointed to the International Criminal Court
- Navi Pillay, South African judge appointed to the International Criminal Court and the International Criminal Tribunal for Rwanda
- Nawaf Salam, Lebanese judge appointed to the International Court of Justice
- Sang-Hyun Song, South Korean lawyer who served as president and judge of the Appeals Chamber of the International Criminal Court
- Solomon Areda Waktolla (LL.M 14 and MPA 13), judge of United Nations Dispute Tribunal; judge of the Administrative Tribunal of the African Development Bank; member of the permanent Court of Arbitration at Hague Netherlands; former deputy chief justice of Ethiopia

===== United Kingdom =====
- Mary Arden, Lady Arden of Heswall, former justice of the Supreme Court of the United Kingdom
- Nicholas Hamblen, Lord Hamblen of Kersey, current justice of the Supreme Court of the United Kingdom

====== Hong Kong ======
- Andrew Cheung Kui-nung (LLM 1985), permanent judge of the Court of Final Appeal of Hong Kong (2018–); former chief judge of the High Court of Hong Kong and president of the Court of Appeal of Hong Kong (2011–2018)

==== Pakistan ====
- Nasira Iqbal (LLM), chief justice of High Court Lahore, daughter-in-law of Allama Iqbal

===== India =====
- Dhananjaya Y. Chandrachud, 50th chief justice of India
- Rohinton Fali Nariman (LLM), judge, Supreme Court of India; former solicitor general of India; youngest senior advocate designated by the Supreme Court of India in the history of Republic of India

===== Other countries =====
- Renato Corona (LL.M.), former chief justice of the Supreme Court of the Philippines
- Albert Francis Judd (LL.B. 1864, LL.D. 1894), chief justice, Kingdom of Hawaii Supreme Court
- Lai In-jaw (S.J.D.), former president of the Judicial Yuan (chief justice of the Constitutional Court) of the Republic of China
- Bora Laskin (LL.M. 1939), puisne justice of the Supreme Court of Canada (1970–1973), chief justice of Canada (1973–1984)
- Gertrude Lübbe-Wolff (LL.M.), Second Senate, Federal Constitutional Court of Germany
- Sundaresh Menon (LL.M. 1991), chief justice of Singapore
- Sandile Ngcobo (LL.M.), chief justice of South Africa
- Masaharu Ōhashi (LL.M. 1976), justice of the Supreme Court of Japan
- Andrew Phang (LL.M. 1984, S.J.D. 1987), judge of appeal, Supreme Court of Singapore
- Ivan Rand (LL.B. 1912), puisne justice of the Supreme Court of Canada (1943–1959)
- Bernard Rix (LL.M. 1969), lord justice, English Court of Appeals
- Vicente Abad Santos (LL.M.), associate justice of the Supreme Court of the Philippines
- Wishart Spence (LL.M. 1929), puisne justice of the Supreme Court of Canada
- Freda Steel (1978), Manitoba Court of Appeal judge
- Solomon Areda Waktolla (LL.M'14 and MPA'13), judge at United Nations Dispute Tribunal, judge of the Administrative Tribunal of the African Development Bank, former deputy chief justice of the Federal Supreme Court of Ethiopia, member of the Permanent Court of Arbitration at Hague Netherlands

=== International organizations figures ===
- Radhika Coomaraswamy, under-secretary-general of the United Nations, special representative for Children and Armed Conflict
- Gerald L. Neuman, United Nations Human Rights Committee
- Navanethem Pillay (LLM 1982, SJD 1988), UN high commissioner for Human Rights
- Mary Robinson, former UN high commissioner for Human Rights
- Eduardo Valencia Ospina (LL.M. 1963), chair of the UN International Law Commission, former registrar of the International Court of Justice
- Robert Zoellick, president of the World Bank Group

== Private legal practice ==
- Daniel J. Arbess (LL.M.), partner at White & Case
- Michael F. Armstrong, attorney
- Rayhan Asat (LL.M. 2016), attorney and human rights advocate
- Joaquin Avila, voting rights advocate
- Bennett Boskey (LL.B. 1939), law clerk to Judge Learned Hand and two U.S. Supreme Court justices
- Edward B. Burling (LL.B.), lawyer, founding partner of Covington & Burling
- Edmund N. Carpenter II (LL.B. 1948), former president of Richards, Layton & Finger; past president of the Delaware State Bar Association and American Judicature Society
- Morgan Chu (J.D. 1976), intellectual property lawyer and co-managing partner at Irell & Manella
- Grenville Clark (LL.B., 1909), Wall Street lawyer and co-founder of Dewey Ballantine LLP
- H. Rodgin Cohen, corporate lawyer noted for representation of large financial institutions during the 2008 financial crisis
- Susan Estrich, attorney; author; political commentator; first female president of Harvard Law Review; first female presidential campaign manager (Dukakis)
- Bert Fields (LL.B., 1952), entertainment lawyer, clients included The Beatles, James Cameron, Tom Cruise, and Michael Jackson
- Joseph H. Flom, name partner at Skadden, Arps, Slate, Meagher & Flom
- Haben Girma, disability rights advocate, first deafblind graduate of Harvard Law School
- Menaka Guruswamy (LL.M., 2001), senior counsel at the Supreme Court of India, visiting faculty at various universities
- Khizr Khan, legal consultant
- Christopher Landau, partner of Quinn Emanuel Urquhart & Sullivan
- Dana Latham (LL.B.), co-founder of Latham & Watkins, commissioner of Internal Revenue (1958–1961)
- Francis Draper Lewis, co-founder of Morgan, Lewis & Bockius
- Zia Mody (LL.M., 1979), Indian corporate lawyer and co-founder of AZB & Partners
- John B. Quinn, founder and name partner of Quinn Emanuel Urquhart & Sullivan
- Louis L. Redding, first Black lawyer in Delaware, successfully litigated Gebhart v. Belton, which was upheld in Brown v. Board of Education
- Reginald H. Smith, lawyer, an early partner of WilmerHale
- Alex Spiro, former assistant district attorney for Manhattan; partner of Quinn Emanuel Urquhart & Sullivan
- Kathleen Sullivan, former dean of Stanford Law School; name partner of Quinn Emanuel Urquhart & Sullivan
- Bethuel M. Webster, founder of Webster & Sheffield
- George W. Wightman, sports official, an early partner of WilmerHale
- Frederick H. Winston, a founder of Winston & Strawn; U.S. minister to Iran

== Academia ==
=== University and college chancellors and presidents ===
- Jonathan R. Alger, James Madison University
- Lawrence S. Bacow, Tufts University
- Derek Bok, twice Harvard University
- Kingman Brewster Jr., Yale University and U.S. ambassador to the United Kingdom
- Thomas V. Chema, Hiram College
- Colin Diver, Reed College
- Thomas Ehrlich, Indiana University
- Bruce Walker Ferguson, American University of Iraq, Sulaimani
- Ken Gormley, Duquesne University
- Danielle Holley, Mount Holyoke College
- Garry Jenkins, Bates College
- Beong-Soo Kim, University of Southern California
- David Leebron, Rice University
- William C. Powers, University of Texas
- Jennifer Raab, Hunter College, City University of New York
- Laura Rosenbury, Barnard College
- Father Michael Scanlan, Franciscan University of Steubenville
- Joel Seligman, University of Rochester
- John Sexton, New York University
- Ethan A.H. Shepley, Washington University in St. Louis
- Adel Tamano (LL.M.), University of the City of Manila of the Philippines; dean of Law of Liceo de Cagayan University
- Michael K. Young, University of Washington

=== Legal academia ===
==== Law school deans ====
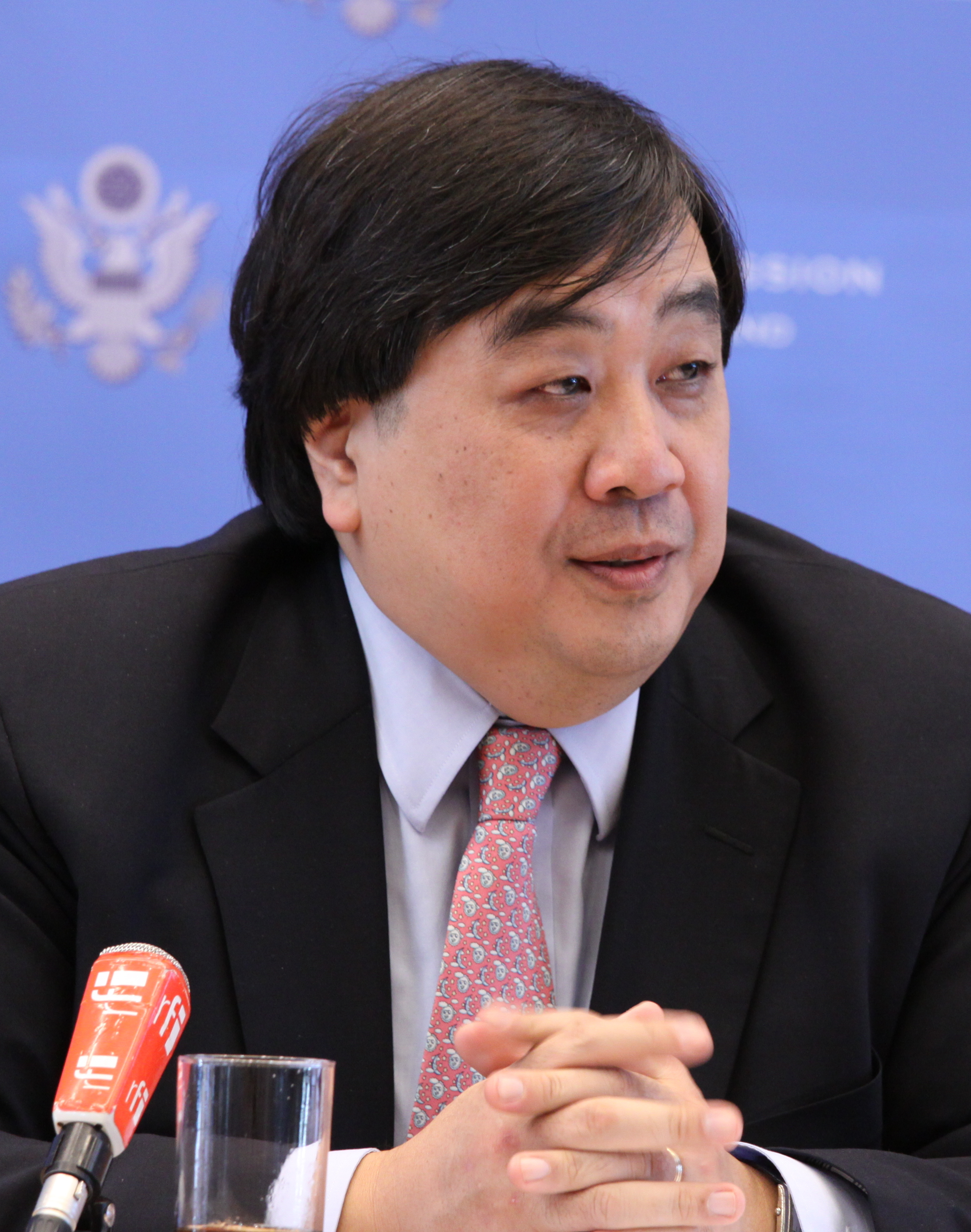
Harold Hongju Koh

- Andres Bautista (LL.M. 1993), law faculty dean at Far Eastern University in the Philippines
- Mary Anne Bobinski (LL.M. 1989), dean of the Allard School of Law at the University of British Columbia, 2003–2015
- Tom Campbell (J.D. 1976), dean of the Chapman University School of Law
- Erwin Chemerinsky (J.D. 1978), founding dean of University of California, Irvine School of Law; former constitutional law scholar at Duke Law School
- Jim Chen, dean of University of Louisville School of Law
- Robert C. Clark (J.D. 1972), dean (1989–2003) and professor at Harvard Law
- Clarence Clyde Ferguson Jr. (LL.B. 1951), dean and professor at Harvard Law, diplomat and U.S. ambassador to Uganda
- Peter Hogg (LL.M. 1963), dean of Osgoode Hall Law School of Toronto, constitutional scholar
- Charles Hamilton Houston, dean of Howard University School of Law and NAACP litigation director
- Bruce Jacob (S.J.D.), alumnus, professor, and dean of Stetson University College of Law, dean of Mercer University Law School
- Kevin Johnson, dean of the UC Davis School of Law (King Hall)
- Elena Kagan (J.D. 1986), dean of Harvard Law (2003–2009)
- Joseph D. Kearney (J.D. 1989), dean of the Marquette University Law School
- Edwin R. Keedy (LL.B. 1906), dean of the University of Pennsylvania Law School
- W. Page Keeton, dean of the University of Texas School of Law
- Harold Hongju Koh (J.D. 1980), dean of Yale Law School and assistant secretary of state
- Tommy Koh (LL.M. 1964), former dean of National University of Singapore Faculty of Law, ambassador-at-large for the Government of Singapore
- Charles T. McCormick, dean of the University of Texas Law School and the University of North Carolina School of Law
- Robert Mundheim (LLB 1957), dean of the University of Pennsylvania Law School
- Makau W. Mutua (LL.M. 1985, S.J.D. 1987), dean of University at Buffalo Law School, State University of New York
- William L. Prosser, dean of the Boalt Hall School of Law at UC Berkeley
- Symeon C. Symeonides (LL.M. 1974, S.J.D. 1980), dean of the Willamette University College of Law
- Cesar L. Villanueva (LL.M. 1989), dean of the Ateneo de Manila Law School in the Philippines
- Goh Yihan (LL.M. 2010), dean of the SMU School of Law at the Singapore Management University

==== Conflict of laws ====
- Joseph Henry Beale, professor of conflict of laws, corporations, and criminal law at Harvard Law School (acting dean, 1929–1930) and University of Chicago Law School (1st dean, 1902–1904)

==== Constitutional law ====
- Jack Balkin, studies constitutional law and the impact of technology on law
- Robert Delahunty (J.D. 1983), professor of constitutional law at the University of St. Thomas School of Law
- Michael C. Dorf, professor of constitutional law at Columbia Law School
- Patrick J. Monahan, senior policy analyst to Ontario AG Ian Scott during Canadian Meech Lake Accord
- John Ordronaux, Civil War army surgeon, professor of medical jurisprudence at Columbia Law School, pioneering mental health commissioner
- Richard Pildes, professor of constitutional law and public law at NYU School of Law
- Nadine Strossen, professor of constitutional law and scholar of civil liberties at New York Law School, former president of the ACLU
- Kathleen Sullivan, constitutional law scholar at Stanford Law School
- Arthur E. Sutherland Jr. (J.D. 1925), professor of constitutional and commercial law at Harvard Law School; clerked with Justice Oliver Wendell Holmes Jr.; took two cases before the US Supreme Court, one on price fixing in New York, and one on the Massachusetts Blue Laws; author and editor of numerous law texts
- Laurence Tribe (J.D. 1966), professor of constitutional law at Harvard Law School
- Paul C. Weiler, Henry J. Friendly Professor of Law, Emeritus, Harvard Law School; influenced the Canadian 1982 Constitution

==== Criminal law ====
- Robert Blecker, criminal law professor at New York Law School and national expert on and advocate for the death penalty
- Bernard Harcourt (J.D. 1989), criminological critical theorist
- Dan Markel, law professor at Florida State University College of Law specializing in penology
- Stephen Schulhofer (born 1942), professor of Law at the University of Pennsylvania Law School and NYU Law School

==== Legal history ====
- Richard B. Bernstein (J.D. 1980), constitutional historian at New York Law School
- Richard H. Helmholz (LL.B. 1965), property, natural resource, and legal history scholar at the University of Chicago Law School
- Bernard Hibbitts (LL.M. 1988), legal history and technology of law scholar at the University of Pittsburgh School of Law
- Morton Horwitz (LL.B. 1967), torts and legal history scholar
- John H. Langbein (LL.B. 1968), Sterling Professor of Law and Legal History at Yale Law School
- Daniel H. Lowenstein (LLB 1967), election law at UCLA Law School
- Charles Warren, Pulitzer Prize–winning legal historian and assistant attorney general

==== International law ====
- Payam Akhavan (LL.M. 1990, S.J.D. 2001), United Nations special rapporteur, visiting fellow at Oxford University, Member of Permanent Court of Arbitration at the Hague
- Francis Boyle, international law professor at the University of Illinois
- Amy Chua (J.D. 1987), international law and economics scholar at Yale Law School
- Louis Henkin (LL.B 1940), international law and human rights authority
- David Kennedy, critical theorist of international law
- Joe Oloka-Onyango (LL.M., S.J.D.), Ugandan legal academic at Makerere University
- Eric Posner, international law scholar at the University of Chicago Law School
- Brad R. Roth, professor of international law and political science at Wayne State University
- Rangita de Silva de Alwis (LL.M., S.J.D.), adjunct professor of global leadership at the University of Pennsylvania
- Simon Tay, associate professor at the National University of Singapore Faculty of Law
- Edith Brown Weiss, professor of law at Georgetown University and former president of the American Society of International Law

==== Law and literature ====
- Jane C. Ginsburg, art and literary law property professor at Columbia Law
- Dan Fenno Henderson (1949), founder of the University of Washington Asian law program; author of several works related to Japanese law
- James Boyd White (1964), founder of the law and literature movement

==== Legal philosophy ====
- Randy Barnett, libertarian legal theorist
- Ronald Dworkin, legal and political philosopher
- Wesley Newcomb Hohfeld (LL.B. 1904), professor at Stanford and Yale Law Schools, progenitor of the concepts of claim rights and liberty rights and the bundle of rights
- Richard Posner (LL.B. 1962), professor at the University of Chicago Law School, started the law and economics movement, judge on the United States Court of Appeals for the Seventh Circuit
- Rob Saltzman (JD, 1979), emeritus professor of Lawyering Skills at the University of Southern California (USC) Gould School of Law
- Peter Tillers, professor at Cardozo Law School and theorist of the law of evidence

==== Law and technology ====
- Jack Balkin, studies constitutional law and the impact of technology on law
- William W. Fisher, intellectual property law professor at Harvard Law School and director of the Berkman Center for Internet and Society
- Peter Junger (LL.B. 1958), Internet law activist and professor at Case Western Reserve University
- Charles Nesson, professor at Harvard Law School and founder of the Berkman Center for Internet & Society
- Michael Rustad, intellectual property scholar, author, and professor at Suffolk University Law School
- Tim Wu (J.D. 1998), professor of law and technology at Columbia; coined the term "net neutrality"; writer for Slate
- Jonathan Zittrain (J.D. 1995), professor of Internet Law at Harvard Law School and Harvard Kennedy School

==== Other legal academia ====
- Alberto Alemanno, legal scholar at New York University
- Stephen Barnett (1935–2009), legal scholar at Berkeley Law who opposed the Newspaper Preservation Act of 1970
- George Bisharat, expert on Middle East legal and political affairs
- Andrew Burrows (LL.M. 1981), professor of the Law of England at the University of Oxford, senior research fellow at All Souls College
- Hugh Collins (LL.M. 1976), Vinerian Professor of English Law at the University of Oxford, fellow of All Souls College
- Kimberlé Crenshaw, professor at Columbia Law School and UCLA Law School and Centennial Professor at the London School of Economics; critical race scholar, civil rights advocate, introduced and developed intersectional theory
- Susan Estrich, feminist and legal commentator for Fox News
- Owen M. Fiss, Sterling Professor at Yale Law School
- Robert P. George, professor of jurisprudence at Princeton University
- Martin D. Ginsburg (J.D. 1958), taxation law expert; professor of law at Georgetown University Law Center; husband of U.S. Supreme Court Justice Ruth Bader Ginsburg
- Annette Gordon-Reed (J.D. 1984), professor at Harvard Law School and Pulitzer Prize for History winner
- Robert A. Gorman (LL.B. 1962), law professor at the University of Pennsylvania Law School
- John Chipman Gray (LL.B. 1861), property law professor and founder of the law firm Ropes & Gray
- Livingston Hall, Roscoe Pound Professor of Law at Harvard Law School until his 1971 retirement
- George Haskins (1942), Algernon Sydney Biddle Professor of Law at the University of Pennsylvania Law School
- John Honnold (1939), William A. Schnader Professor of Commercial Law at the University of Pennsylvania Law School
- William A. Jacobson, Cornell Law School professor and blogger
- Christine M. Jolls, professor of law and economics at Yale Law School
- Jerry Kang, professor at the UCLA School of Law and UCLA's first vice chancellor for equality, diversity and inclusion
- Alexandra Lahav, lawyer and Anthony W. and Lulu C. Wang Professor of Law at Cornell Law School
- Thio Li-ann (LL.M. 1993), professor at the National University of Singapore Faculty of Law
- Lance Liebman, professor at Columbia Law School and director of the American Law Institute
- John F. Manning, Bruce Bromley Professor at Harvard Law School
- Mari Matsuda, professor at Georgetown University Law Center, a leading voice in critical race theory, and first tenured female Asian-American law professor in the U.S.
- Arthur R. Miller, professor at NYU School of Law, former professor at Harvard Law School
- Paul Steven Miller, disability rights expert, EEOC commissioner, professor at the University of Washington School of Law, special assistant to the president
- Charles ("Chuck") W. Mooney Jr., Charles A. Heimbold Jr. Professor of Law, and former interim dean, at the University of Pennsylvania Law School
- Herbert B. Newberg, class action attorney
- John V. Orth (J.D. 1974), professor of law at UNC-Chapel Hill
- John Palfrey, executive director of the Berkman Center for Internet and Society and Harvard clinical professor of law
- Reed Shuldiner (J.D. 1983), Alvin L. Snowiss Professor of Law at the University of Pennsylvania Law School
- Lawrence Solan (J.D. 1982), professor of law at Brooklyn Law School
- Cass Sunstein (J.D. 1978), professor at Harvard Law School
- Steve Thel (J.D. 1979), professor at Fordham University School of Law
- Amy Wax (first year of law school, 1981), Robert Mundheim Professor of Law at the University of Pennsylvania Law School
- Patricia J. Williams (J.D. 1975), proponent of critical race theory in law

=== Other academia ===
- Edward N. Beiser (1977), political scientist
- Wallace Clift (J.D. 1952), psychology and religion, author of books including Jung and Christianity: The Challenge of Reconciliationde
- Herbert J. Davenport, economist
- John Fiske, philosopher and historian
- Harvey J. Levin (fellow in Law and Economics, 1963–64), communications economist
- John Matteson (J.D. 1986), English professor and Pulitzer Prize–winning literary biographer
- Cheryl Mendelson, ethics philosopher and novelist
- Samuel Moyn (J.D. 2001), intellectual historian
- Eli Noam (J.D. 1975), professor of finance and economics at Columbia Business School
- David Riesman, sociologist; author of The Lonely Crowd
- Anne-Marie Slaughter, dean of the Woodrow Wilson School of Public and International Affairs at Princeton University
- Robert Somol, director of the University of Illinois at Chicago architecture school

== Activism ==
- George Thorndike Angell, anti-animal cruelty activist
- Richard Barnet (J.D. 1954), disarmament activist and co-founder of the leftist think tank Institute for Policy Studies
- Larissa Behrendt (LL.M. 1994, S.J.D., 1998), Australian aboriginal rights activist, novelist, filmmaker
- Janet Benshoof, human rights lawyer, founder of the Center for Reproductive Rights and the Global Justice Center
- Luke Cole, environmental lawyer and co-founder of the Center on Race, Poverty & the Environment
- John P. Davis (LL.B. 1933), African-American activist
- Alfred-Maurice de Zayas, human rights advocate and historian
- George Esser, civil rights advocate
- Sandra Froman, attorney and past president of the National Rifle Association of America
- Jennifer Gordon, immigrant labor organizer
- Jodi Grant, executive director of the Afterschool Alliance
- Mark Green, public interest author, candidate for senator from New York (1986), mayor of New York City (2001) and New York State attorney general (2006)
- Archibald Grimké, co-founder of the NAACP
- Marjorie Heins, free speech and civil liberties advocate
- Mary Howell (J.D. 1991), fought to open medical schools to women
- Muhammad Kenyatta, civil rights leader and professor
- Irene Khan, secretary general of Amnesty International
- Brink Lindsey, Cato Institute libertarian activist
- Hans F. Loeser (J.D. 1950), anti-Vietnam War activist
- John Maktos, revised punishments for genocide
- David A. Morse, winner of the Nobel Peace Prize for leadership of the International Labour Organization
- Ethan Nadelmann, anti-war on drugs activist
- Ralph Nader, consumer advocate and frequent Green Party presidential candidate
- Basil O'Connor, polio research advocate and president of the American Red Cross
- Rebecca Onie, CEO of Health Leads and MacArthur Fellowship recipient
- Wendell Phillips (1934), abolitionist and Native American rights advocate
- Louis L. Redding (LL.B. 1928), NAACP lawyer and civil rights advocate; first African-American admitted to the Delaware bar
- Randall Robinson, anti-apartheid and pro-Haitian immigrant activist; founded the TransAfrica Forum
- Harry Rothenberg, civil rights/injury attorney, son of Allen Rothenberg, head of COLPA
- Harvey A. Silverglate, founder of the Foundation for Individual Rights in Education
- Silda Wall Spitzer, founder of Children for Children, former First Lady of New York State
- Bryan Stevenson, founder and executive director of the Equal Justice Initiative, and author of Just Mercy
- Moorfield Storey, president of the NAACP and the Anti-Imperialist League
- Nadine Strossen, president of the American Civil Liberties Union
- William English Walling, co-founder of the NAACP and founder of the Women's Trade Union League
- Evan Wolfson, civil rights attorney, founder and president of Freedom to Marry

== Arts ==
=== Acting ===
- Justin Deabler, starred in The Real World: Hawaii (1992)
- Jared Delgin, child actor
- David Dorfman, film and television actor, child prodigy
- Ameer Gilani, television actor
- Hill Harper, film, television, and stage actor
- Samuel S. Hinds, film actor
- Sheila Kuehl, child actress, first openly gay member of the California legislature

=== Architecture ===
- Paul Byard, architect and director of the Columbia architecture school historic preservation program

=== Comedy ===
- Richard Appel, comic writer, The Simpsons and The Cleveland Show
- John Cochran, comedy writer and television personality
- Fred de Cordova, producer of The Tonight Show Starring Johnny Carson
- Greg Giraldo, stand-up comedian and television personality

=== Film ===
- Sidney Salkow, director

=== Literature ===
- Benjamin Vaughan Abbott (LL.B. 1851), novelist and author of the New York State penal code
- Seth Abramson (J.D. 2001), poet
- Jacob M. Appel, short story writer, playwright (Arborophilia, The Mistress of Wholesome, Creve Coeur)
- John Ballem (LL.M. 1950), murder mystery/thriller novelist
- Louis Begley (LL.B. 1959), PEN/Hemingway Award-winning novelist; author of About Schmidt
- Alexander Boldizar (J.D. 1999), writer and critic
- Susan Cain (J.D. 1993), attorney, New York Times bestselling writer (Quiet: The Power of Introverts... and Bittersweet)
- Viola Canales (J.D. 1989), novelist and short story writer
- John Casey, novelist
- Max Ehrmann, poet
- Amy Gutman (J.D. 1993), novelist
- Mohsin Hamid (J.D. 1997), novelist; author of the PEN/Hemingway Award finalist Moth Smoke and the Booker Prize-nominated The Reluctant Fundamentalist
- Jeremiah Healy (1973), crime novelist
- Murad Kalam (J.D. 2002), novelist and short story writer
- Brad Leithauser, poet, novelist, essay
- Ken Liu (J.D. 2004), Hugo Award and Nebula Award–winning novelist, short story writer, and translator
- James Russell Lowell, romantic poet, satirist, literary critic, U.S. ambassador to Spain, and U.S. ambassador to the United Kingdom
- Archibald MacLeish (LL.B. 1919), Pulitzer Prize–winning modernist poet, playwright and Librarian of Congress
- John Matteson (J.D. 1986), Pulitzer Prize–winning biographer
- James Alan McPherson, Pulitzer Prize–winning short story writer and essayist
- Cheryl Mendelson, novelist and philosopher of medical ethics
- John Jay Osborn Jr., author of The Paper Chase
- Wena Poon (J.D. 1998), Singaporean author
- Susan Power, PEN/Hemingway Award-winning novelist
- William Henry Rhodes (LL.B. 1846), poet, essayist, short story writer
- Jack Schlossberg (JD–MBA, 2022), writer
- Akhil Sharma, PEN/Hemingway Award-winning short story writer, novelist
- Pamela Thomas-Graham, author of the Ivy League Mysteries series
- Arthur Train (LL.B. 1899), author of legal thrillers
- Scott Turow (J.D. 1978), author of legal thrillers
- Walter Wager, mystery and spy fiction novelist
- Ayelet Waldman (J.D. 1991), novelist; wrote Mommy-Track Mysteries, Love and Other Impossible Pursuits; former columnist for Slate
- Sabin Willett (J.D. 1983), novelist and defense lawyer for Guantanamo Bay detainment camp inmates
- Lauren Willig, historical romance novelist
- William Winter (LL.B. 1857), author and literary critic
- Owen Wister (LL.B. 1888), writer of westerns, including The Virginian
- Austin Tappan Wright (L.L.B. 1908), writer and legal scholar, wrote Islandia

=== Music ===
- Samim Bilgen (1962), Turkish composer
- Ruben Blades, salsa singer-songwriter; Panamanian minister of tourism
- Jackie Fuchs (J.D., 1991), bassist for the music group The Runaways under her former stage name Jackie Fox
- Bridgit Mendler, singer and actress
- James Cutler Dunn Parker, composer

=== Visual arts ===
- George Hitchcock, painter
- William Wetmore Story, sculptor

== Business ==
- John Jacob Astor III, financier and member of the Astor family
- Lloyd Blankfein, chairman and CEO of Goldman Sachs
- David Bonderman, co-founder of private equity firm TPG Capital
- Doug Carlston, founder of computer game company Brøderbund Software
- Finn M. W. Caspersen (J.D. 1966), financier, philanthropist, CEO of Beneficial Corporation and Knickerbocker Management
- Kenneth Chenault, chairman and CEO of American Express
- Bonnie Chan, CEO of Hong Kong Exchanges and Clearing
- Domenico De Sole, chairman of Tom Ford International and Sotheby's
- Russ DeLeon, founder of online gambling site PartyGaming
- Marc Dreier, sole equity partner in Dreier LLP convicted of securities fraud for selling $700 million in fictitious promissory notes
- James Martin Eder
- Jonathan Greenleaf Eveleth, founder of first U.S. oil company
- Roger W. Ferguson Jr. (J.D. 1979), CEO of TIAA-CREF
- Kenneth Frazier (J.D. 1978), president and CEO of Merck & Co.
- Tully Friedman, founder of Friedman Fleischer & Lowe; chairman of the board of trustees of the American Enterprise Institute
- Annette Gozon-Valdes, senior vice president of GMA Network
- Gerald Grinstein, CEO of Delta Air Lines
- Douglas Hagerman, general counsel, secretary, and senior vice president of Rockwell Automation
- Charles E. Haldeman, CEO of Freddie Mac
- Glenn Hutchins, co-founder of private equity firm Silver Lake Partners
- Mitchell R. Julis, co-founder of hedge fund Canyon Capital Advisors
- Jeff Kindler, CEO of Pfizer
- Reginald Lewis, first African-American financier to create a billion-dollar business
- Kenneth Lipper, investment banker, novelist, film producer
- Alfred Lee Loomis
- Mathew Martoma (born 1974), hedge fund portfolio manager, convicted of insider trading
- Charlie Munger (1924–2023), vice-chairman of Berkshire Hathaway
- L. L. Nunn, entrepreneur and educator
- Adebayo Ogunlesi, chairman of private equity firm Global Infrastructure Partners
- Ellen Pao, interim CEO of Reddit
- Mandy Price, co-founded and CEO of Kanarys
- Abram Nicholas Pritzker, founder of the Hyatt hotel chain and member of the Pritzker family
- Keith Rabois, technology entrepreneur, executive and investor
- Clarence B. Randall, chairman of the Inland Steel Company
- Sumner Redstone, chairman of National Amusements
- Leonid Rozhetskin, financier
- Anthony Scaramucci, founder and co-managing partner of SkyBridge Capital
- Paul Singer, founder and CEO of Elliott Management Corporation and founder of the Paul E. Singer Family Foundation
- Jeff Smisek, chairman, president, and CEO of United Airlines
- Gerald L. Storch, chairman and CEO of Toys "R" Us
- Pamela Thomas-Graham, CEO of CNBC
- Charlemagne Tower, railroad executive
- Jon Vander Ark, president of Republic Services
- Bruce Wasserstein, CEO of Lazard
- William Woodward Sr., banker and thoroughbred horse racer
- Mortimer Zuckerman, editor-in-chief of U.S. News & World Report, owner of the New York Daily News

== Entertainment industry ==
- Paul Attanasio, TV/film screenwriter and producer; worked on House and Homicide: Life on the Street
- Ronald Bass, Academy Award-winning screenwriter and film producer; wrote Rain Man
- Peter Blake, consulting producer for House
- Debra Martin Chase, Hollywood producer
- Clive Davis, Grammy Award-winning music producer
- Fred de Cordova (1933), film and television director and producer
- Ameer Gilani, Pakistani television actor
- Bill Jemas, comic book writer and producer
- Christopher Keyser, TV screenwriter for Party of Five
- Jeff Kwatinetz, music manager and television producer
- Ken Ludwig, playwright and theater director
- Jeffrey Orridge, television executive
- David Otunga, actor; former reality tv contestant; WWE wrestler and commentator; two-time WWE Tag Team Champion; lawyer; former husband of Jennifer Hudson
- Cary Sherman, chairman and CEO of the Recording Industry Association of America
- David Sonenberg, music manager and film producer
- Jon F. Vein, founder and CEO of MarketShare (subsidiary of Neustar); Emmy Award-winning animation producer
- David Zippel, Tony Award-winning musical theater lyricist

== Media and journalism ==
=== Commentators ===
- Keith Boykin, author, commentator; hosts My Two Cents on BET
- Jim Cramer, host of CNBC's Mad Money and co-founder of TheStreet.com
- Debra Dickerson, essayist on race
- Rebecca Eisenberg (J.D. 1993), early blogger and writer on technology
- Susan Estrich, feminist and legal commentator for Fox News
- David Frum, author and speechwriter for President George W. Bush
- Thomas Geoghegan, legal commentator
- Lawrence Otis Graham, writer on contemporary race and class issues
- Norman Hapgood, editor and critic
- George Stillman Hillard, biographer, journalist, and Maine state politician
- John H. Hinderaker, conservative blogger
- Elie Honig (J.D., 2000), assistant U.S. attorney and CNN senior legal analyst
- Mickey Kaus, journalist and blogger for Slate
- Carol Platt Liebau (1992), political analyst and commentator
- Eric Liu, writer on race and mentorship; columnist for Slate
- Ruth Marcus (J.D. 1984), columnist for The Washington Post
- Kevin Philips, political commentator, Richard Nixon campaign strategist
- Samantha Power, Pulitzer Prize–winning writer on genocide, human rights, and foreign policy
- Laurie Puhn, commentator, self-help author, and television hostess
- Dong Puno, Philippine columnist, television host and producer
- Ben Shapiro, host of The Ben Shapiro Show and co-founder of The Daily Wire
- Jeffrey Steingarten, columnist for Vogue and Slate magazines; food critic
- James B. Stewart, Pulitzer Prize–winning journalist
- Jeffrey Toobin, legal analyst for CNN and staff writer for The New Yorker
- Lis Wiehl (1987), legal analyst for Fox News and NPR
- Tim Wu, writer for Slate; coined the term "net neutrality"; professor of law and technology at Columbia

=== Journalists ===
- Ben Bradlee, former editor-at-large of The Washington Post
- Adam Cohen, editorial page editor for The New York Times
- William L. Laurence, Pulitzer Prize–winning science journalist who covered the testing and dropping of the atomic bomb
- Rob Simmelkjaer, anchor/correspondent for ABC News Now
- Gregory White Smith, 1991 Pulitzer Prize–winning author of Jackson Pollock: An American Saga
- James B. Stewart, 1988 Pulitzer Prize winner for explanatory journalism

=== Publishers ===
- Robert C. Bassett, publisher of the Milwaukee Sentinel
- Martin S. Fox (1924–2020), publisher
- Phil Graham, publisher of The Washington Post
- Tim Hays, publisher of the Riverside Press-Enterprise
- Boisfeuillet Jones Jr., publisher and CEO of The Washington Post
- Dean Lesher, California newspaper publisher
- Cliff Sloan, publisher of Slate magazine

== Military ==
- John F. Aiso, highest-ranking Japanese American Army officer in WW2, Legion of Merit honoree, later judge
- Charles J. Biddle, flying ace during the First World War, attorney and author
- Raynal Bolling, first high-ranking American officer killed in the First World War
- David M. Brahms, brigadier general in the United States Marine Corps
- Ben Ferencz, chief prosecutor for the U.S. Army at the Einsatzgruppen trial
- Manning Ferguson Force (1848), Union leader in the American Civil War
- Hildreth Frost, judge advocate in Colorado National Guard during the Colorado Coalfield War
- George Henry Gordon, Union general during the American Civil War; military historian
- Albert G. Jenkins (1850), Confederate brigadier general during the American Civil War and congressman from Virginia (1857–61)
- Mark S. Martins (1990), brigadier general (United States Army) and chief prosecutor of Military Commissions
- Samuel Underhill, naval aviator
- Ken Watkin, brigadier general and judge advocate general of the Canadian Forces
- Charles White Whittlesey, led the Lost Battalion in the Argonne Forest during the First World War

== Spies ==
- Helge Boes, CIA agent
- John T. Downey, CIA agent captured in China
- Alger Hiss, alleged spy of the Soviet Union

== Sports ==
- Sandy Alderson (J.D., 1976), senior advisor of the Oakland Athletics
- Bob Arum, boxing promoter
- Mike Brown, owner of the Cincinnati Bengals
- Sashi Brown, president of the Baltimore Ravens
- Brian Burke, president of hockey operations for the Calgary Flames
- Dick Button, figure skater and figure skating commentator
- Steve Clark, freestyle swimmer, multiple Olympic gold medallist and former world record holder
- Don Cohan, Olympic bronze medalist in sailing
- Lou DiBella, boxing promoter
- Len Elmore, professional basketball player, sportscaster
- Larry Fleisher, sports agent; helped found the NBA Players Association
- Russ Granik, deputy commissioner of the NBA
- Eddie Grant, Major League Baseball player (1905–1915), nicknamed "Harvard Eddie"
- Rick Hahn (J.D., 1996), general manager of the Chicago White Sox
- Rick Horrow, sports business expert
- Ralph Horween, Harvard Crimson and NFL football player
- Hayes Alan Jenkins, figure skater
- Rob Manfred, commissioner of Major League Baseball
- Jeffrey Orridge, commissioner of the Canadian Football League
- Tony Petitti, president and CEO of the MLB Network
- Michael Weiner (J.D. 1986), executive director of the Major League Baseball Players Association

== Other ==
- Myron Avery, Appalachian Trail hiker and travel guide author
- Andy Bloch, champion poker player
- Ruben Bolling (J.D. 1987), cartoonist, author of Tom the Dancing Bug
- Richard Henry Dana Jr. (1837), writer on sea life and expert on maritime law
- William Austin Dickinson, older brother of poet Emily Dickinson
- Amanda Goad, winner of the Scripps National Spelling Bee and Jeopardy! Teen Tournament
- Charles Goldfarb, co-inventor of the markup language concept
- Erika Harold, winner of the Miss America contest
- Gardiner Greene Hubbard, founder and first president of the National Geographic Society
- Arnold W. G. Kean, developed civil aviation law
- Joel I. Klein, New York City school chancellor
- Richard Lederer, author of books on language and wordplay
- Robert Malley, analyst of the Israeli–Palestinian conflict
- Scotty McLennan, author and dean of religious life at Stanford University
- George S. Morison (1866), bridge designer
- Cara Mund, Miss America 2018
- Michelle Obama, First Lady of the United States
- George Padmore, Pan-Africanist figure
- Francis Parkman, freelance historian and horticulturalist
- Joan Whitney Payson, philanthropist and patron of the arts
- Michael Rustad, law school professor and prolific author
- Walter H. Seward (LL.B. 1924), third oldest living American and seventh-oldest living human
- David Spindler, independent scholar of the Great Wall of China
- William Stringfellow, lay theologian
- Sonam Dechen Wangchuck (LL.M. 2007), Princess of Bhutan
- Mary Allen Wilkes, LINC computer designer and first home computer user
- James H. Wolff (class of 1874; 1847–1913), lawyer, war veteran, first African-American admitted to practice law in the federal courts in Maryland

== Non-graduates ==
These students attended Harvard Law but, for various reasons, did not graduate.

- Brooks Adams, historian
- Larz Anderson, diplomat and businessman, U.S. ambassador to Japan (1912–13)
- William Christian Bullitt Jr. (dropped out 1914), U.S. ambassador to the Soviet Union (1933–1969)
- William Bundy, CIA figure who had a role in planning the Vietnam War
- Allan B. Calhamer, developed the board game Diplomacy
- Daniel Henry Chamberlain (dropped out 1863), governor of South Carolina
- Frank Church (transferred), U.S. senator from Idaho (1957–81)
- John Sherman Cooper (dropped out), U.S. senator from Kentucky (1946–1949, 1952–1955, 1956–1973)
- Danny Fields (dropped out 1959), figure in the underground New York punk rock scene
- Melville Fuller (dropped out 1855), chief justice of the U.S. Supreme Court
- Ruth Bader Ginsburg (transferred), U.S. Supreme Court justice (1993–2020)
- Arthur A. Hartman (dropped out 1948), U.S. ambassador to France (1977–1981), U.S. ambassador to the Soviet Union (1981–1987)
- Henry James, novelist; author of The Bostonians and Washington Square
- Jodi Kantor (dropped out), reporter and editor on culture and politics for The New York Times
- Philip Kaufman, film screenwriter and director
- Joseph P. Kennedy Jr., left before his last year to serve in WWII, where he was killed
- Michael Kinsley (transferred), journalist, editor, and host of Crossfire
- Nicholas Longworth (transferred), speaker of the House (1925–31)
- Greg Mankiw (dropped out 1984), economist
- Pat McCormick, comic actor and writer
- Gordon McLendon, created Top 40 radio format
- Louis Menand (dropped out 1974), cultural and intellectual historian
- William Henry Moody (dropped out), U.S. Supreme Court justice (1906–1910), U.S. attorney general (1904–1906), U.S. secretary of the Navy (1902–1904), congressman from Massachusetts (1895–1902)
- George Murdock, anthropologist
- John Negroponte (dropped out 1960), U.S. deputy secretary of state, director of National Intelligence
- Cole Porter, composer and songwriter
- Roscoe Pound (dropped out 1890), dean of Harvard Law School
- Donald Regan, U.S. secretary of the treasury (1981–1985), White House chief of staff (1985–1987)
- Angelo Rizzuto, photographer
- Robert Rubin (dropped out), secretary of the treasury
- William James Sidis (dropped out 1919), child prodigy
- Alfred Dennis Sieminski (dropped out 1936), congressman from New Jersey (1951–1959)
- Adlai Stevenson II (dropped out), governor of Illinois (1949–1953) and Democratic presidential candidate (1952, 1956)
- Joe Vila (dropped out), sports writer
- Robert W. Welch Jr. (dropped out), founder of the anticommunist John Birch Society

== Fictitious alumni ==
- Philip Banks, character on the TV series The Fresh Prince of Bel-Air
- Rafael Barba, Manhattan ADA on Law & Order: Special Victims Unit
- Oliver Barrett, main character in the film Love Story and its sequel Oliver's Story
- Cable, superhero from the X-Force and X-Men comic books
- Frasier Crane, main character on TV series Frasier
- Lindsay Dole, character on the TV series The Practice
- Jerry Espenson, character on the TV series Boston Legal
- Artemus Gordon, character in the film Wild Wild West
- Ainsley Hayes, character on the TV Series The West Wing
- Miranda Hobbes, character on the TV series Sex and the City
- Thurston Howell, III, character on the TV series Gilligan's Island
- Annalise Keating, main character on the TV series How to Get Away With Murder
- Louis Litt, character on the TV series Suits
- Ally McBeal, main character in the eponymous TV series
- Mitch McDeere, main character in the TV series The Firm and the John Grisham novel from which it was adapted
- Jamie Reagan, main character on Blue Bloods
- Harvey Specter, character on the TV series Suits
- Frank Underwood, fictional majority whip of U.S. House of Representatives, vice president and president of the United States, main character on the TV series House of Cards
- Elle Woods, main character in the Legally Blonde films and musical
