= Zev Buffman =

American theatre director (1930–2020)

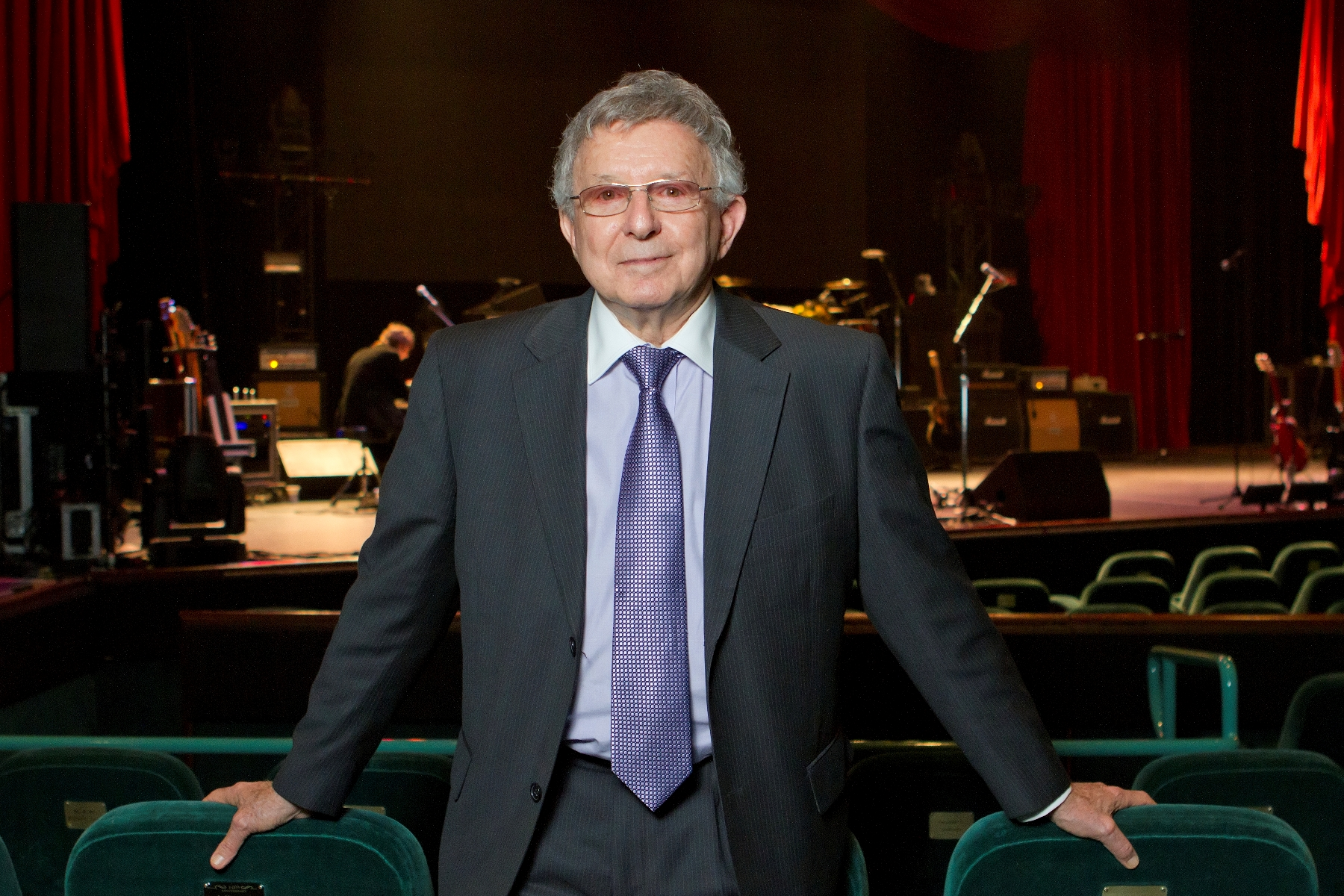
- Born: October 11, 1930; Tel Aviv, Mandatory Palestine
- Died: April 1, 2020 (aged 89); Seattle, Washington, U.S.
- Occupations: Theatre and film producer; Sports team owner
- Organizations: Ruth Eckerd Hall
- Spouse: Vilma Buffman

Zev Buffman (born Ze'ev Bufman) (October 11, 1930 – April 1, 2020) was a Broadway producer who served as president and CEO of Ruth Eckerd Hall in Clearwater, Florida. He produced more than 40 Broadway shows. He partnered with Elizabeth Taylor to present her in her Broadway debut, The Little Foxes. Buffman was also the co-founding general partner of the NBA champion basketball team the Miami Heat.

== Life and career ==
Buffman was born in Tel Aviv, Palestine, to Ukrainian Jewish parents. His initial involvement in the performing arts began in 1947, while in the 89th Commandos. At the age of 16, he debuted as a stand-up comic throughout Israel, entertaining troops in periods of cease fire during the 1948 Arab–Israeli War. Zev served from 1947 to 1950, and returned for the Six Day War as well as the Yom Kippur War. He came to the United States as a foreign exchange student in 1951, moved to Hollywood, California, and worked as an actor while attending college. His first role was playing an Arab guard in the film Flight to Tangier. His most memorable film work was a role in the Cecil B. DeMille classic The Ten Commandments.

In 1958, he produced the Arnold Schulman play A Hole in the Head in Los Angeles and also opened one of the first dinner theaters, Le Grand. His first Broadway show, Vintage 60, an original musical revue, was produced in partnership with Broadway's David Merrick, and played at the Brooks Atkinson Theatre in 1960, but was a flop. He also produced Pajama Tops which became a hit at Seattle World's Fair in 1962 and played Broadway in 1963.

By 1962, Buffman operated five theaters in Los Angeles. Pajama Tops went on tour to Miami, Florida and Buffman leased the historic Coconut Grove Playhouse for the 1962–63 season. In 1966, Buffman bought the Playhouse for $650,000 and renovated it. He was the president/CEO/owner until 1970 when he sold it to Eddie Bracken for $1 million. He also established the Coconut Grove Arts Festival.

In 1967, his Your Own Thing became the first off-Broadway musical to win the New York Drama Critics' Circle award for Best Musical. That year he started leasing the newly built Parker Playhouse, Fort Lauderdale's first theater, for 23 years.

Paul Sills' Story Theatre won two Tony Awards in 1971 and he signed a contract with NBC and CTV Television Network in Canada to turn it into a television series.

He signed a five-year contract with Universal Pictures as producer-special projects. With partner Hugh Hefner as co-producer, they delivered the first part-animation, part live-action film The Naked Ape in 1973, based on the best-selling book by Desmond Morris, but the film flopped and he abandoned filmmaking.

In 1974, he was involved in a pilot for ABC television, Fantasies Fulfilled, starring Walter Matthau, which later became the hit series Fantasy Island.

From 1976 to 1990, he was President of the Miami Beach Theater of the Performing Arts (later renamed the Jackie Gleason Theater of the Performing Arts), located in Miami Beach, Florida. He helped renovate the theater complex and acquired an exclusive theatrical lease and brought in Broadway performers, including Julie Andrews, Liza Minnelli, Angela Lansbury and Yul Brynner. The opening of the 3,000-seat performing arts center was part of the real estate comeback of South Beach and the nearby Lincoln Mall.

Buffman was a general partner/ producer at the Chicago Theatre from 1977 to 1981, along with partner Frank Sinatra. At this national landmark theater, he partnered with the city of Chicago to oversee a $50 million restoration and reopening. Upon completion, Buffman presented Broadway shows and concert performances by internationally known artists.

In 1978 he added the Mayor Bob Carr Performing Arts Centre in Orlando, Florida to his circuit of theaters and started an expansion of his circuit.

In 1981 he entered a lease for the Royal Poinciana Playhouse in Palm Beach, Florida for the winter season. The Little Foxes starring Elizabeth Taylor was performed at the Royal Poinciana Playhouse and the Parker Playhouse. It later toured and brought Taylor to her Broadway debut and led to the formation of the Elizabeth Taylor Group.

In 1982 Buffman, together with Pace Theatrical, purchased and fully restored the vintage 1927 3,000-seat Saenger Theatre in the French Quarter in New Orleans. Working with his partners at Pace Theatrical, the Saenger Theatre became a national landmark and New Orleans' new home for the performing arts.

The same year, he also collaborated with Andrew Lloyd Webber as lead producer of the original Broadway production of Joseph and the Amazing Technicolor Dreamcoat.

In 1983 he brought Taylor and Richard Burton together to the Broadway stage in the revival of Private Lives.

In 1985, his presentations of Requiem for a Heavyweight and Jerry's Girls moved from Florida to Broadway but both were unsuccessful there and Buffman decided to take a sabbatical from New York theater.

In 1986 he had discussions with Miami Arena leader Rick Horrow, former NBA star Billy Cunningham and Carnival Cruise Lines owner Ted Arison to create an NBA Basketball franchise. In 1987, the franchise for the Miami Heat was awarded and in 1988, Buffman became the founding general partner of the Miami Heat with Ted Arison. Buffman also helped with the fundraising efforts to build the Miami Arena, where the Heat played until 1999. With his involvement in Miami Heat and the death of his father Mordecai, he decided to make his sabbatical from New York theater permanent.

In 1987, Buffman-Pace acquired the Tampa Bay Performing Arts Center in Tampa, Florida and also the Chicago Theater.

During the 1970s and early 1980s, he launched the "Zev Bufman Broadway Series" in Fort Lauderdale, St. Petersburg (Bayfront Center), Palm Beach, Orlando, Jacksonville, Norfolk, New Orleans and Chicago.

In 1988 Buffman-Pace sold the Chicago Theater to Donjo Medlevine and Buffman sold the Zev Bufman Theater Partnership to Pace Theatrical, who took over the Florida theater circuit of six theatres and 75,000 subscribers. Buffman decided to withdraw from the theatrical industry to pursue sports and amphitheater development.

From 1967 to 1995, Buffman produced shows as owner of Buffman Entertainment and Sports. He also produced film, television and cast recordings of Broadway shows under his company, Zev Buffman Entertainment, Inc.

In the 1990s, Buffman began a new partnership with Wayne Huizenga of Blockbuster Video to become a major player in the concert business. As the President/CEO he planned, built and oversaw four new 20,000-seat outdoor amphitheaters in Phoenix, Southern California, Charlotte and West Palm Beach. The venues were sold to SFX in 1997.

In 2003, Buffman became CEO of RiverPark Center in Owensboro, Kentucky. While there, he founded the International Mystery Writers' Festival.

In 2011, Buffman was named the President & CEO of Ruth Eckerd Hall, Inc., a performing arts venue in Clearwater, Florida that also operates the Nancy and David Bilheimer Capitol Theatre. He collaborated with the city on the renovation of this historic theater in downtown Clearwater, which reopened in December, 2013. Ruth Eckerd Hall, Inc. also produced concerts for the Major League Baseball team the Tampa Bay Rays, and other organizations and events throughout the United States. Buffman retired in October 2018.

Other positions he held include:

- Wolftrap Amphitheatre Galas and Co-chair/Producer with First Lady Mrs. Nancy Reagan
- University of Tel Aviv Chair/Producer - Fundraising
- New World Symphony Gala Producer - Co-Founder

== Credits ==
=== Broadway producing credits ===
- Blithe Spirit (Broadway 2009)
- Jerry's Girls (Broadway 1985–1986)
- The News (Broadway 1985)
- Requiem for a Heavyweight (Broadway 1985), starring John Lithgow & George Segal
- Peg (Broadway 1983)
- The Corn is Green (Broadway 1983), with Cicely Tyson
- Private Lives (Broadway 1983), starring Richard Burton & Elizabeth Taylor
- A View from the Bridge (Broadway 1983)
- Joseph and the Amazing Technicolor Dreamcoat (Broadway 1982–1983)
- The First (Broadway 1981)
- Oh, Brother! (Broadway 1981)
- The Little Foxes (Broadway 1981), starring Elizabeth Taylor
- Brigadoon (Broadway 1980–1981)
- West Side Story (Broadway 1980)
- Oklahoma! (Broadway 1979–1980)
- Peter Pan (Broadway 1979–1981), starring Sandy Duncan
- Ovid's Metamorphoses (Broadway 1971)
- Paul Sills' Story Theatre (Broadway 1970–1971)
- Buck White (Broadway 1969), with Muhammad Ali
- Jimmy Shine (Broadway 1968–1969), starring Dustin Hoffman
- Soldiers (Broadway 1968)
- Mike Downstairs (Broadway 1968)
- Your Own Thing (NY Drama Critics Award- Best Producer of a Musical)
- Spofford (Broadway 1967–1968), with Melvyn Douglas
- The Persecution and Assassination of Jean-Paul Marat as Performed by the Inmates of the Asylum of Charenton Under the Direction of the Marquis de Sade (Broadway 1967)
- Minor Miracle (Broadway 1965)
- Fair Game for Lovers (Broadway 1964), starring Alan Alda
- Pajama Tops (Broadway 1963)
- The Egg (Broadway 1962)
- Vintage '60 (Broadway 1960)

=== Touring productions ===
- Pajama Tops
- Jimmy Shine, starring Dustin Hoffman
- Porgy & Bess
- Story Theatre
- Peter Pan
- Oklahoma!
- West Side Story
- Nine
- On Your Toes
- The King & I, starring Yul Brynner
- Gypsy, starring Angela Lansbury
- Jerry's Girls, starring Carol Channing
- Applause, starring Lauren Bacall
- A Lion in Winter, starring George C. Scott
- A Man for All Seasons, starring Charlton Heston
- 7 Brides for 7 Brothers, starring Howard Keel

=== Original cast albums ===
- Oklahoma!
- Peter Pan
- West Side Story
- Buck White
- Oh Brother
- Story Theatre
- Jerry's Girls
- Joseph and the Amazing Technicolor Dreamcoat
- Vintage '60

== Awards/Honors ==
Sources:

- Carbonnel Award- Named Best Producer six times (Florida)
- Producer of the Year: Wolftrap Amphitheatre, Washington, D.C
- Man of the Year Awards: Miami, Oklahoma City, New Orleans, Palm Beach, Baltimore, Miami Beach, Orlando, Tampa, St. Petersburg
- Wharton School of Business- FL, Distinguished Achievement Award
- Entrepreneur of the Year 2008- Owensboro, KY
- Nomination for 1971 Tony Award Best Play (Tony Sills' Story Theatre)
- Nomination for 1980 Tony Award Reproduction (Play or Musical - Peter Pan)
- Nomination for 1981 Tony Award Reproduction (Play or Musical - The Little Foxes)
- Nomination for 1981 Tony Award Reproduction (Play or Musical - Brigadoon)
- Nomination for 1982 Drama Desk Award Outstanding Musical (Joseph and the Amazing Technicolor Dreamcoat)
- Nomination for 1982 Tony Award Best Musical (Joseph and the Amazing Technicolor Dreamcoat)
- Nomination for 1983 Tony Award Best Reproduction (Play or Musical - A View from the Bridge)
- Nomination for 2009 Drama Desk Award Outstanding Revival of a Play (Blithe Spirit)
- The New York Drama Critics Award Best Musical (Your Own Thing, 1967-1968)
- State of Florida Ambassador of the Arts
- 2010 Raven Award- Mystery Writers of America
