= Joseph P. Liu =

American legal scholar

- Born: Seattle, Washington, U.S.

Academic background
- Education: Yale University (BA); Columbia University (JD)

Academic work
- Discipline: Law
- Sub-discipline: Intellectual property Criminal law
- Institutions: University of California College of the Law, San Francisco; Harvard Law School; Boston College

Joseph P. Liu is an American legal scholar working as a professor at the Boston College Law School. He has published a number of papers and articles on the subjects of intellectual property law, law and the internet, and internet regulation.

== Early life and education ==
Liu was born in Seattle, Washington. In 1989, he received his Bachelor of Arts degree in physics and philosophy from Yale University. In 1994, he earned a Juris Doctor from the Columbia Law School, where he was editor-in-chief of the Columbia Law Review.

== Career ==
After law school, Liu worked as clerk for Judge Levin H. Campbell of the United States Court of Appeals for the First Circuit. He then worked as a litigator at Foley, Hoag & Eliot in Boston, Massachusetts, specializing in intellectual property litigation, securities litigation, and white collar criminal defense.

In 1999, Liu was appointed assistant professor at the University of California, Hastings College of the Law. He also worked as vice president and general counsel at BuyerZone, a business-to-business start-up company. He was a Climenko Teaching Fellow in the Lawyering Program at Harvard Law School from 1997 to 1998.

Liu is a professor of law at the Boston College Law School, where he writes and teaches in the areas of copyright, trademark, property, and internet law. His main area of academic research is on the impact of digital technology on copyright law and markets, with a particular focus on how digital technology is changing the way individuals interact with copyrighted works.
