= Foley Hoag =

Law firm based in Boston

Foley Hoag LLP
- Headquarters: Boston, Massachusetts
- No. of offices: 5
- No. of attorneys: approximately 250
- Major practice areas: Life sciences, healthcare, technology, Energy and Cleantech, investment management, professional services, sovereign states
- Key people: James Bucking, Hathaway Pease Russell (co-managing partners)
- Date founded: April 1, 1943
- Founder: Henry Foley and Garrett Hoag
- Company type: Limited liability partnership
- Website: foleyhoag.com

Foley Hoag LLP (formerly Foley, Hoag & Eliot LLP) is a law firm headquartered in Boston, with additional offices in New York City, Paris, Washington, D.C., and Denver. The firm represents public and private clients in a wide range of disputes and transactions worldwide. It offers regional, national, and international legal services.

== History ==
The firm was founded on April 1, 1943, when Henry Elliot Foley teamed with Garrett Scattergood Hoag. The two founders began their firm in a three-room office at 10 Post Office Square in Boston's Financial District.

The firm was involved in Boston's early civil rights struggle and the Boston busing crisis when it represented the plaintiffs in a 1970s lawsuit that brought desegregation to Boston Public Schools. This legal victory resulted in the firm establishing the Foley Hoag Foundation, which focuses on improving race relations in Boston.

Foley Hoag is also involved in the Boston-area entrepreneurial community, providing counsel local technology startup companies. In 2002, the firm moved its main office to its current location in the Seaport District in South Boston.

Foley Hoag opened its first office outside of Massachusetts in Washington, D.C., in 1985, focusing on international litigation and arbitration practices. The firm's corporate social responsibility, government strategies and healthcare practices are also based in D.C. In June 2011, the firm opened an office in Paris to serve overseas companies and sovereign states in international arbitration and litigation matters. In May 2015, the firm opened its first office in New York to expand its intellectual property and international litigation practices.

From 2015 through early 2019, Martha Coakley, former Attorney General of Massachusetts, worked for Foley Hoag as a lawyer and lobbyist. While at the firm, Coakley represented the fantasy sports website DraftKings and student-loan firm Navient when state governments were examining the practices of these industries.

== Practice areas ==
Foley Hoag has industry-focused practices in energy and cleantech, education, life sciences, healthcare, investment advisers and private funds, professional services, sovereign states and technology.

The firm also has an international litigation and arbitration practice group which represents both corporations and foreign governments. In 2008 the firm successfully represented the government of Bolivia in a challenge to the nationalization of a telecom company. From 2010-2018, the firm's Global Business & Human Rights practice served as the Secretariat for the Voluntary Principles on Security and Human Rights.

== Notable alumni ==
- Alicia Barton, president and CEO, New York State Energy Research and Development Authority (NYSERDA).
- Martha Coakley, former Attorney General of Massachusetts.
- Vickie L. Henry, associate justice, Massachusetts Appeals Court.
- Joseph P. Liu, professor of intellectual property at Boston College Law School.
- Hans F. Loeser, retired senior partner, civil rights lawyer and Vietnam War opponent.
- Sandra Lea Lynch, judge on the United States Court of Appeals for the First Circuit.
- Michael Rustad, professor of law at Suffolk University Law School.
- Paul Tsongas, former United States Senator from Massachusetts.
- Barry B. White, former United States Ambassador to Norway.
- James Boyd White, professor at University of Michigan Law School.
- Gloria Cordes Larson, former president of Bentley University.

== Industry recognition ==
Some Foley Hoag attorneys appear annually in compendiums such as Chambers USA, Chambers Global, Best Lawyers, Latinvex, and Legal 500. Several of its practices have also been noted in publications such as U.S. News & World Report and Corporate Counsel

The firm has also been listed in various business and legal industry rankings as a premiere workplace. Vault's 2015 "Top Best Firms to Work For" list named Foley Hoag the third-best law firm to work for nationally. The firm also placed first nationally in firm culture, hours, and LGBT diversity, and was ranked in the top 10 in many other individual categories, including training and mentoring, pro bono work, and transparency. Foley Hoag has been in the Vault top 10 for several years, coming in at fifth for 2012, and sixth for both 2013 and 2014, and ninth in 2018.

In 2011, 2012 and 2013, the firm was recognized by the Boston Globe's "Top Places to Work" survey as a leading place of employment in Massachusetts. In 2014 the firm was ranked ninth nationally in The American Lawyer 2014 Mid-Level Associates Satisfaction survey.

Law360 named Foley Hoag a 2018 Regional Powerhouse, an accolade awarded to law firms handling some of the biggest deals and most high-profile courtroom battles that make a lasting impact on the law at the state and local level.
