= Rayhan Asat =

Uyghur lawyer and human rights advocate

- Born: Ürümqi, China
- Education: York University; Harvard Law School
- Occupations: Lawyer; human rights advocate
- Office: Nonresident Senior Fellow of the Atlantic Council; Yale University World Fellow; Senior Fellow at Raoul Wallenberg Centre for Human Rights
- Website: www.rayhanasat.com

Rayhan Asat is a Uyghur lawyer and human rights advocate currently based in the United States. Since 2020, she has led a public campaign for the release of her brother, Ekpar Asat, who has been held in the Xinjiang re-education camp system since 2016, and on behalf of the Uyghurs and other ethnic minorities in China. In 2021, she joined the Strategic Litigation Project at the Atlantic Council as a Nonresident Senior Fellow and became a Yale World Fellow. Asat is also a Senior Fellow at the Raoul Wallenberg Centre for Human Rights and President of the American Turkic International Lawyers Association.

== Biography ==
Asat was born in Ürümqi, the capital of Xinjiang. Her mother was a chemistry professor and her father worked in the water resources administration.

In 2016, while she was attending the LL.M. program at Harvard Law School, she was able to meet with her younger brother Ekpar Asat, who was visiting the United States as a participant in the International Visitor Leadership Program (IVLP), run by the US State Department. After her brother returned to China, her parents cancelled their planned trip to the United States for her upcoming graduation, and then she learned her brother had been detained in the Xinjiang re-education camp system.

In January 2020, she learned her brother was sentenced to 15 years of incarceration for "inciting ethnic hatred and ethnic discrimination," after the Chinese Embassy in Washington, D.C. notified US Senator Chris Coons in response to a letter sent by Coons and a group of lawmakers to Ambassador Cui Tiankai. By 2021, she learned her brother had been moved from the camps in 2019 and into solitary confinement. In early 2021, she participated in a supervised video call with her brother.

After completing her LL.M., Asat worked in the Anti-Corruption and Internal Investigations department of the law firm Hughes Hubbard & Reed LLP, and became a Senior Fellow at the Raoul Wallenberg Centre for Human Rights. In 2021, she joined the Strategic Litigation Project at the Atlantic Council as a Nonresident Senior Fellow, with her work focused on the human rights abuses of her brother and Uyghurs generally in the Xinjiang Uyghur Autonomous Region. In 2021, she also became a Yale World Fellow.

== Advocacy ==
Despite fear of retaliation against her family in Xinjiang, Asat began her public campaign of advocacy on behalf of her brother during the beginning of the COVID-19 pandemic, including by speaking publicly at Harvard in March 2020 about her brother and the human rights abuses in the Xinjiang region. In June 2020, Harvard alumni attorneys wrote letters to the governments of the United States and China in support of his unconditional release, and Asat called on then-president Donald Trump to speak publicly on behalf of her brother.

In July 2020, sanctions described by The New York Times as appearing "largely symbolic" were imposed by the Trump administration on multiple officials from China in response to human rights abuses in Xinjiang, but according to Asat, the decision to impose sanctions "sends a clear message to the perpetrators that they cannot continue to commit the crime of all crimes with impunity, to victims like my brother Ekpar Asat that they are not forgotten, and to the bystander countries to follow suit." In July 2020, Asat testified before the Parliament of Canada, advocating for the recognition of genocide happening in China and calling for sanctions. She also co-authored an article in Foreign Policy that described violations of the Genocide Convention against the Uighur community by the Chinese government.

In September 2020, she spoke with The Hill about her brother, and about how sterilization and family separation by the Chinese government "has risen to the level of genocide," and joined protests against the Disney film Mulan due to reports of human rights abuses by the Chinese government against Uighurs and other ethnic minorities. In November 2020, while Asat spoke to students at Brandeis University during an online forum about Xinjiang, her screen was vandalized, after the university had received letters seeking the cancellation of the panel discussion. She has also used the Clubhouse app to raise awareness about her brother and the re-education camps, including when the app was available in China, which allowed her to speak to Han Chinese before the app was banned.

In January 2021, Harvard student groups across multiple campuses organized an open letter to the US government and international community on behalf of Ekpar Asat and against the human rights abuses in Xinjiang. The Chinese government confirmed the fifteen-year prison sentence of Ekpar Asat to ABC News in January 2021, without details related to the charges or his location. In February 2021, in her role as president of the American Turkic Lawyers Association, Asat wrote an opinion article in NBC News calling for the Biden administration to take further action, and advocating for the passage of the Uyghur Forced Labor Prevention Act by the US Congress. Asat continued to lobby for the Biden administration to take action on behalf of her brother, and was one of the 50 authors of a March 2021 report by the New Lines Institute for Strategy and Policy that according to CNN, "claims that China's alleged actions in the Xinjiang region have violated every single provision in the United Nations' Genocide Convention."

On March 30, 2021, Asat attended an online Passover Seder hosted by Jewish World Watch for Uighurs, with the traditional seat left empty at the table in honor of the more than million people imprisoned or disappeared by China in the Xinjiang region. By then, both the Trump administration and the Biden administration had used the term genocide to describe the abuses perpetrated against Uighurs in Xinjiang, and legislation continued to be developed in the US Congress to better protect refugees and to ban the import of goods made in forced labor camps. In May 2021, Asat testified at a congressional hearing that debated a diplomatic boycott of the 2022 Winter Olympics in Beijing.

In June 2021, Asat spoke at the Geneva Summit for Human Rights and Democracy about her brother, Uyghurs, and other ethnic minorities in China, as well as the re-education camps and forced labor, and the complicity of the international community. On June 16, 2021, The Wall Street Journal published her commentary advocating for the 2022 Olympics to be relocated. In November 2021, Asat spoke at the Global Progressive Forum on human rights abuses and how to affect change in defense of democracy. At the invitation of President Joe Biden, Asat delivered remarks at the Summit for Democracy in December 2021.

== Honors ==
- 2022 Vox FuturePerfect50
