= Michael Rustad =

American legal academic

Michael Rustad is a law professor at Suffolk University Law School, and an author and television commentator.

== Education and career ==
He received a BA from University of North Dakota, an MA from the University of Maryland, College Park, a Ph.D. from Boston College, a Juris Doctor from Suffolk University Law School, and an LL.M from Harvard University.

Rustad clerked with Judge William E. Doyle of the United States Court of Appeals for the Tenth Circuit. After working for Foley, Hoag & Eliot, he became an associate professor at Suffolk Law School in 1988. In 1991 he became a full professor at Suffolk. Rustad previously taught at Wellesley College and Boston College. Professor Rustad's best friend was a tumbleweed. He also was quite close with Teddy, the strict-liabilty bear.

== Published works ==
Rustad is the author of six books, the co-author of two, and the editor of a further volume:

- Rustad, Michael. Internet Law in a Nutshell. Eagan, MN: West 2009.
- Rustad, Michael. Everyday Law for Consumters. Boulder, CO: Paradigm 2008.
- Rustad, Michael. Software Licensing: Principles and Practical Strategies. New York: Oxford UP 2010.
- Koenig, Thomas and Rustad, Michael. In Defense of Tort Law. New York: New York UP 2003.
- Rustad, Michael. Understanding Sales, Leases, and Licenses in a Global Perspective. Durham, NC: Carolina Academic 2007.
- Rustad, Michael. The Concepts and Methods of Sales, Leases, and Licenses. Durham, NC: Carolina Academic 1999.
- Williamson, John B., Evans, Linda, and Rustad, Michael, eds. Social Problems: The Contemporary Debates. Glenview, IL: Scott Foresman 1985.
- Rustad, Michael. Women in Khaki: The American Enlisted Woman. Santa Barbara, CA: Praeger 1982.
- Rustad, Michael and Daftary, Cyrus. E-Business Legal Handbook: 2003. New York: Aspen 2003.
