= Hans F. Loeser =

American lawyer and activist

Hans F. Loeser (September 28, 1920 – May 15, 2010) was an American lawyer whose activism during the Vietnam War earned him the enmity of Richard Nixon.

Born in Germany, Loeser served in the United States Army, 1942–1947. He then went to Harvard Law School, where he was an Editor and Officer of the Harvard Law Review from 1948 to 1950. He graduated magna cum laude in 1950 and began a long career at Foley Hoag in Boston.

He was active in several professional groups. His work as Chair of the Boston Lawyers' Vietnam Committee landed him on the master list of Nixon political opponents. He was then a long-term member emeritus of the Lawyers' Committee for Civil Rights Under Law in Boston.
