= Reed Shuldiner =

Professor Reed Shuldiner
- Occupation: Law professor
- Title: Alvin L. Snowiss Professor of Law; Co-Director of the Center for Tax Law and Policy

Academic background
- Education: Princeton University (BSE 1977); Harvard University Law School (JD 1983); Massachusetts Institute of Technology (PhD in Economics, 1985)

Academic work
- Institutions: University of Pennsylvania Law School

Reed Shuldiner is the Alvin L. Snowiss Professor of Law at the University of Pennsylvania Law School, and co-director of the Center for Tax Law and Policy.

== Biography ==
Shuldiner has a Bachelor of Science in engineering degree from Princeton University (1977), a juris doctor degree from Harvard University Law School (1983), and a doctor of philosophy degree in economics from Massachusetts Institute of Technology (1985). From 1984 to 1986 he was an associate at Wilmer, Cutler & Pickering.

Shuldiner is the Alvin L. Snowiss Professor of Law at the University of Pennsylvania Law School, and co-director of the Center for Tax Law and Policy.

Among his writings are "A Comprehensive Wealth Tax", with David Shakow, 53 Tax Law Rev. 499 (2000), "Indexing the Federal Income Tax", 48 Tax Law Review 537 (1993), and "A General Approach to the Taxation of Financial Instruments", 71 Texas Law Review 243 (1992).
