= Joseph Sandler =

Joseph Sandler (born 1953) is a Washington, D.C. attorney who served as in-house general counsel for the Democratic National Committee from 1993 to 1998 and continued in this role at his firm Sandler, Reiff & Young through 2009. He now serves as an adviser to prominent Democrats, state parties, and progressive organizations, such as Moveon.org.

Sandler shepherded the Democratic National Committee through massive change, including multiple leadership changes, and the implementation of the Bipartisan Campaign Reform Act, that Sandler famously referred to as a "fascist monstrosity" and accurately predicted would result in the national parties' loss of influence.

Sandler was born in 1953 in Baltimore MD, graduated summa cum laude from Harvard College in 1975 and cum laude from Harvard Law School in 1978. He served as counsel for the 1996, 2000, 2004 and 2008 Democratic National Conventions; for the Democratic Governors Association; and through his law firm, for numerous Democratic state party committees and Democratic and progressive advocacy groups, PACs and candidates. During Sandler’s tenure at the DNC, he defended several prominent Democrats and Democratic groups during controversies over alleged improprieties in fundraising and cooperation with 527 groups.

He chaired the task force on reform of FARA for the International Trade Committee of the ABA's Section on International Law; has served on the Executive Committee of the Election Law Committee of the ABA's Administrative Law Section; and currently serves on the Advisory Board of that Committee. He has spoken on numerous panels on campaign finance law and campaign finance reform sponsored by bar associations, colleges and universities and advocacy organizations.

== Publications ==
The Bipartisan Campaign Reform Act of 2002: Law and Explanation By Joseph E. Sandler and Neil P. Reiff (CCH, 2002).

"Taking some lessons from the top: What in-house counsel can learn from those lost White House e-mails." By Joseph E. Sandler and William A. McComas. Published in Legal Times, June 18, 2007.

"New Campaign Finance Rules and the 2004 Elections." By Joseph E. Sandler and Neil P. Reiff. Campaigns & Elections Magazine, February 2005.

"The Campaign Finance Minefield." An analysis of the impact of the Bipartisan Campaign Reform Act on state and local party committees. By Joseph E. Sandler and Neil P. Reiff. Campaigns & Elections Magazine, May 2004.

"What's Next for Free Speech: The Supreme Court upholds BCRA and throws open the door to new threats." An op-ed piece regarding the U.S. Supreme Court decision McConnell v. FEC. Joseph E. Sandler, Neil P. Reiff, and Larry S. Gibson. Published in Legal Times (December 15, 2003).

"Are Campaign Finance Laws Ready for the Internet Bandwagon?" Joseph E. Sandler and Neil P. Reiff. Campaigns & Elections Magazine, July 1999.
