= John Maktos =

American activist

John Maktos was an employee of the United States State Department from 1929 until 1962. In 1948 he served as chairman of the United Nations Committee on Genocide that drafted provisions to make genocide an international crime treated in the same way as piracy. In a 1973 interview Maktos describes the international law issues on which he worked as the State Department's first Assistant Legal Adviser for United Nations Affairs.

Maktos was a graduate of Harvard University and Harvard Law School.
