= Cheryl Mendelson =

American novelist and non-fiction writer

- Education: University of Rochester (PhD); Harvard Law School (JD)
- Occupations: Novelist; writer
- Spouse: Edward Mendelson
- Writing career
- Genre: Non-fiction

Cheryl Mendelson is an American novelist and non-fiction writer. She is the author of Home Comforts: The Art and Science of Keeping House (1999), and a trilogy of novels, Morningside Heights (2003), Love, Work, Children (2005), and Anything for Jane (2007). In 2019, Home Comforts was ranked by Slate as one of the 50 best nonfiction books of the past 25 years.

== Life and career ==
She received her Ph.D. in Philosophy from the University of Rochester and her J.D. from Harvard Law School. She was formerly a professor of philosophy at Purdue University and Columbia University, and published essays on ethical theory. She lectures at Barnard College.

She was also a lawyer with several New York law firms in the 1980s. In 1990–91, she was a Fellow at the Hastings Center.

Her husband, Edward Mendelson, is an English professor at Columbia University.
