= Daniel Arbess =

Canadian Investor

Daniel J. Arbess
- Born: Montreal, Quebec, Canada
- Education: Osgoode Hall Law School; Harvard Law School
- Title: Founder, CEO, Xerion Investments

Daniel J. Arbess is an American lawyer, investor and policy analyst. He founded investment firms Xerion Capital Partners and Xerion Investments and co-founded Stratton Investments, Taiga Capital Partners and Triton Partners.

== Early life ==
Arbess was born in Montreal, Quebec, Canada, and is a United States citizen. He received a JD from Osgoode Hall Law School in Toronto, and an LLM from the Harvard Law School. He was an affiliate at the John F. Kennedy School of Government and a fellow at the New York-based World Policy Institute.

== Career ==
Arbess joined the international law firm White & Case in 1987, after having been in the Kremlin as a foreign observer when Mikhail Gorbachev unveiled the policies of Glasnost and Perestroika. He was the first American lawyer to re-locate to Eastern Europe, moving to Prague in early 1990. He advised the Czechoslovak (later Czech) government on its economic transition, principally involving privatization policy and transactions. In 1992, at 31, he became the youngest partner in the history of White & Case and Head of its Global Privatization Group. Arbess advised the Czechoslovak government on the restructuring of its auto industry, including the 1991 sale of Skoda Auto to Volkswagen AG for $6.4 billion (at the time, among the largest cross-border M & A transactions in European history), and the restructuring and sale of its downstream petrochemicals industry to a consortium of international oil majors. Arbess' privatization advisory work extended to Russia, Vietnam, Israel and other countries.

Arbess has been a principal investor since 1995, first pursuing restructuring-oriented private transactions in Europe. He is a co-founder of investment firms Taiga Capital, Stratton Investments and Triton Partners and founder, CEO and CIO of Xerion Investments., having launched Xerion Investments and Xerion Capital Partners in 2003 with the backing of S. Donald Sussman and his Paloma Partners. Arbess sold Xerion Capital Partners to Perella Weinberg Partners and became a partner of that firm in 2007. He was CIO of the $3.25 Billion Xerion Hedge Funds from 2003 to 2014. Xerion's noted investments captured the devolution of Communism and phases of China's economic reforms; the U.S. housing and financial crisis; monetary policy reflation of financial markets after the 2008 crisis; and the restructuring of the U.S. airline and auto industries. He returned investor capital in late 2014 to pursue private interests and purposeful investment opportunities through Xerion Investments and its affiliates.

== Boards ==
Arbess is a member of the Board of Directors of the Global Virus Network, the Corporate Advisory Board of Cancer Expert Now and the Finance Working Group of the Healthy Brains Global Initiative. He is a lifetime member of the Council on Foreign Relations, is a member of the Atlantic Council and advises the Vaclav Havel Library Foundation. He was a co-founder of No Labels, a U.S. political organization promoting collaboration across the political spectrum.

== Published works ==
- Daniel J. Arbess (March 15, 2026) Apple's Cheap AI Bet Could Pay Off Big, The Wall Street Journal.
- Daniel J. Arbess (February 5, 2026) Kevin Warsh's Trilemma: Cutting Rates, Reducing Fed's Balance Sheet & Sustaining Financial Stability, Fortune Magazine.
- Daniel J. Arbess (January 23, 2026) Iran's Crisis is a Test of U.S. Moral Leadership, Los Angeles Times.
- Daniel J. Arbess & Guy Goldstein (January 8, 2025) Somaliland Meets the Definition of a State; "Palestine" Does Not, The Wall Street Journal.
- Daniel J. Arbess (October 29, 2023). "Israel at the Front Line of the Global War on Islamist Terror", The Jerusalem Post.
- Daniel J. Arbess (March 17, 2023). "Israel Could Become a Constitutional Democracy". The Wall Street Journal.
- Daniel J. Arbess (May 13, 2022). "The Inflation Tail is Wagging the Policy Dog". Project Syndicate.
- Daniel J. Arbess (March 31, 2022). "Finding Putin's Money". Project Syndicate.
- Daniel J. Arbess (February 22, 2022). "New Thinking for a New Cancer Moonshot". Project Syndicate.
- Daniel J. Arbess (December 4, 2020). "As Biden Enters Office the Stage is Set for More Mideast Breakthroughs". The Algemeiner Journal.
- Daniel J. Arbess (December 3, 2020). "Middle East Quick Start for Biden Diplomacy?". The Hill.
- Robert C. Gallo & Daniel J. Arbess (June 30, 2020). "An Old Vaccine May Help Against Coronavirus". The Wall Street Journal.
- Daniel J. Arbess & Stephen S. Roach (March 23, 2020). "U.S. Lives and Economic Stability Threatened by Coronavirus Conflict With China". The Hill.
- Daniel J. Arbess (July 10, 2019). "The Path to Peace: Step One Vision, Step Two Political Settlement". The Algemeiner Journal.
- Daniel J. Arbess (July 8, 2019). "Step One Vision, Step Two Political Settlement". The Jerusalem Post.
- Daniel J. Arbess (April 24, 2019). "Israel: A Multicultural Jewish Democracy?". The Jerusalem Post.
- Daniel J. Arbess (February 17, 2019). "Why Jordan is Key to Israeli-Palestinian Peace". The Algemeiner Journal.
- Daniel J. Arbess (January 2, 2019). "The True State Solution". The Wall Street Journal.
- Daniel J. Arbess (October 28, 2018). "Investors, Look Up From Your Algorithms". The Wall Street Journal.
- Daniel J. Arbess (September 14, 2018). "Get Ready for the Next Financial Crisis". The Wall Street Journal.
- Daniel J. Arbess (August 15, 2018). "Advice for a Palestinian Icon". The Wall Street Journal.
- Daniel J. Arbess (June 5, 2018). "Is Trump Following a Grand Mideast Strategy?". The Wall Street Journal.
- Daniel J. Arbess (February 28, 2018). "The Economy Looks Good Today, But the Next Debt Crisis Is on the Horizon". fortune.com. Fortune.
- Daniel J. Arbess (January 30, 2018). "The Crypto Community is Splitting in Two--And That's a Good Thing". fortune.com. Fortune.
- Daniel J. Arbess (April 13, 2017). "On Passover, Think About Liberating The State Of Israel". The Jerusalem Post.
- Daniel J. Arbess (November 22, 2016). "How Donald Trump Can Bring Jobs Back To America". Fortune.
- Daniel J. Arbess (August 16, 2016). "An Historic Moment: How Israel Can Bolster Its Standing and Strengthen Alliances l". The Algemeiner Journal.
- Daniel J. Arbess (July 19, 2016). "Turkey Coup: U.S. Must Lead From the Front". The Wall Street Journal.
- Daniel J. Arbess (June 15, 2016). "This Is The Future of Artificial Intelligence". Fortune.
- Daniel J. Arbess (May 5, 2016). "Leader's, Get To Work Already On America's Economic Challenges". Fortune.
- Daniel J. Arbess (February 19, 2016). "The Young and the Economically Clueless". The Wall Street Journal.
- Arbess, Daniel; ZuGuttenberg, Karl Theodor (February 12, 2016). "Jihad & a Geopolitical G-X: Winning the War and Building the Peace". CSIS. Center for Strategic and International Studies.
- Daniel J. Arbess (November 10, 2015). "It Was Duty, Not a Poisoned Chalice". The Wall Street Journal. Eastern Edition. The Wall Street Journal. ISSN 0099-9660.
- Daniel J. Arbess (November 8, 2015). "The Battle for the 2016 Middle Ground". The Wall Street Journal. Eastern Edition. The Wall Street Journal. ISSN 0099-9660.
- Daniel J. Arbess (October 19, 2015). "The Problems with U.S. Leaders in the Era of Social Media/". Fortune.
- Daniel J. Arbess (May 13, 2013). "Bring on the Helicopter Money". The Wall Street Journal.
- Daniel J. Arbess (October 11, 2011). "China Record Boosts Confidence This Is No Bubble". Bloomberg Businessweek.
- Daniel J. Arbess (August 12, 2011). "How To Win In A New Economic Framework". Institutional Investor.
- Arbess, Daniel (June 15, 2010). "Managing the Debt Crisis Means Rebalancing Global Consumption and Leverage". Institutional Investor's Alpha. Institutional Investor.|
- Arbess, Daniel & Varanese, James (Spring 1993). "On the frontier: What Your Lawyer Brings to Privatization in Eastern and Central Europe". Columbia Journal of World Business. Science Direct.
- Daniel J. Arbess (January 21, 1992). "Prague Has to Drive Fast in Economic Mud". The New York Times.|
- Daniel J. Arbess & Marlene Greenberg (March 13, 1989). "Moscow's Puzzle is How to Motivate the Soviet Worker". Los Angeles Times.|
- Daniel J. Arbess (October 1985). "Star Wars and Outer Space Law". Bulletin of the Atomic Scientists. 41 (9). Bulletin of the Atomic Scientists: 19-22: 19. Bibcode:1985BuAtS..41i..19A. doi:10.1080/00963402.1985.11456048.
- Arbess, Daniel & Epstein, William (May 1985). "Disarmament role for the United Nations". Bulletin of the Atomic Scientists. 26–28. Bulletin of the Atomic Scientists.
- Arbess, Daniel (1984). "The International Law of Armed Conflict in Light of Contemporary Deterrence Strategies: Empty Promise or Meaningful Restraint?". McGill Law Journal. 89 (142). McGill University Press.
- Daniel J. Arbess (1983). "Limitations on Legislative Override under the Canadian Charter of Rights and Freedoms: A Matter of Balancing Values". Osgoode Hall Law Journal. 21 (1). Osgoode Hall Law Journal: 1/83: 113–141.

== Bibliography ==
- Daniel Arbess, Sean Khozin, Visualizing GBM Success: SOC + Triple-Armed Immunotherapy Case Report: Future Trial Design Options. Oxford Journal of Neuro-Oncology, Volume 25, Issue Supplement_5, November 2023, Page v143.
- Daniel J. Arbess & Hal Harvey (June 1, 1992). Alternative Security: Beyond the Controlled Arms Race. Farrar Straus & Giroux. ISBN 978-0-8090-8051-9.
- Daniel J. Arbess (1987). Reykjavik and Beyond: The Democrats and Strategic Policy. Harvard Law School.
- Arbess, Daniel J.; Moravcsik, Andrew M. (1988). "Lengthening the Fuse: No-First-Use and Disengagement". In Nye Jr., Joseph S. (1988). Fateful Visions: Avoiding Nuclear Catastrophe. Cambridge: Ballinger. pp. 68-91. ISBN 978-0887302725.
