= Rob Saltzman =

American lawyer and academic

Robert M. Saltzman
- Occupations: Lawyer and an academic

Academic background
- Education: A.B., Government; J.D.
- Alma mater: Dartmouth College; Harvard Law School

Academic work
- Institutions: University of Southern California (USC) Gould School of Law

Robert M. Saltzman is an American lawyer and an academic. He is an Emeritus Professor of Lawyering Skills at the University of Southern California (USC) Gould School of Law.

Saltzman's work is focused in legal and professional ethics; the law school learning process; politics and the legislative process; statutory interpretation; and disability-related issues. He served on the Los Angeles Police Commission, responsible for overseeing the L.A. Police Department (LAPD), where he was central to ending the LAPD's association with the Boy Scouts of America due to their discriminatory policies and introducing the first LAPD policies regarding transgender individuals in 2012. In 2011, then-President Barack Obama selected him to join the White House Commission on Presidential Scholars.

Saltzman was awarded honors twice by the USC Law School Black Law Students' Association for fostering and supporting racial and ethnic diversity in student recruitment and for creating a "humane and meaningful academic environment."

== Education ==
Saltzman earned an A.B. in Government from Dartmouth College in 1976. He went on to earn his Juris Doctor degree from Harvard Law School in 1979.

== Career ==
After law school, Saltzman practiced law in Colorado for a year. In 1980, he moved to Southern California. That year, he joined USC Law School as an Adjunct Assistant Professor of Law, a role he held until 1981. In the 1980s, he worked for L.A. County government, initially as Legal Affairs/Justice Deputy to L.A. County Supervisor Edmund D. Edelman. His role involved handling justice issues related to the courts, the Los Angeles County D.A., and the Sheriff, as well as advocating for low-income and senior housing, civil rights, labor rights, and LGBTQ+ rights. Later in the decade, he served as Special Counsel to the L.A. County Director of Health Services, addressing hospital care, public health challenges including HIV/AIDS, and helping to oversee services across the county's hospitals and health centers.

In 1988, Saltzman joined USC Gould School of Law as Associate Dean and later Professor of Lawyering Skills. In 2000, he created the Law School's Academic Support Program to assist students who were not performing up to their academic potential. He retired in 2015, after which he was named Emeritus.

Saltzman remained involved in local and national government issues, serving for 10 years from 2007 to 2016 as one of five Police Commissioners, assigned by the Mayor of Los Angeles under the authority of the City Charter, to oversee policies and management of the LAPD. Between 2005 and 2007, he held the roles of Ethics Commissioner and Vice President of the Los Angeles City Ethics Commission, appointed by Antonio Villaraigosa, before resigning to join the Los Angeles Police Commission, also appointed by Villaraigosa. He is most known for his work on the Police Commission, where he helped tighten use-of-force policies, improve transparency through the public release of police recordings, and implementation of de-escalation and anti-profiling policies and procedures. He played a key role in ending the LAPD's association with the Boy Scouts of America due to discriminatory policies and introduced the department's first transgender-inclusive policies in 2012, influencing LGBTQ+ rights and inclusivity within the LAPD and the community—he also worked with the LAPD and LA Sheriff on LGBTQ+ civil rights issues within the criminal justice system. Additionally, he was a Commissioner on the Los Angeles County Probation Oversight Commission from 2020 to 2021.

Saltzman served from 2019 to 2023 as Commissioner and Vice Chair of the West Hollywood City Business License Commission, charged with licensing cannabis dispensaries. From 2023 to 2024, he served as Commissioner and Vice Chair of the West Hollywood City Public Safety Commission. Since 2021, he has served as an at-large member of the USC Department of Public Safety Community Advisory Board, appointed by USC President Carol Folt. He was appointed to the White House Commission on Presidential Scholars by then-President Obama, serving from 2011 to 2017.

== Personal life ==
Saltzman was married to Edward Pierce, whom he met in law school in the 1970s. They were together for 36 years until Ed's passing in 2015 and married in 2008 during the brief period of marriage equality in California. Their marriage was featured in The New York Times. Both were actively involved in LGBTQ+ charitable work, particularly with GLSEN and the Los Angeles LGBT Center, and co-founded the One Institute Youth Ambassadors for Queer History Program.
