= Rick Horrow =

- Occupations: Radio Talk Show Host; Sports Business Expert
- Website: www.horrowsports.com foxsports.com/horrow

Rick Horrow, as CEO of Horrow Sports Ventures (HSV), pioneered the business of sports. He is the Sports Business Analyst for SportsGrid, CNN/CNN International, and Fox Sports, and his signature radio program, FOX MoneyBall: The Cost of Winning, can be heard Sunday mornings at 9:00 a.m. Eastern time on over 150 North American Fox Sports Radio affiliates, including XM channel 142. He currently appears on Yahoo Sports Radio's Beyond The Scoreboard Wednesdays at 8ET. A popular commentator on the business, law and politics of sports, Horrow is a regular guest on Fox Sports' Best Damn Sports Show Period, and PBS's Nightly Business Report. He is the author of When The Game Is On The Line, and 2011's Behind the Scoreboard: An Insider's Guide to Business of Sport.

Horrow also appeared every Tuesday night on Scott Ferrall's Sirius Satellite Radio show on Howard 101.

Horrow graduated from Harvard Law School and earned his moniker, "The Sports Professor" as a Visiting Expert for the school's "Sports and the Law" course. In addition to his media endeavors, he serves as counsel to the law firm Squire Sanders and Dempsey in matters dealing with sports law and facility finance and development. He is an expert in sports violence, private-public partnerships, and the bundling of multiple urban initiatives.

Before selling a majority of HSV to Omnicom in 2000, Horrow served as a consultant to the NFL, NASCAR, PGA Tour, and Major League Soccer, among countless other professional sports franchises.
