= Reinhardt Canyon =

Coordinates: 33°45′32″N 117°03′23″W

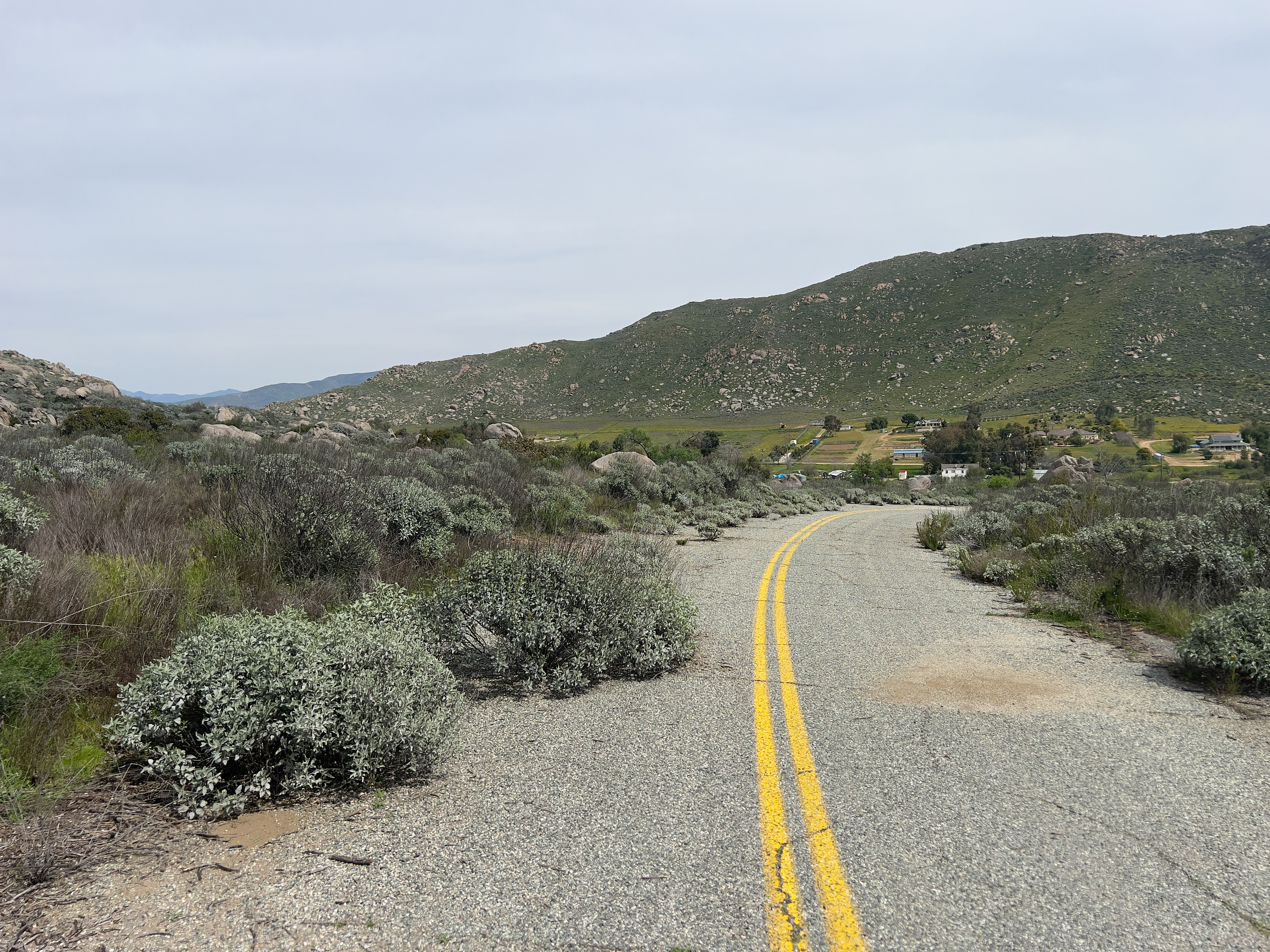
Settlements line the basin of Reinhardt Canyon.

Reinhardt Canyon is located in the Lakeview Mountains, just west of Hemet in Riverside County, California.

The prehistoric petroglyph known as the Hemet Maze Stone, California Historical Landmark No. 557, is located in the canyon.
