= Lakeview Mountains =

Mountain range in Riverside County, CA

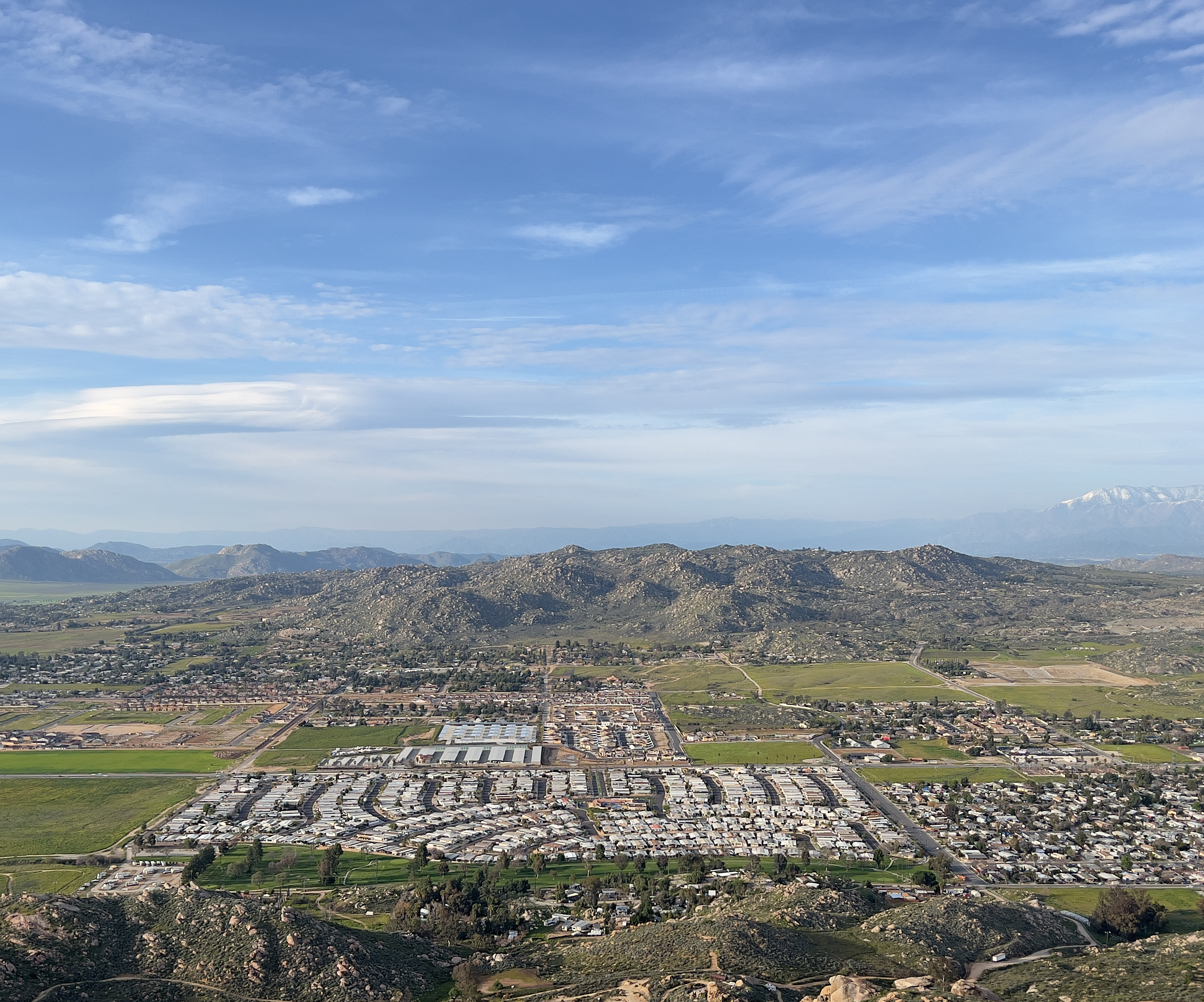
- Lakeview Mountains viewed from Double Butte, the community of Homeland, California, pictured here, lies to the south of the Lakeview Mountains

Highest point
- Elevation: 628 m (2,060 ft)

Geography
- Location within California
- Country: United States
- State: California
- District: Riverside County
- Range coordinates: 33°46′58.070″N 117°5′9.106″W
- Parent range: Peninsular Ranges
- Topo map: USGS Lakeview
- Biome: California chaparral and woodlands

The Lakeview Mountains are a range of low mountains encompassing approximately 30 square miles (80 km^{2}) of land in western Riverside County, Southern California, at the northern end of the Peninsular Ranges System.

== Geography ==
The Lakeview Mountains are bordered:

- on the south by State Highway 74 and the communities of Homeland and Green Acres
- on the east by the cities of Hemet and San Jacinto
- on the west by the Perris Valley and the community of Nuevo
- on the north by the community of Lakeview and the San Jacinto River. The communities of Juniper Flats and MacLean Ranch are located within the Lakeview Mountains.

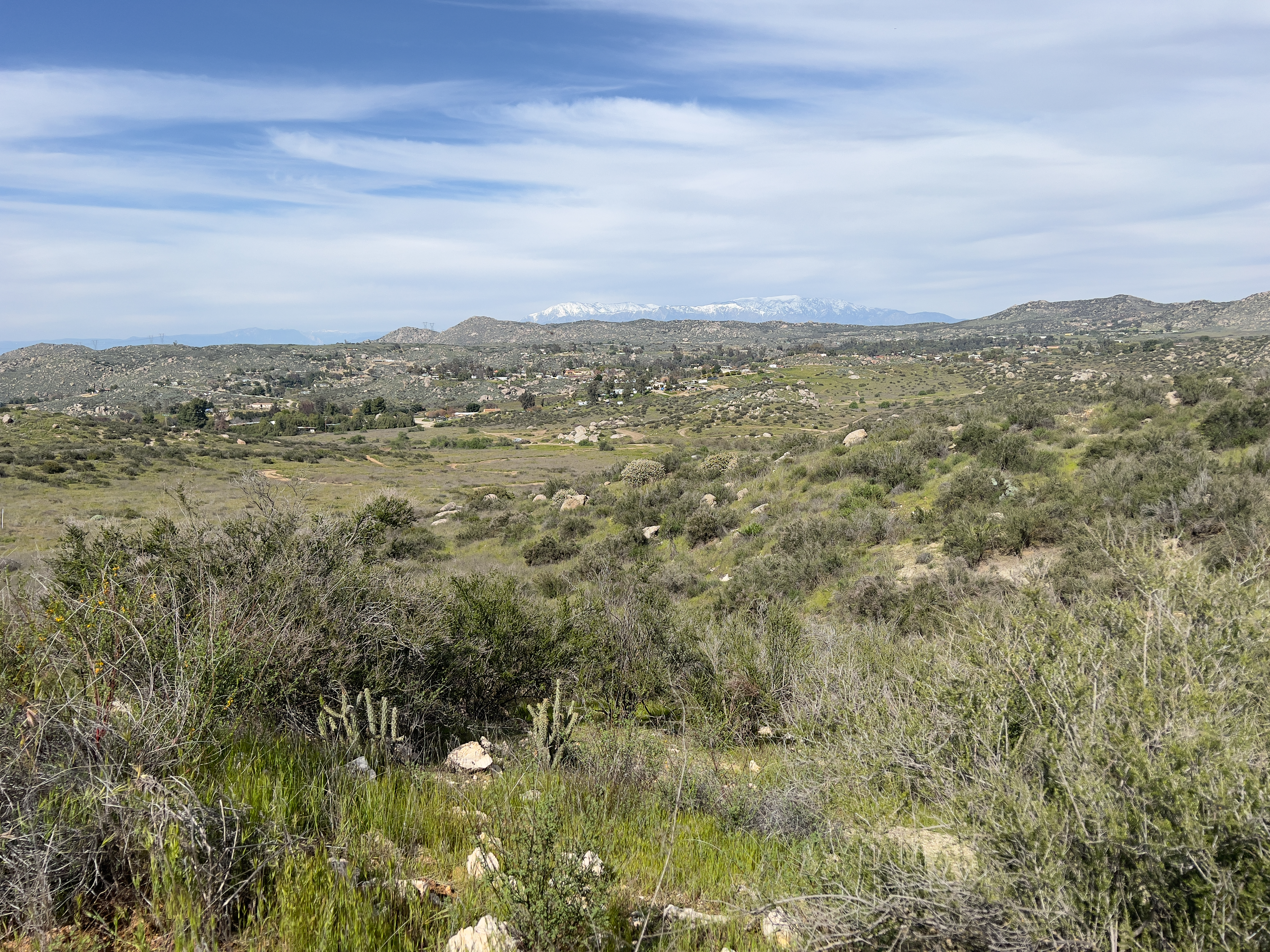
A landscape of the Lakeview Mountains with a distant view of the San Bernardino Mountains

The highest point in the Lakeview Mountains is at elevation 2,673 feet (815 m) above mean sea level. Mount Rudolph, a prominent feature at the northerly end of the range, rises to an elevation of 2,595 ft (791 m).

Petroglyph

Reinhardt Canyon, on the easterly side of the range, is the home of the prehistoric petroglyph known as the Hemet Maze Stone (California Historical Landmark No. 557).

== Flora ==
The vegetation of the Lakeview Mountains consists primarily of the Coastal Sage Scrub and Montane chaparral and woodlands plant communities.

== Geology ==
The Lakeview Mountains are the primary visible trace of the Lakeview Mountains Pluton, consisting primarily of Cretaceous tonalite.

== See also ==
- California chaparral and woodlands
