= Hemet Maze Stone =

Petroglyph in Hemet, California, US

Coordinates: 33°46′53.04″N 117°03′23.29″W

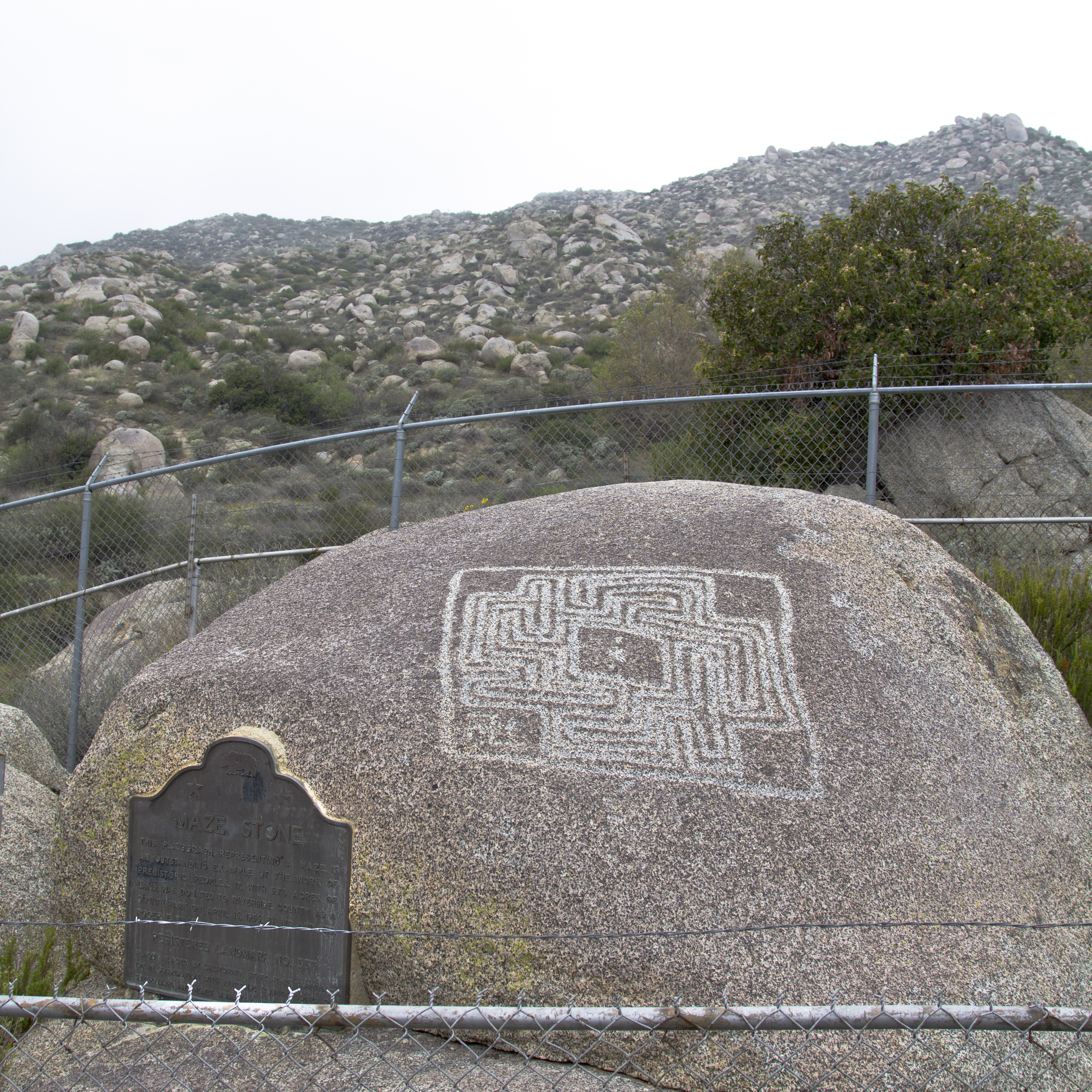
- Maze Stone with plaque
- Interactive map of Hemet Maze Stone
- Location: Outside Hemet in Reinhardt Canyon

California Historical Landmark
- Reference no.: 557

The Hemet Maze Stone is a prehistoric petroglyph. It is just outside Hemet, in Reinhardt Canyon, within the Lakeview Mountains, in Riverside County, California. On April 16, 1956, Mr. and Mrs. Rodger E. Miller donated the stone, along with 5.75 acres (23,300 m^{2}) of associated land, to Riverside County. It is California Historical Landmark No.557. The government installed two perimeter chain link fences around the petroglyph landmark for protection.

The surrounding land has been set aside for the protection of native plants and animals (with a warning that the "natural features may be hazardous"). The property is located at the end of California Avenue to the north of Highway 74 and several miles east of Interstate 215. The road has been blocked off to prevent people from driving too close to the Maze Stone.

== Features ==
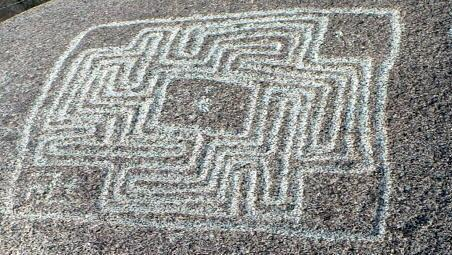
Closeup of the Maze Stone

The stone and its surrounding land were designated as a California state landmark in 1956. Sometime later, a vandal added a counter-clockwise swastika to one corner of the carving. While Nazis in Germany appropriated the swastika after WWI, they used the clockwise version of the swastika. Swastikas were also used in Oriental and Native American art long before the Nazis. The stone is protected by a pair of chain-link fences.

The "maze" consists of two rectangular boxes—one large and containing the other; centered. If one traces the patterns, one would find that between the boxes are two contiguous geometric patterns that resemble a maze. One "maze" is contained by the other on the left-hand side. Depending upon interpretation, the petroglyph could also show four walled structures or areas, consisting of two simple objects and two "maze-like" complex objects. There is an inner and outer object for each type of simple or complex object.

This petroglyph is classified as California Engraved, within the California Tradition of rock art.

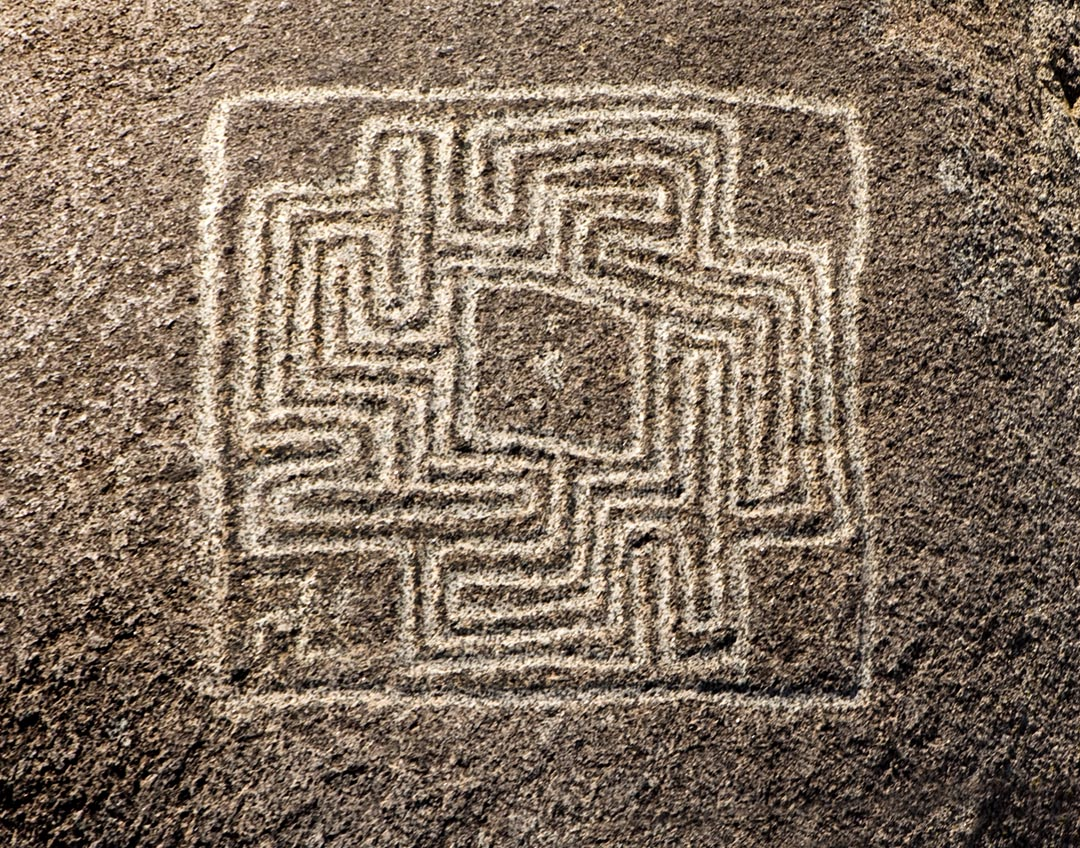
Hemet Maze Stone without distortions of viewpoint, as if from above. Width/height of maze is about 24 inches (61 cm).

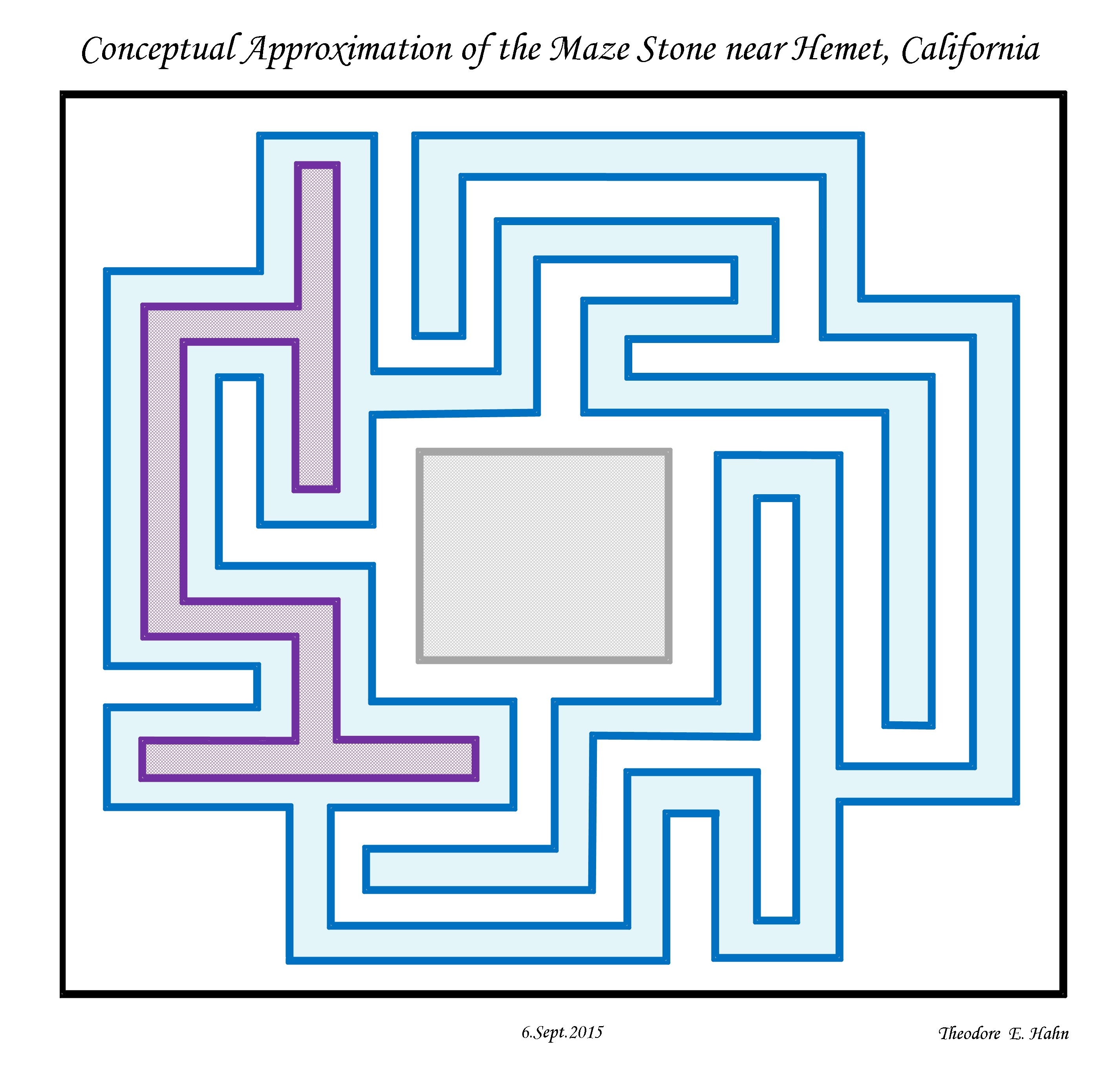
Conceptual Approximation of the Maze Stone

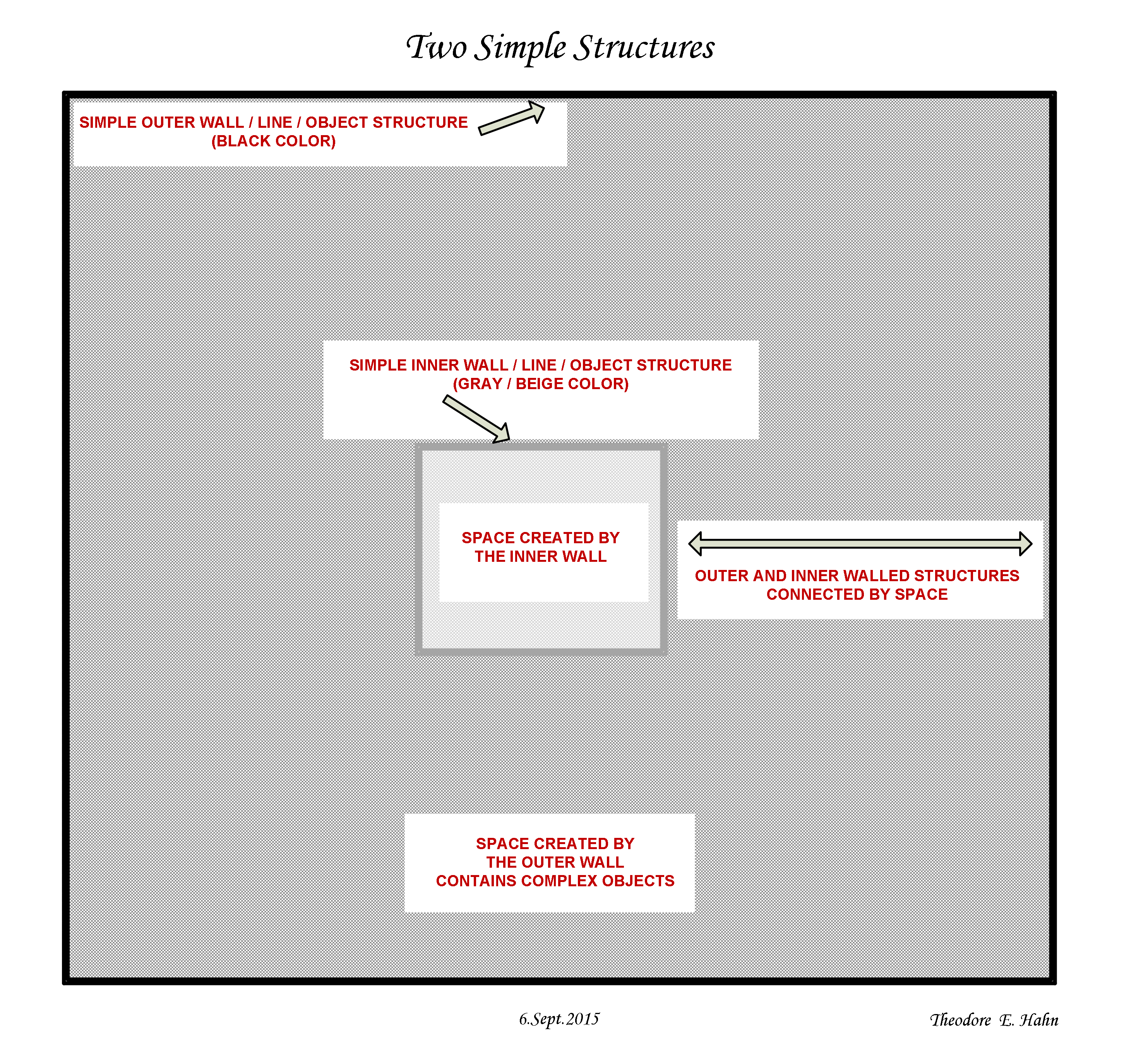
Diagram showing two possible square/rectangular walled structures or spaces derived from the pattern carved into the Hemet Maze Stone

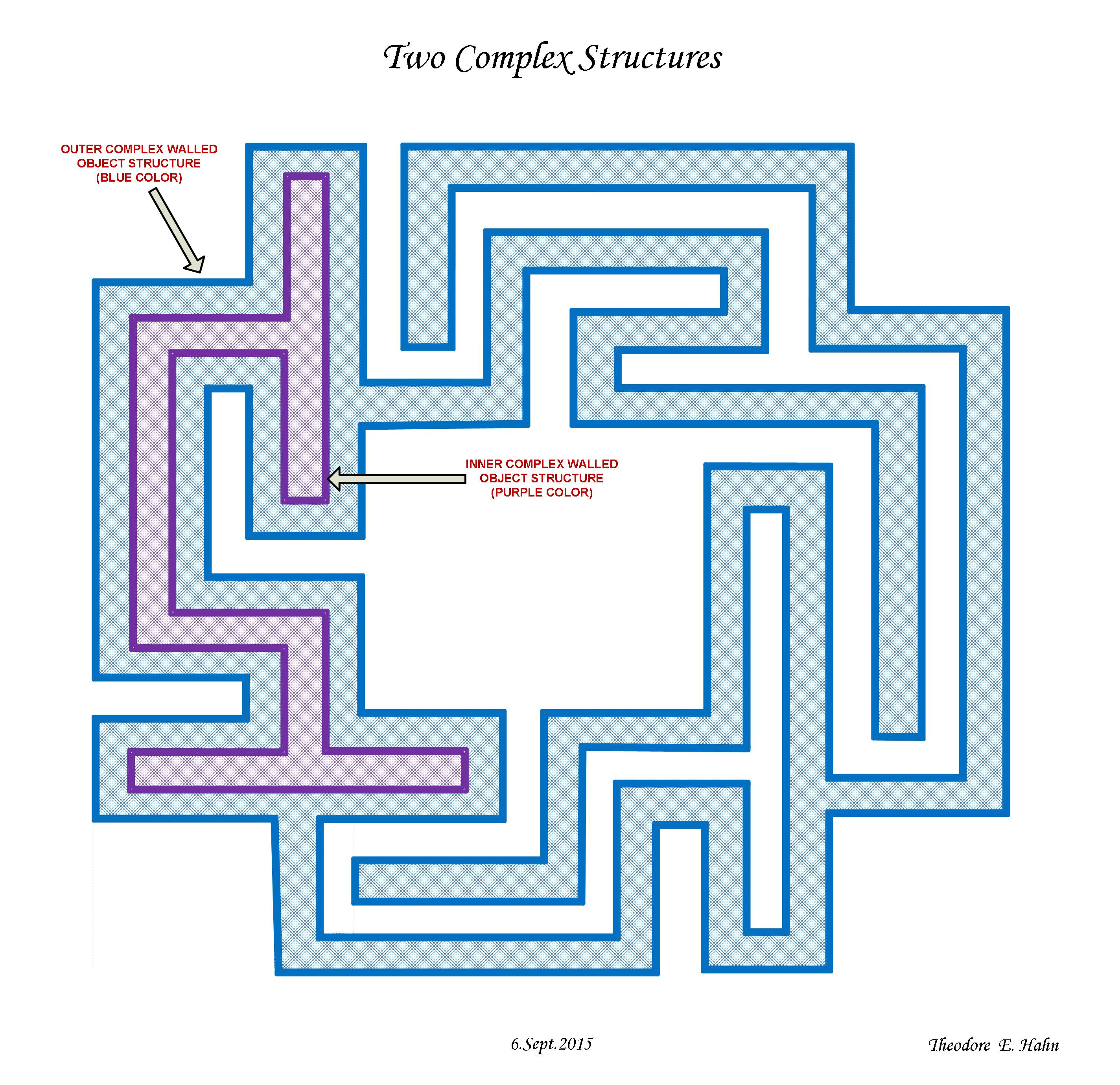
Diagram showing two possible block-like walled structures or spaces derived from the pattern carved into the Hemet Maze Stone
