= Hemet News =

Newspaper in Hemet, California

- A front page of the Hemet News in August 1941.
- Type: Daily newspaper
- Format: Broadsheet
- Editor: Joseph P. Kerr (1893 - 1897)
- Founded: 1893; 133 years ago
- Ceased publication: 1999; 27 years ago
- Language: English
- City: Hemet, California
- Country: United States
- Circulation: 22,000 (as of 1988)
- ISSN: 1077-1336
- OCLC number: 13042317
- Website: thehemetnews.com

The Hemet News was a newspaper in Hemet, California, published from 1893 until 1999 when it was merged into the Riverside Press-Enterprise.

== Ownership ==
=== Local-ownership ===
In December 1893, Joseph P. Kerr founded the Hemet News and worked as editor and publisher. He published the paper until he died of consumption on November 9, 1897, at age 32. A month later his widow Emma Louise Kerr leased the paper to Frank Fowler and J. William Tinker, of San Jacinto. In 1900, Mrs. Kerr leased the News to Peter Milliken.

Milliken soon acquired full ownership and published the paper until September 1911, when he sold it to R.C. Wall. Four months later Wall died of a hemorrhage of the lungs on January 28, 1912. That June, his widow sold the News to W.A. Potter. He soon sold a half-interest to John E. King and the rest of his stake to H.H. Monroe, of Riverside, in April 1913.

J.E. King was named postmaster of Hemet in 1915, and state printer in 1924. At that time his son Homer D. King took charge of the paper while he served in Sacramento. In 1932, E.L. Kerr died. In 1934, H.H. Monroe died, and his wife Lydia A. Monroe died in 1937. Her estate then sold the half stake to H.D. King, who became sole owner when his father died a year later. At that time James W. Gill Jr., was hired as advertising manager and became a business partner with H.D. King in 1942. His mother Georgia D. King died in 1946.

In 1956, the News was expanded from a weekly into a semi-weekly. In 1960, Gill became the sole owner. H.D. King became paralyzed from Muscular dystrophy and died on February 21, 1961. That same year, the News was expanded to three times a week, and then to six times a week in 1967. Gill was elected president of the California Newspaper Publishers Association for 1971, and president of the National Newspaper Association for 1979. Gill died in 1983. His son James W. Gill III then succeeded him at the News.

=== Corporate-ownership ===
In 1988, Gill III sold the company to Donrey Media Group. At that time the Hemet News had a 22,000 daily circulation. The sale included three weeklies: San Jacinto Valley Register, Moreno Valley Butterfield Express and Riverside County News Advertiser. Gill III stated on as publisher for a year until he was promoted to assistant vice president for special projects. He was replaced as general manager at the News by Thomas Woodrow Reeves. In 1991, Gill III was installed as CNPA president. Later that year he was named interim publisher of the Lompoc Record. In 1993, company owner Donald W. Reynolds died. Stephens Group Inc. then acquired the company. In January 1999, Donrey Media Group formed a partnership with MediaNews Group, creating a subsidiary to manage their southern California newspapers.

In July 1999, the California Newspaper Partnership sold the Hemet News and Moreno Valley Times to A.H. Belo Corporation, owner of the Riverside Press-Enterprise. The new owners announced plans to merge the News into the Press-Enterprise and continue it as a local edition. By that time, News circulation had declined to around 12,000 while the Press-Enterprise had a 166,000 circulation. The combined edition of the News and Press-Enterprise was expected to have a 28,000 circulation. The Valley Times had a 3,000 circulation and continued publication. Al McCombs, who had been publisher of the Chino Champion for 44 years, wrote that the News had been "swallowed up" into the Press-Enterprise like similar nearby newspapers which had thereby become "emasculated images of their former selves." In 2024, Gill III died.

== Notable journalism ==
=== Local-ownership ===
On June 1, 1928, the newspaper published an article stating that the cities of Beaumont, Banning, Palm Springs, San Jacinto and Hemet would join to "fight for better telephone service and lower electric light rates," resulting in denial by the Southwestern Home Telephone Company.

The newspaper published yearly special magazine editions to honor the annual Ramona Pageant in Hemet. In 1939, it distributed "one of the biggest weekly newspaper editions in California's history – 76 pages, the largest ever published in Riverside County." Later, the supplement became a 180-page magazine that won national and state awards.

Under the editorship of Homer D. King, the newspaper backed the development of the Hemet Valley Hospital District and the Hemet Farmers Fair.

=== Corporate-ownership ===
==== Scientology ====
The newspaper published a six-part series based on the claims of Ken Rose, who left the Church of Scientology after a membership of 10 years, that the church "runs its international operations from a state-of-the-art media center in this rural community."

The series included comments from church officials, former Scientologists, and analysts. A Hemet News editorial on July 14, said that "as the series unfolded, we had repeated visits from church officials. They were obviously concerned about what would be printed about them[,] and on each occasion our door was open to listen to those concerns."

The editorial said that before the series began "we received a letter from a prominent plaintiff's libel lawyer in New York City threatening us with a lawsuit if we ran certain accusations about the church."

==== Sex scandal ====
On March 18, 1993, the News ran an exclusive story that a Hemet High School football coach and his wife had been arrested for investigation of sexual activity with a minor. The News reported it interviewed four current football players and one former player, none of whose names were published. The school district hired extra guards to prevent news media from entering the high school campus.
