= Tim Hays =

Pulitzer prize-winning editor and publisher

Howard H "Tim" Hays, Jr. (June 2, 1917 – October 14, 2011) was a Pulitzer Prize-winning publisher of the Press-Enterprise in Riverside, California. He was a lifelong advocate for open government and gained national fame for his efforts to defend and define First Amendment rights of the press.

== Biography ==
=== Early life ===
Howard H "Tim" Hays Jr. was born in Chicago on June 2, 1917. His parents, Howard H Hays Sr. and Margaret Mauger Hays, moved Tim and his brothers Dan and William H. Hays with them first to Yellowstone National Park and then Glacier National Park, where his father ran the Red Bus tours. The Hays family eventually moved to Riverside in 1924. He attended Riverside Polytechnic High School, where he showed an early interest in journalism. He was editor of the school newspaper, Poly Spotlight, his senior year. Following his graduation from Riverside Polytechnic, he attended Stanford University, graduating in 1939 with a bachelor of science in social science. He went on to get a law degree from Harvard Law School in 1942.

=== Publishing career ===
During World War II, Hays was a special agent of the FBI. Following the War, Hays left the FBI and briefly worked for the San Bernardino Sun as reporter. He then joined the Press-Enterprise in 1946 as an assistant editor under his father, Howard H. Hays, Sr, who was editor and co-owner of the paper. Tim Hays spent the next 51 years at the Press-Enterprise. Though he never practiced law, Hays took and passed the bar in the same year. Over the years, he rose from assistant editor to editor in 1949, then co-publisher, then publisher, and finally chairman, a role which he held until 1997.

As publisher, Hays took on a number of stories which elicited strong legal opposition from government officials. In 1967, he supervised the publication of a series of more than 100 articles exposing abuse of authority by a judge who served as the conservator for the Agua Caliente Indians in Palm Springs. The judge in question attempted to use his judicial authority to have Hays arrested to end the series of articles. Hays refused to be silenced and successfully avoided being jailed. For these stories the Press-Enterprise received the Pulitzer Prize for Public Service in 1968.

His subsequent efforts to fight restrictions on the freedom of the press that local government officials and judges attempted to impose resulted in the Press-Enterprise taking two open-government cases all the way to the U.S. Supreme Court. The newspaper won both cases. Lawyers working in the area of First Amendment rights routinely refer to the precedents set by these two cases as "Press-Enterprise One" and "Press-Enterprise Two". These cases established the right of the public (and the press) (1) to attend jury selection in criminal trial proceedings and (2) to attend pre-trial hearings in criminal cases with few exceptions in January 1984 and in 1986 respectively.

Hays was on the boards of the American Society of Newspaper Editors, the Pulitzer Prize, and the Associated Press.

Hays stepped down as chairman when the Press-Enterprise was bought by the A.H. Belo Co. from the Hays family. Following the sale of the paper, Hays retired to St. Louis, Missouri. Despite his retirement, he remained active in civic affairs for a number of years.

=== University of California advocacy efforts ===
Hays played an active role in advocating for the establishment of a campus of the University of California in Riverside. The efforts of Hays and his fellow Riverside-area civic leaders lead to the opening of the University of California, Riverside in 1954.

Hays established the Hays Press-Enterprise Lecture at the University of California, Riverside, in 1966. After selling the Press-Enterprise in 1998, he created a $100,000 endowment to sustain the yearly lectures into perpetuity. A few of the keynote speakers who have given lectures since the inception of the series include: retired Washington Post Executive Editor Ben Bradlee; former New York Times managing editor Gene Roberts; CNN president, W. Thomas Johnson.

=== Mission Inn advocacy ===
Hays championed the preservation of the Mission Inn, which he and other civic leaders fought to preserve during a seven-year period when it was shut down and surrounded by a chain link fence. Several attempts to reopen the Mission Inn, a state and national historic monument, ended in failure. There was a threat that the Inn would be demolished and a new municipal parking lot built in its place. Hays and the other civic leaders advocacy ultimately resulted in Duane Roberts, a local businessman, buying the hotel in 1992 and investing millions of dollars to restore and reopen it.

=== Marriage and children ===
Hays' first wife, Helen Hays Yeager, predeceased him by two years to the day. After he and his first wife divorced, Tim Hays married Susan Gudermath Hays. Hays had two sons, Tom Hays, a writer for the Associated Press, and Bill Hays.

=== Death and legacy ===
Hays, who had been suffering from Alzheimer's disease later in life, died at the age of 94 in St. Louis, Missouri. The Press-Enterprise office building was named the Howard H "Tim" Hays Media Center when it was dedicated in 2006.
