= Hemet Academy of Applied Academics and Technology =

Coordinates: 33°44′15″N 116°56′12″W

HAAAT - Hemet Academy of Applied Academics and Technology

Location
- 26400 Dartmouth Street; Hemet, CA, 92544; USA

Information
- Type: Charter high school
- Motto: Experientia Docet
- Established: 2007
- Closed: 2013
- School district: Hemet Unified School District
- Faculty: 11
- Teaching staff: 9
- Grades: 9-12
- Enrollment: 250
- Campus: suburban
- Colors: Neon Green, Bright Blue
- Mascot: Techno Geckos
- Accreditation: Diploma, College Credits
- Website: http://www.hemetusd.k12.ca.us/sites/haaat/index.php

HAAAT - Hemet Academy of Applied Academics and Technology was a high school in Hemet, California. It served 180 students all throughout Hemet, San Jacinto and surrounding areas. The school is operated by the Hemet Unified School District. HAAAT - Hemet Academy of Applied Academics and Technology's mascot is the Gecko. HAAAT was previously located at 26400 Dartmouth St. The school has since been relocated to the former Santa Fe Middle School campus as of summer 2008. Students have been attending here this new campus since the 2008-2009 school year. This campus also hosts other programs, such as MSJC classes, a branch of the Advance Path Academics school, and Helen Hunt Jackson School. HAAAT closed in 2013 and was replaced by College Prep High School.

== Lottery selection process ==
Each year HAAAT advertises a specific registration period. During that time, interested students and parents must return the necessary paperwork, complete an interview and attend an orientation. After the registration period ends, a public random lottery is held to determine which qualified students will attend HAAAT. Everyone meeting the enrollment deadline and criteria is placed into the lottery pool. Two lottery sections are to be held the same night - one for ninth grade and one for tenth grade. One new grade will be added in the 2008–09 and 2009-10.

The first 125 names chosen are eligible for HAAAT enrollment. The remaining names are drawn to determine the waiting list order. Siblings of students chosen to attend are moved to the top of the waiting list.

== Class durations and time ==
1st, 2nd, and 3rd periods at HAAAT are 89 minutes long. 4th period is 30 minutes long, and 5th period is 59 minutes long (for some classes, 4th and 5th period is combined to create another 89 minute class). This has allowed for all "year-long" classes to be shortened to 18 weeks, and "semester-long" classes to be shortened to 9 weeks. Classes 18 weeks duration and 89 minutes long award 10 credits. Classes 18 weeks duration and 30–60 minutes long award 5 credits. Classes 9 weeks duration, and 89 minutes long award 5 credits. "0" Period classes taken on other high school campuses award credits based on that school's own discretion.

== Class sizes ==
Most core-subject class sizes have an average 25:1 Student/Teacher ratio. No classes are larger than this, with the exception of the Physical Education program. The PE class usually counters a 39:1 Student/Teacher ratio. Electives have an average 20:1 Student/Teacher Ratio. For the second semester's classes, however, the Student/Teacher ratio for nearly all of the classes went up to about 32:1 (approximately). This was because the school had no money and because they get no money from the state, teacher's hours had to be cut and students in other periods were moved to different periods of the same class, greatly increasing class size.

== Technology element ==
Students use laptop and desktop computers to complete in-school projects and presentations. They use projectors to present their work, and flash drives to save it. Cell phones are not to be used during class, but they are allowed on campus along with iPods, MP3 players, students' personal laptop computers, and flash drives. 1 gig or higher flash drives (aka thumb drives, zip drives, USB drives, etc.) are highly encouraged for students to save work. Each student also holds a profile on the school's LAN "F" drive to save work on, and can access a public "S" drive for sharing files with other computer profiles. Internet is used by students on a multi-daily basis, though it has become less resourceful due to district restrictions.

== Project-based learning ==
Most of the teaching done at HAAAT is done by the students themselves. They work in groups consisting of on average 2-4 people, sharing work equally. They use resources such as internet, PowerPoint presentations and videos to learn, instead of a teacher standing up in front of the room doing a lecture every day. Students learn to rely on each other and the school has a generally more personal atmosphere due to students working closely with each other. Of course, traditional learning methods are used occasionally, but the teachers prefer to use more interactive methods to include the students, and get them more interested in learning.

== Textbooks ==
While textbooks are issued to students, they were not used quite as often as in traditional schools. This was caused by both a shortage on funding, and other resources phasing them out. Students still studied the state's/district's curriculum, but in more advanced and interesting ways. This has turned out to be successful for students, as they retain information better with these innovative methods, and do better on tests. However, due to the fear of falling test scores, the administrators have encouraged their teachers to stick to using textbooks more often than the successful alternative methods.

== Student advantages ==
Along with earning a diploma at a faster pace, students have options to take online classes, "0" Periods, college classes, and a comprehensive career exploration program. Also, students are allowed to participate in sports for other schools in and around the HUSD

== Community service ==
Students at HAAAT must complete 15 hours of community service each semester. They will complete 30 hours over the course of a school year. Hours must be earned beyond the school day, and supervisors have to sign off hours earned.

== Career exploration program ==
The career exploration program is a class taken throughout the student's duration at HAAAT. It focuses on teaching how to complete different types of resumes, help the students how to find their main career interests, prepare them for job interviews, and also colleges. All of the teachers teach a short half hour version of this class during 4th period, while a specialized teacher, or counselor teaches an extended version for an hour and a half to a small number of students enrolled in it. It is the goal of the school to have all students take both the extended, and shorter versions of the class for better retention of the classes' curriculum.

== Online parent updates ==
All students are registered on an online grade update program called Edline. From there, parents can access up to date grades, test scores, project grades, and absence reports for all their student's classes. Students can also benefit from using Edline, because they can look up assignments from home, as well as explore extra credit opportunities.

== Test scores ==
In 2007-2008, 90% of Sophomores at HAAAT passed the CAHSEE. All scores overall for HAAAT were better than the district expected for the school's launch year.

== Clubs ==
On March 8, 2010, an awareness club, called We Spread The Word (WSTW), was initiated at HAAAT. This awareness club specializes in teaching elementary age children about the dangers of drugs, obesity, alcohol, smoking and bullying. It also tries to teach them the importance of a good education. They are planning to take trips to the different Elementary Schools throughout the Hemet Unified School District to teach the children. The officers and members plan upon expanding as time goes on, especially in the 2010-2011 school year.
