= Santa Rosa Hills (Riverside County) =

Mountain range in Riverside County, California, US

- Santa Rosa Hills viewed from Simpson Park, Hemet, California

Highest point
- Elevation: 2,333 ft (711 m)

Geography
- Location within California
- Country: United States
- State: California
- Region: Peninsular Ranges
- District: Riverside County
- Range coordinates: 33°42′17.079″N 116°55′49.084″W
- Topo map: USGS Hemet

The Santa Rosa Hills are a low mountain range in the northern Peninsular Ranges System, in Riverside County, California.

They are located southeast of Hemet.
