= The Press-Enterprise =

Newspaper in Riverside, California

- The July 27, 2005 front page of The Press-Enterprise
- Type: Daily newspaper
- Format: Broadsheet
- Owner(s): Southern California News Group (MediaNews Group)
- Founder: James H. Roe
- Publisher: Ron Hasse
- Editor: Frank Pine
- Founded: 1878
- Language: English
- Headquarters: 1825 Chicago Ave, Suite 100; Riverside, California 92507, United States
- Circulation: 2011; 92,697 Daily; 114,405 Sunday 2009 Ranked 65 of 100; 149,608 Daily; 160,016 Sunday 2008 Ranked 63 of 100; 164,189 Daily; 172,730 Sunday 2007 Ranked 60 of 100; 172,593 Daily; 178,062 Sunday
- Sister newspapers: La Prensa (Spanish-language weekly)
- ISSN: 0746-4258
- Website: pressenterprise.com

The Press-Enterprise is a paid daily newspaper published by Digital First Media that serves the Inland Empire in Southern California. Headquartered in downtown Riverside, California, it is the primary newspaper for the Riverside County portion of the Inland Empire, with heavy penetration into neighboring San Bernardino County. The geographic circulation area of the newspaper spans from the border of Orange County to the west, east to the Coachella Valley, north to the San Bernardino Mountains, and south to the San Diego County line. The Press-Enterprise is a member of the Southern California News Group.

== History ==
=== Riverside Press ===
The Riverside Press was first published on June 29, 1878, by James H. Roe, a druggist and teacher. The weekly paper began with 500 subscribers. In 1880, Roe sold the newspaper for $1,300 to Luther M. Holt, who renamed it to the Riverside Press and Horticulturist. He expanded it into a tri-weekly in 1885, and a year later began issuing the paper daily.

Holt sold the Press in 1888 to J.W. Tibbot for $20,000, who soon resold it later that year to Roe, Reverdy J. Pierson and E.W. Holmes. Roe retired a year later. Pierson died in May 1894. A year later his estate sold his half-interest to the Clarke Bros., former owners of the Ontario Record. Holmes also sold out at that time. E.P. Clarke became editor-in-chief and A.F. Clarke became city editor.

The paper was operated by the Press Publishing Company. Around 1930, the Sun Publishing Company, publisher of the San Bernardino Sun purchased a half-interest in the business.

=== Riverside Enterprise ===
The Riverside Daily Enterprise was first published in December 1885 by David F. Sarber. Sarber retired in August 1886 and was succeeded by J.A. Studabecker. In April 1890, George A. Faylor relocated the Paso Pobles Moon to Riverside and bought and absorbed the Enterprise. The Riverside Moon ceased after a few weeks.

In June 1890, Mark R. Plaisted revived the Enterprise. It became a county paper in 1896 when it absorbed the Perris Valley Record and the Moreno Valley Indicator. Plaisted sold the paper in April 1899 to H.H. Monroe and Clarence W. Barton. At some point Monroe left and the paper was renamed to the Mission.

In March 1910, Barton sold the Riverside Morning Mission to the Milnes Brothers. A month later Edgar Johnson, publisher of the Orange County Tribune, bought the paper and renamed it back to the Riverside Enterprise. He sold the paper in October 1911 to Monroe. Around January 1912, the Enterprise came under the ownership of Frederick O'Brien. In October, O'Brien sold the Enterprise to John Raymond "Ray" Gabbert and purchased his ownership stake in the Oxnard Courier. Gabbert sold a half-interest in the paper to Will H. Marsh in January 1927.

=== Press-Enterprise ===
In 1931, Ray Gabbert sold his half-interest in the Riverside Enterprise to the Sun Publishing Company, which co-owned the Riverside Press and published San Bernardino Sun. Howard H. Hays bought in as a stockholder and was named president of the Enterprise. The newly combined company issued The Enterprise in the morning, and The Press in the evenings. In 1954, the Riverside Press changed its company name to the Press-Enterprise Company, and in 1955 the two papers began printing a joint Sunday edition called the Sunday Press-Enterprise. Due to market conditions, the two papers were combined into one morning paper, The Press-Enterprise, in 1983.

In 1981, the Culver family sold their minority stake in The Press-Enterprise to the Dow Jones & Company. At that time the paper had a circulation of 170,000. A.H. Belo Corporation, owner of the Dallas Morning News, purchased that 21.% interest in 1996, and then bought out the Hays family a year later, resulting in A.H. Belo Co. acquiring 98% control of the Press-Enterprise Co. In 1999, the Hemet News was acquired and merged into the paper. In 2011, former owner Hays died, and a year later he was posthumously inducted into the California Newspaper Hall of Fame.

In 2013, The Press-Enterprise was sold to Freedom Communications, owner of the Orange County Register, for $27 million. Heavy layoffs were announced a few months later. On November 1, 2015, Freedom Communications filed for Chapter 11 Bankruptcy protection. On March 21, 2016, the Press-Enterprise and O.C. Register were sold at auction to Digital First Media. Due to media consolidation and the high cost of running printing presses, The Press-Enterprise prints all newspapers for SCNG, as well as the Los Angeles Times and regional editions of The New York Times and The Wall Street Journal.

In 2025, University of California, Riverside acquired access to the paper's entire archive which was digitized by NewsBank and made it available to the public.

== Pulitzer Prize ==
The Press-Enterprise won the 1968 Pulitzer Prize for meritorious public service for its exposé of corruption in the courts in connection with the handling of the property and estates of the Agua Caliente Indian tribe of Palm Springs, California. The series was written by George Ringwald.

== Supreme Court cases ==
The Press-Enterprise Company won two separate United States Supreme Court cases that established the public's right to witness specific aspects of criminal court proceedings.

The first case, won in 1984, was Press-Enterprise Co. v. Superior Court of California, Riverside County. In a case involving the rape and murder of a teenage girl, the Press-Enterprise requested that the voir dire, the process of questioning the jury, be open to the public and press. The request was denied, as well as the request for the subsequent transcripts, and upheld by the California Court of Appeal. The California Supreme Court denied the Press-Enterprise's request for a hearing. The United States Supreme Court decided in favor of the Press-Enterprise, establishing that the public has the right to attend jury selection during criminal trials.

The second case, won in 1986, was also called Press-Enterprise Co. v. Superior Court of California. The case involved Robert Diaz who was accused of 12 patient murders while acting as a nurse at the Community Hospital of the Valleys in Perris, California. The defendant requested that the public be excluded from the proceedings. The Magistrate granted the unopposed request because of the national attention the case had garnered. At the end of the hearing the Press-Enterprise requested that the transcripts be released, but the request was denied and the records were sealed. The United States Supreme Court decided that the public has the right to attend pretrial hearings in criminal cases, including preliminary hearings.

== See also ==
- Tim Hays
- James Ward
