= Hemet, California =

City in California, United States

- City
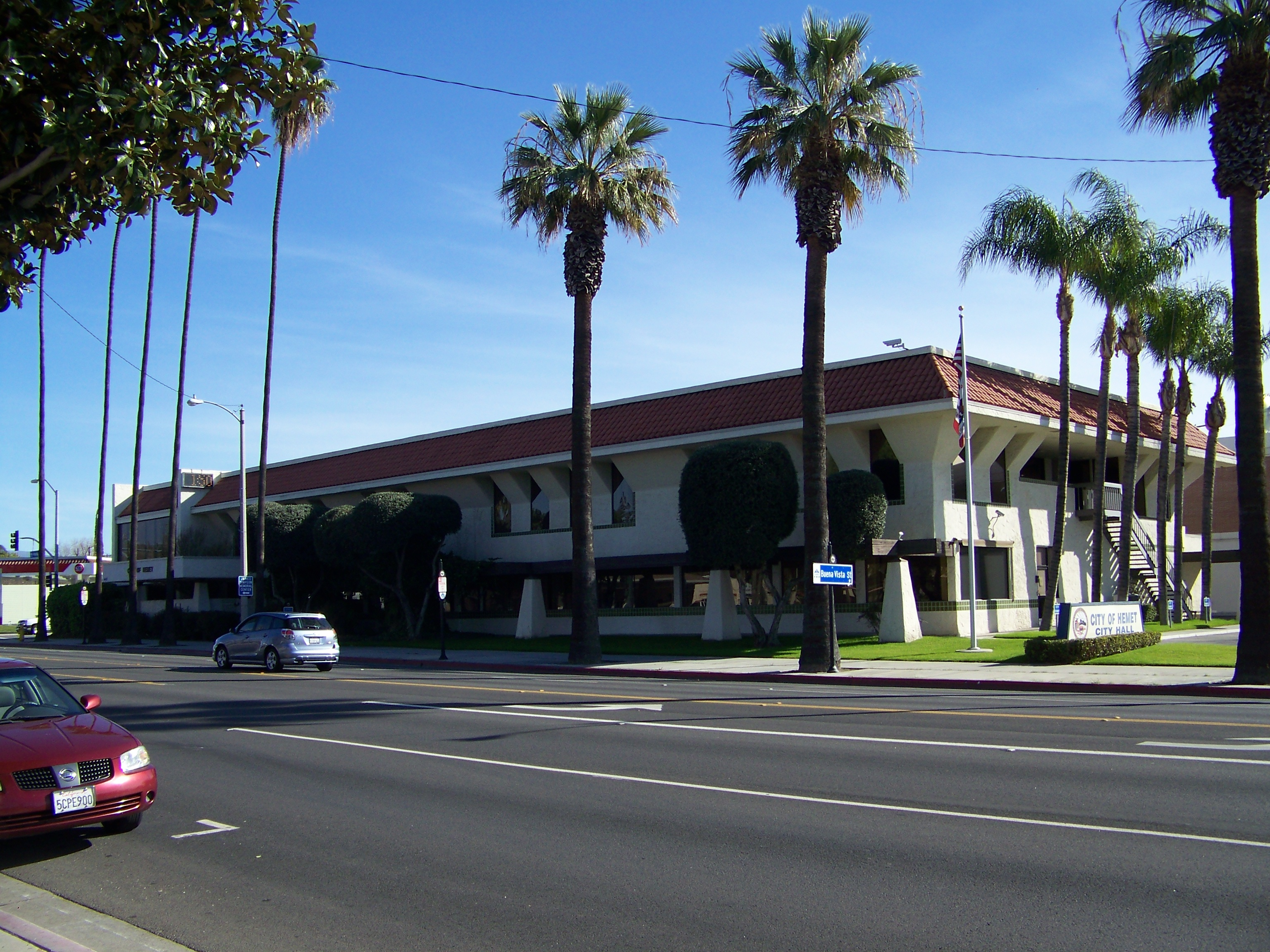
- City Hall

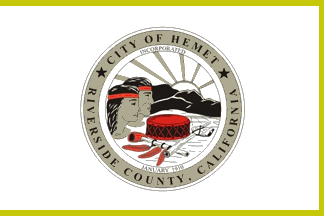
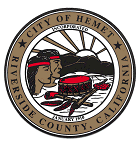
- Flag Seal
- Interactive map of Hemet, California
- Location in the United States Hemet (the United States)
- Coordinates: 33°44′51″N 116°58′19″W
- Country: United States
- State: California
- County: Riverside
- Established: January 20, 1910
- Named for: Lake Hemet Land Company

Government
  - Type: Council-Manager
  - Mayor: Linda Krupa
  - Mayor Pro Tem: Joe Males
  - City Council: Connie Howard-Clark; Tom Lodge; Jackie Peterson
  - City Treasurer: Dale Dieleman

Area
  - Total: 29.28 sq mi (75.84 km^{2})
  - Land: 29.28 sq mi (75.84 km^{2})
  - Water: 0 sq mi (0.00 km^{2}) 0%
- Elevation: 1,594 ft (486 m)

Population (2020)
  - Total: 89,833
  - Rank: 84th in California
  - Density: 3,068/sq mi (1,185/km^{2})
- Time zone: UTC−8 (Pacific)
  - Summer (DST): UTC−7 (PDT)
- ZIP Codes: 92543–92546
- Area code: 951
- FIPS code: 06-33182
- GNIS feature IDs: 1652718, 2410738
- Website: www.hemetca.gov

Hemet is a city in the San Jacinto Valley in Riverside County, California, United States. It covers a total area of 29.3 square miles (76 km^{2}), about half of the valley, which it shares with the neighboring city of San Jacinto. The population was 89,833 at the 2020 census. It borders San Jacinto to the north, East Hemet to the east, Polly Butte and Diamond Valley Lake to the south, and Green Acres to the west.

The founding of Hemet predates the formation of Riverside County. This area was then still part of San Diego County. The formation of Lake Hemet helped the city to grow and stimulated agriculture in the area.

The city is known for being the home of The Ramona Pageant, California's official outdoor play. Started in 1923, the play is one of the longest-running outdoor plays in the United States.

Hemet has been named a Tree City USA for 20 years by the Arbor Day Foundation for its dedication to the local forest. The city is home to the Hemet Valley Medical Center, a 320-bed general hospital.

== Etymology ==
Hemet was named by the land development company that founded the town, The Lake Hemet Land Company. The company drew its name from Hemet Valley, now called Garner Valley, located in the San Jacinto Mountains. Initially, the company referred to the area as South San Jacinto, but changed the name to Hemet when the land company filed a plat map on November 11, 1893.

== History ==
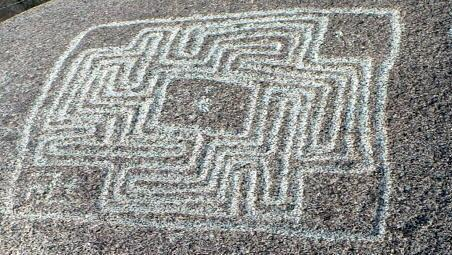
The Hemet Maze Stone, 2012

This had long been the territory of the indigenous Soboba people and Cahuilla tribe prior to Spanish colonization. During the early 19th century, Mission San Luis Rey used the land for cattle ranching. The area was known as Rancho San Jacinto.

=== Mexican period ===
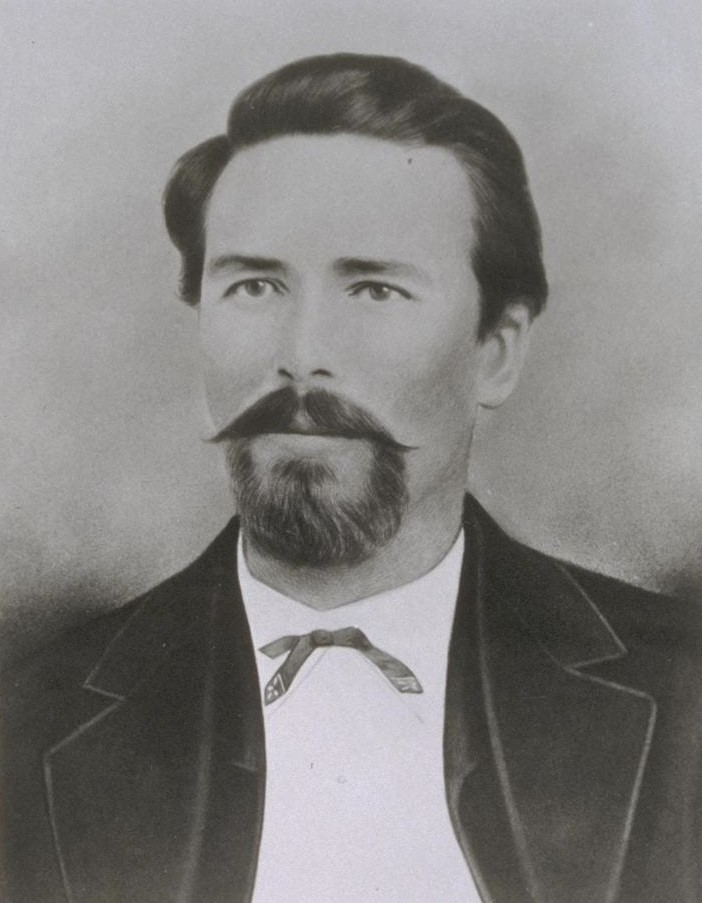
Hemet was part of Rancho San Jacinto Viejo, granted in 1842 to Californio politician Don José Antonio Estudillo.

Following Mexico gaining independence from Spain, in 1842, settler José Antonio Estudillo received the Rancho San Jacinto Viejo Mexican land grant.

In 1848, the United States annexed the California territory after defeating Mexico in the Mexican–American War. In 1887, during the first major Southern California land boom, Anglo-Americans W.F. Whittier and E.L. Mayberry founded the Lake Hemet Water Company, and the Lake Hemet Land Company, for speculative development. They had plans to dam the San Jacinto River to provide irrigation water to the valley. They named the town Hemet in November 1893.

In 1895, they completed Hemet Dam as a private project on the San Jacinto River, creating Lake Hemet and providing a reliable water supply to the San Jacinto Valley. This water system, for irrigation in an arid region, was integral to the valley's development as an agricultural area.

By 1894, settlers had established a newspaper, the Hemet News, and "several general stores", the largest being Heffelfinger & Co, which occupied an entire block. Other businesses included "a drug store, an excellent barber shop, two blacksmith shops, harness shop, shoe repairing houses, two real estate offices and two lumber yards." "The most pretentious building" was the two-story Hotel Mayberry, "supplied with all the modern conveniences usually found in first-class hostelries, including stationary water, baths, etc., and a complete electric light system, the power for which is furnished by the company's private plant." Also noted was the Hemet flour mill, owned by John McCool and built at a cost of $20,000. It was the only such mill in this area, and was housed in a brick building. It could produce 50 barrels of flour per day.

=== Incorporation ===
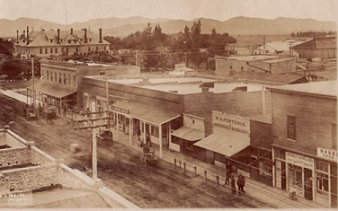
Harvard Street c. 1907, Hemet Hotel in background

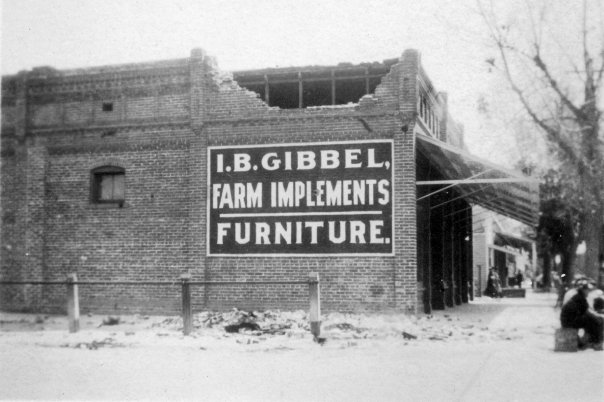
Gibbel Hardware following the 1918 San Jacinto earthquake

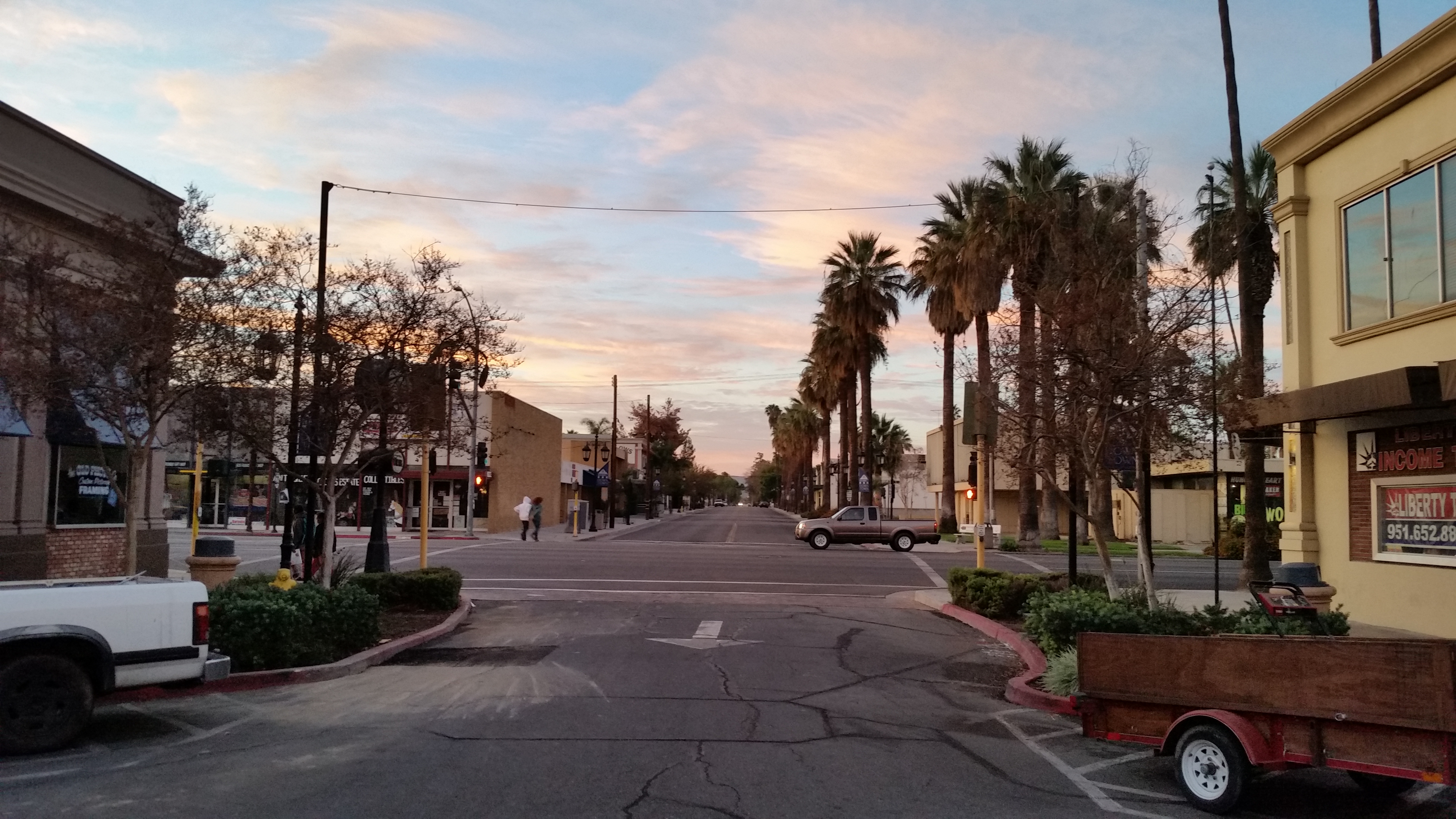
Sunrise over Downtown Hemet, south down Harvard Street, 2014

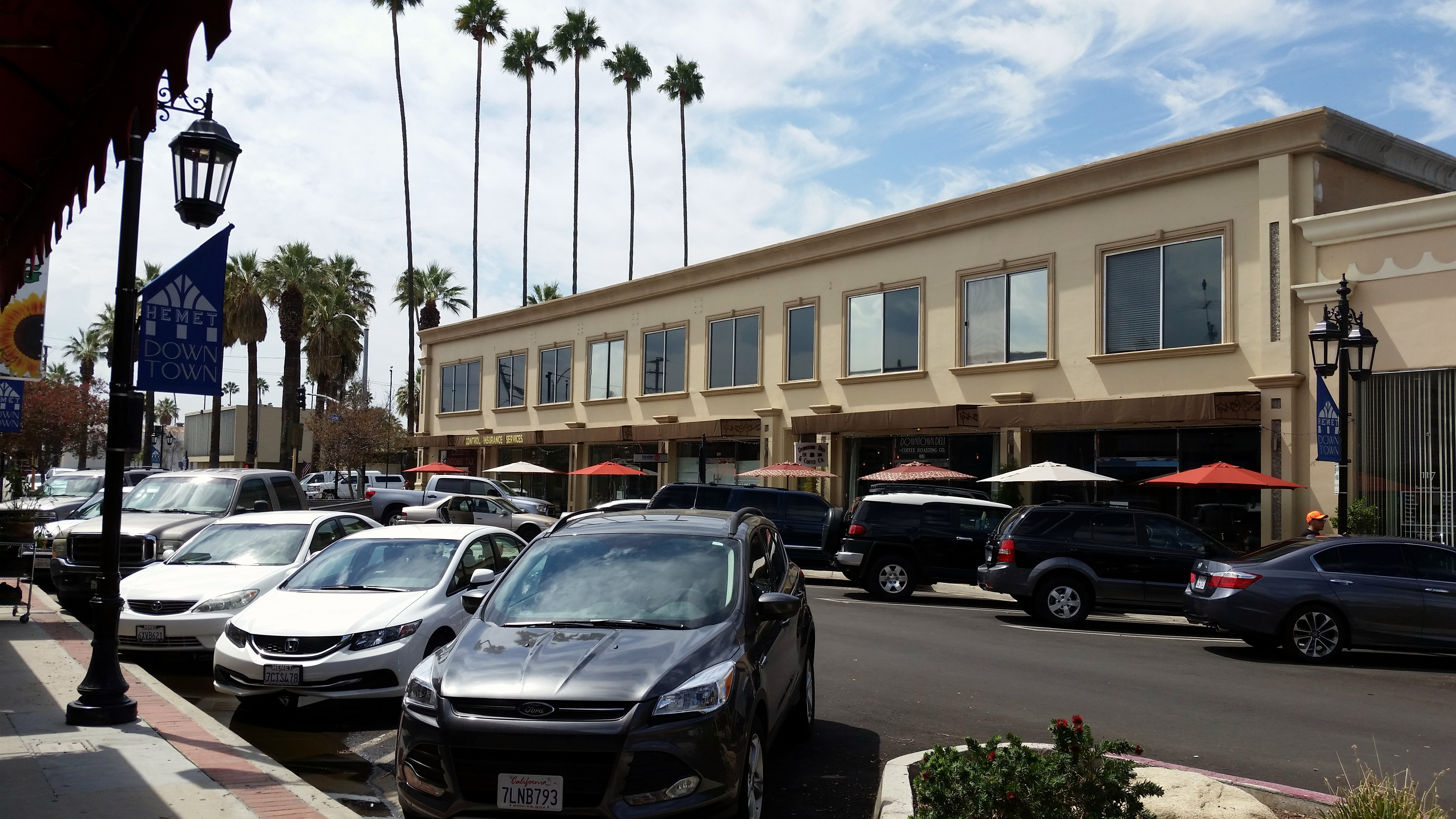
Downtown Hemet, south down North Harvard Street, 2015

Hemet was incorporated in January 1910. Of 177 residents, 130 voted to incorporate, with 33 against. Those who voted against incorporation were landowners who feared increased taxation. The incorporation helped to serve the growing city, which was outgrowing its current infrastructure.

With a railroad spur running from Riverside, the city became a trading center for San Jacinto Valley agriculture; commodity crops included citrus, apricots, peaches, olives, and walnuts. The Agricultural District Farmer's Fair of Riverside County began here in 1936 as the Hemet Turkey Show. It was relocated to Perris.

During World War II, the city hosted the Ryan School of Aeronautics, which trained about 6,000 fliers for the Army Air Force between 1940 and 1944. The site of the flight school was redeveloped as Hemet-Ryan Airport. In 1950, Hemet was home to 10,000 people, joining Corona and Riverside as the three largest cities in Riverside County.

Hemet was racially discriminatory. Numerous African Americans migrated to California during and after World War II in the Great Migration from such Deep South states as Mississippi, Louisiana, and Texas. Hemet was a sundown town, prohibiting African Americans from living there or even staying overnight.

In the 1960s, large-scale residential development began, mostly in the form of mobile home parks and retirement communities. Hemet was known as a working-class retirement area. In the 1980s, former ranchland was developed in subdivisions of single-family homes. "Big-box" retail followed the increase in population. After a roughly decade-long lull in development following the major economic downturn of the early 1990s, housing starts in the city skyrocketed in the early 21st century. The area's affordability, its proximity to employment centers such as Corona, Riverside and San Bernardino, and its relatively rural character made it an attractive location for working-class families priced out of other areas of Southern California.

== Geography ==
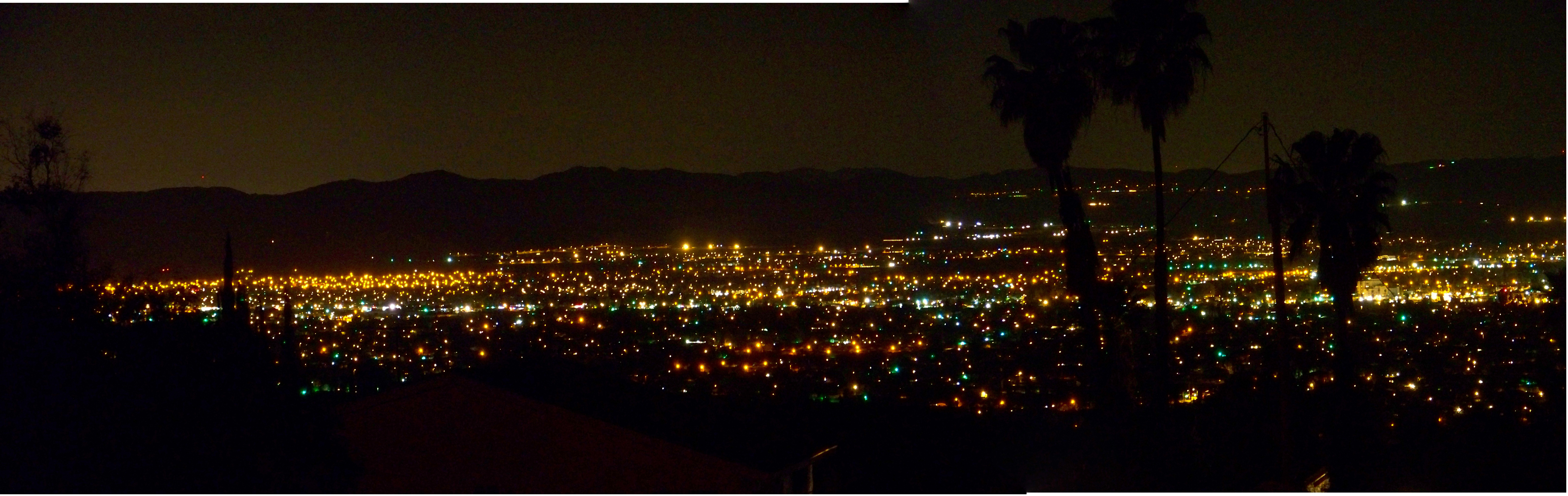
Hemet panorama at night from the entrance of Simpson Park

Hemet is in the San Jacinto Valley of western Riverside County, south of San Jacinto. The valley, surrounded by the Santa Rosa Hills and San Jacinto Mountains, is mostly dry land, except for Diamond Valley Lake to the south. According to the United States Census Bureau, the city has a total area of 29.28 square miles (76 km^{2}), all land.

Hemet is 80 miles (130 km) southeast of Downtown Los Angeles.

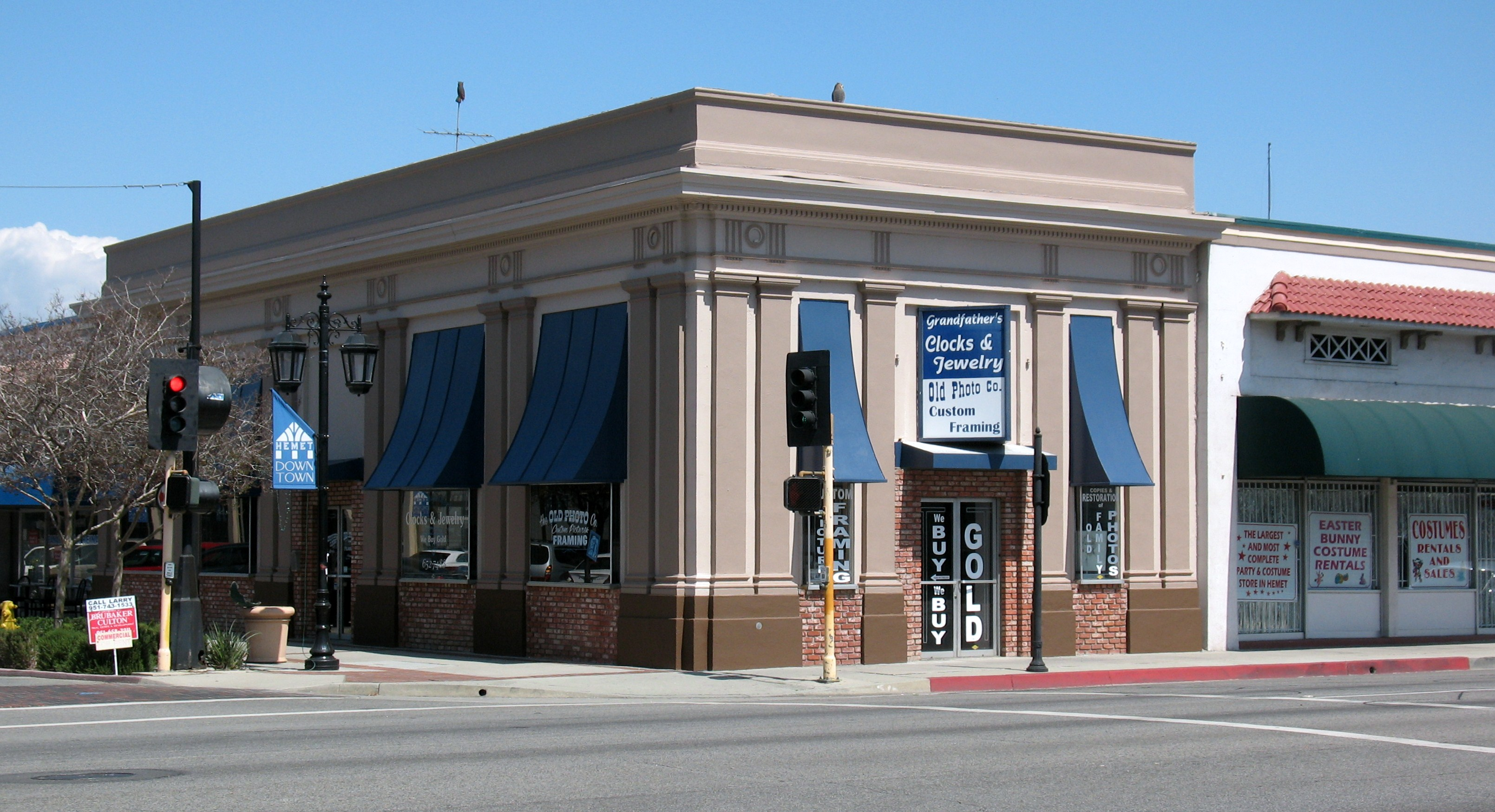
NE Corner of Harvard Street and Florida Avenue

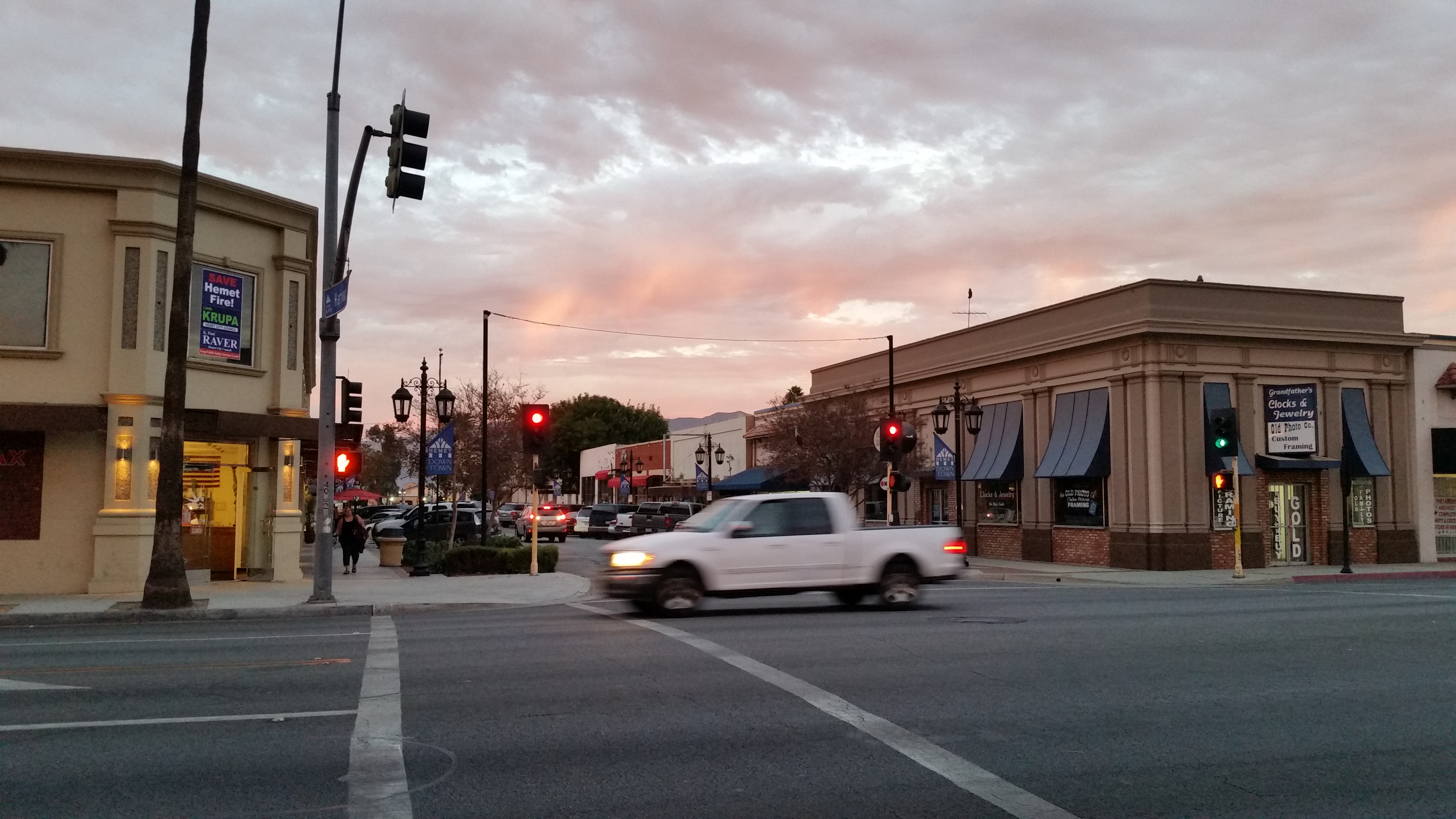
Harvard District - Downtown Hemet in 2014

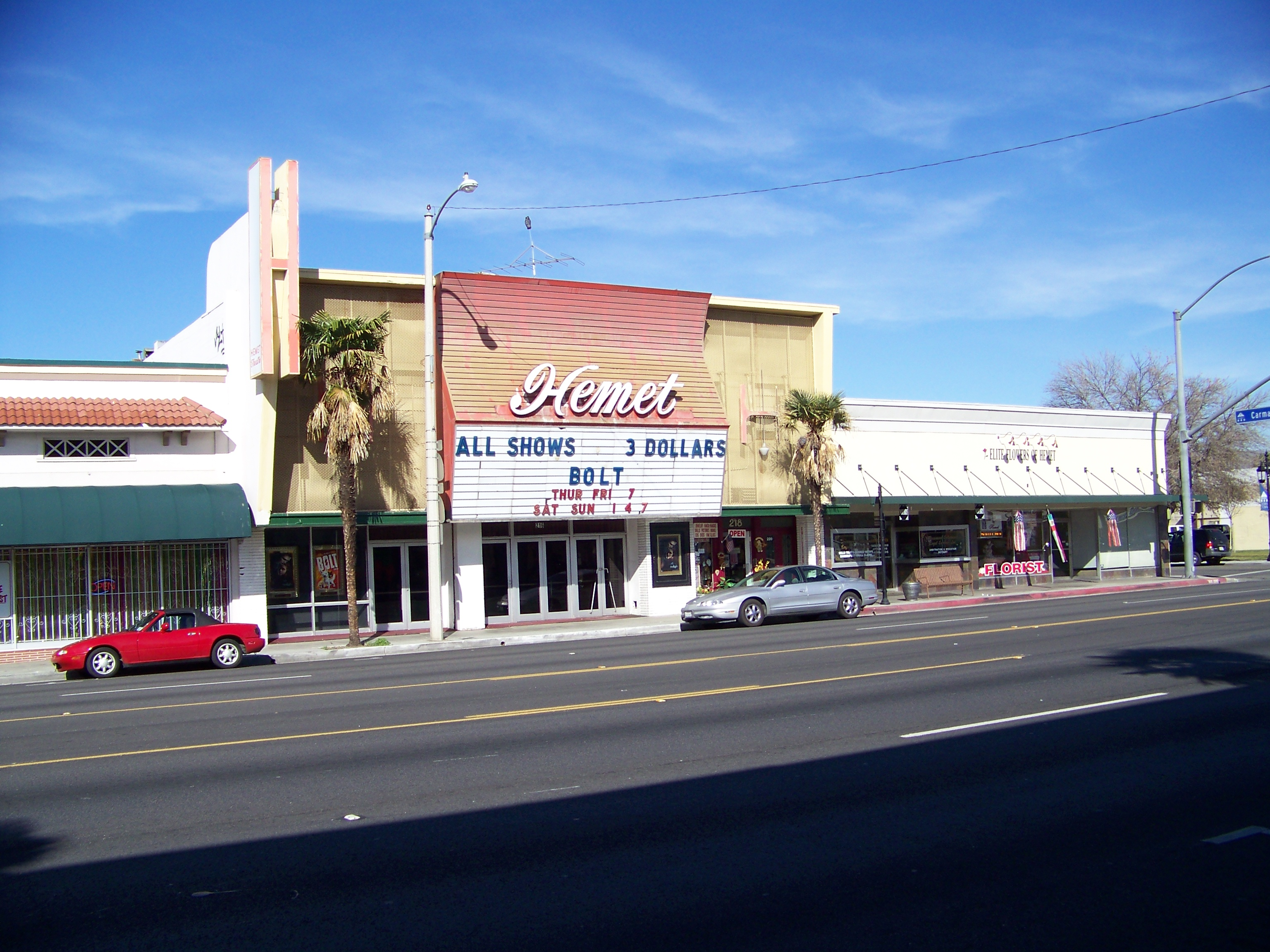
Hemet Theater in downtown, built in 1921

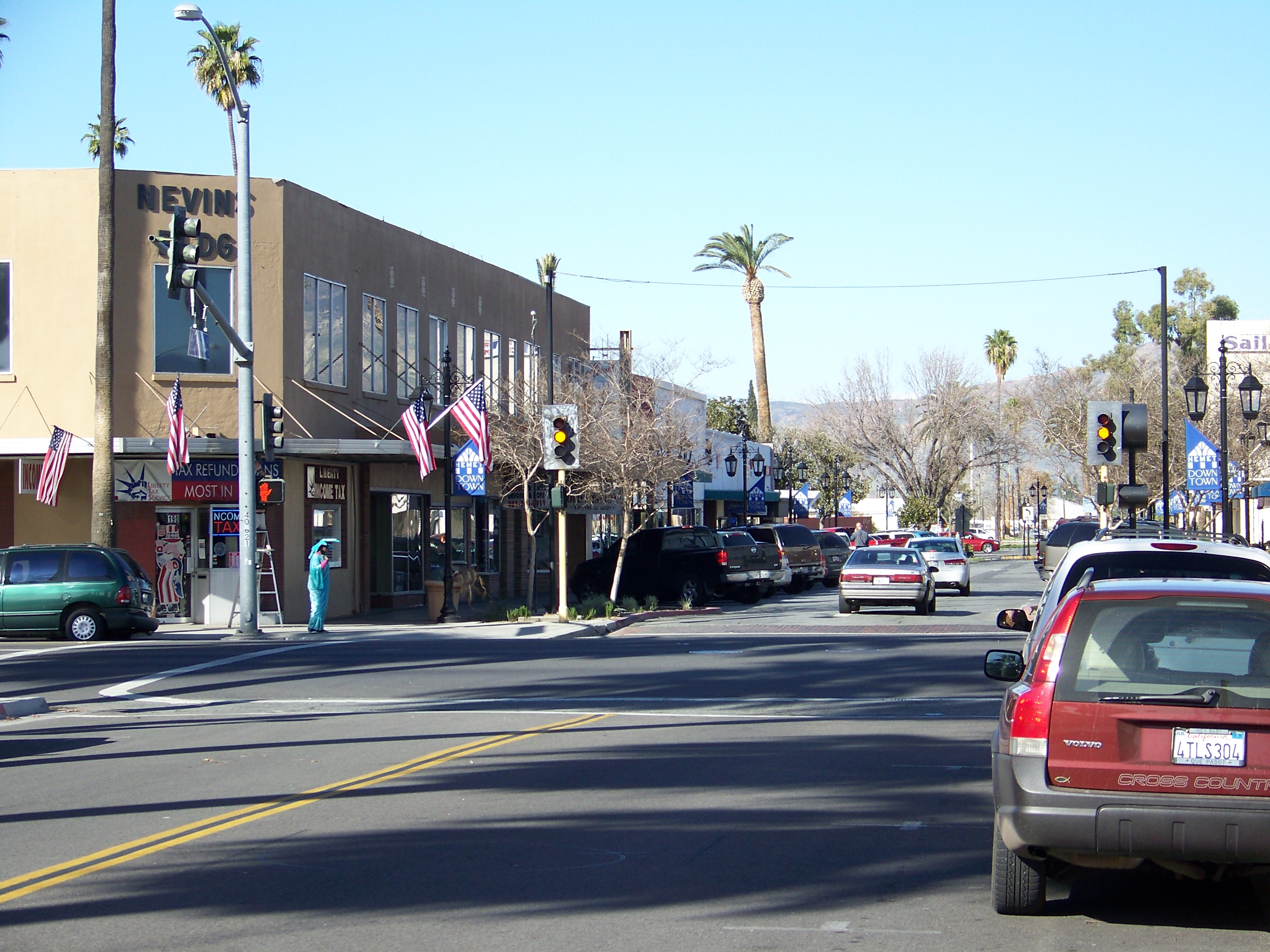
Harvard Street, looking north in 2008

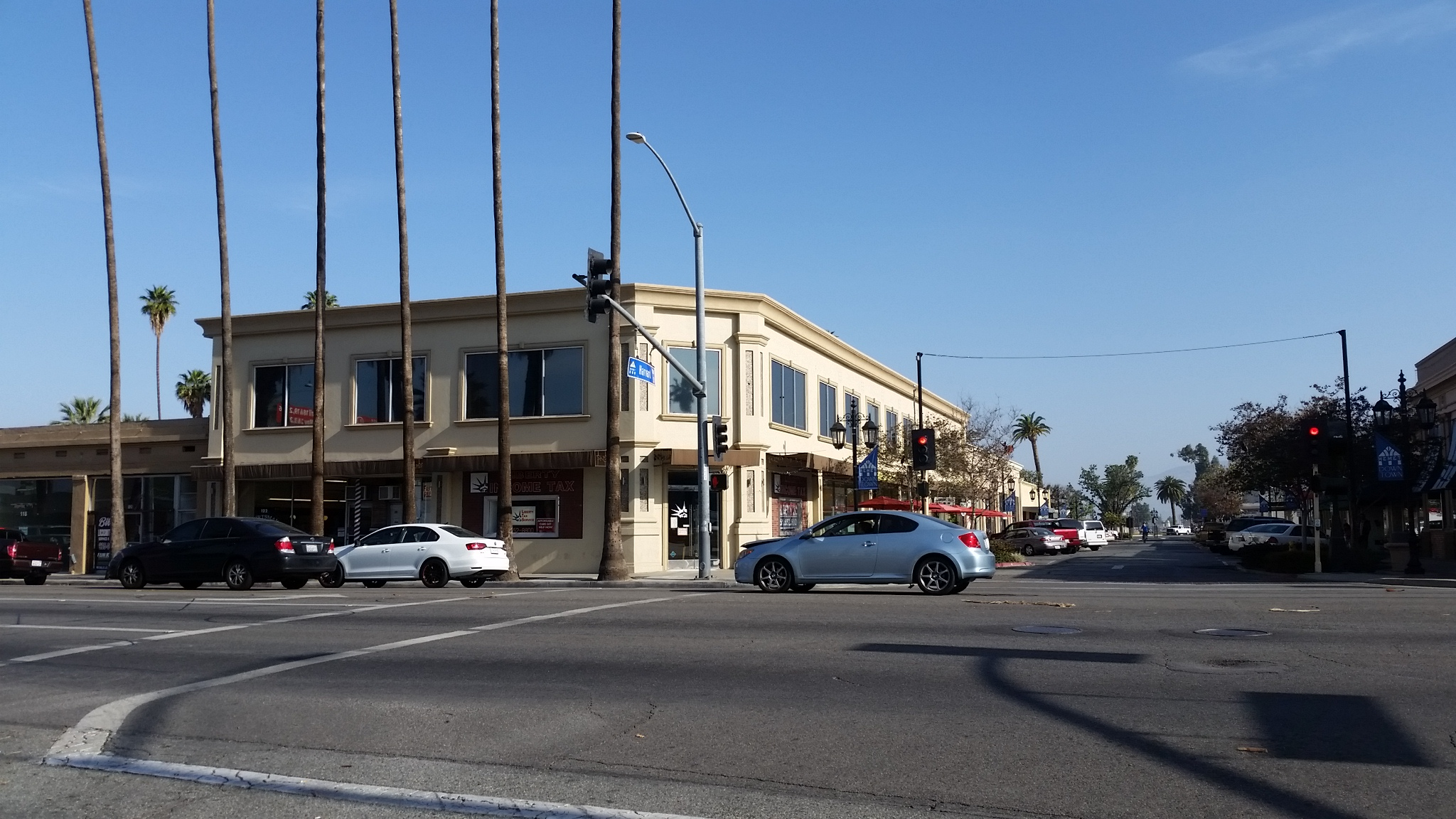
Downtown Hemet, looking north down Harvard Street

=== Climate ===
Hemet has a semi-arid climate (Köppen climate classification: BSh) with mild winters and very hot, very dry summers.

Climate data for Hemet, California (1991–2020 normals, extremes 1917–18, 1997–present)
Month	Jan	Feb	Mar	Apr	May	Jun	Jul	Aug	Sep	Oct	Nov	Dec	Year
Record high °F (°C)	90 (32)	89 (32)	96 (36)	100 (38)	109 (43)	114 (46)	115 (46)	116 (47)	113 (45)	105 (41)	99 (37)	87 (31)	116 (47)
Mean maximum °F (°C)	81.5 (27.5)	81.8 (27.7)	87.3 (30.7)	93.8 (34.3)	98.5 (36.9)	103.8 (39.9)	107.7 (42.1)	108.6 (42.6)	106.1 (41.2)	97.9 (36.6)	90.0 (32.2)	81.1 (27.3)	110.6 (43.7)
Mean daily maximum °F (°C)	66.3 (19.1)	66.5 (19.2)	70.7 (21.5)	75.4 (24.1)	80.8 (27.1)	89.1 (31.7)	95.6 (35.3)	96.7 (35.9)	92.2 (33.4)	82.4 (28.0)	73.2 (22.9)	65.2 (18.4)	79.5 (26.4)
Daily mean °F (°C)	55.2 (12.9)	56.2 (13.4)	59.0 (15.0)	62.4 (16.9)	67.6 (19.8)	72.6 (22.6)	80.2 (26.8)	81.1 (27.3)	77.2 (25.1)	68.8 (20.4)	60.9 (16.1)	54.1 (12.3)	66.3 (19.1)
Mean daily minimum °F (°C)	44.2 (6.8)	46.0 (7.8)	47.3 (8.5)	49.5 (9.7)	54.4 (12.4)	56.0 (13.3)	64.7 (18.2)	65.6 (18.7)	62.1 (16.7)	55.3 (12.9)	48.7 (9.3)	43.1 (6.2)	53.1 (11.7)
Mean minimum °F (°C)	30.7 (−0.7)	31.2 (−0.4)	34.3 (1.3)	36.5 (2.5)	42.4 (5.8)	47.0 (8.3)	52.3 (11.3)	52.6 (11.4)	49.0 (9.4)	43.5 (6.4)	34.8 (1.6)	29.7 (−1.3)	27.5 (−2.5)
Record low °F (°C)	23 (−5)	23 (−5)	27 (−3)	28 (−2)	38 (3)	40 (4)	44 (7)	46 (8)	41 (5)	34 (1)	23 (−5)	21 (−6)	21 (−6)
Average precipitation inches (mm)	2.40 (61)	2.80 (71)	1.62 (41)	0.74 (19)	0.44 (11)	0.05 (1.3)	0.19 (4.8)	0.19 (4.8)	0.37 (9.4)	0.51 (13)	0.73 (19)	1.71 (43)	11.75 (298)
Average precipitation days (≥ 0.01 in.)	5.9	6.0	4.4	3.0	1.9	0.3	0.8	0.8	0.9	1.7	2.8	4.5	33
Source: NOAA

== Demographics ==
Historical population
Census	Pop.	Note	%±
1910	992		—
1920	1,480		49.2%
1930	2,235		51.0%
1940	2,595		16.1%
1950	3,386		30.5%
1960	5,416		60.0%
1970	12,252		126.2%
1980	22,531		83.9%
1990	36,094		60.2%
2000	58,812		62.9%
2010	78,657		33.7%
2020	89,833		14.2%
U.S. Decennial Census

=== Racial and ethnic composition ===
Hemet city, California – Racial and ethnic composition Note: the US Census treats Hispanic/Latino as an ethnic category. This table excludes Latinos from the racial categories and assigns them to a separate category. Hispanics/Latinos may be of any race.
Race / Ethnicity (NH = Non-Hispanic)	Pop 1980	Pop 1990	Pop 2000	Pop 2010	Pop 2020	% 1980	% 1990	% 2000	% 2010	% 2020
White alone (NH)	20,473	29,833	41,345	40,723	33,051	91.18%	82.65%	70.30%	51.77%	36.79%
Black or African American alone (NH)	27	226	1,407	4,711	8,285	0.12%	0.63%	2.39%	5.99%	9.22%
Native American or Alaska Native alone (NH)	152	227	447	549	537	0.68%	0.63%	0.76%	0.70%	0.60%
Asian alone (NH)	114	390	842	2,197	2,914	0.51%	1.08%	1.43%	2.79%	3.24%
Native Hawaiian or Pacific Islander alone (NH)	114	390	64	239	345	0.51%	1.08%	0.11%	0.30%	0.38%
Other race alone (NH)	15	35	48	91	423	0.07%	0.10%	0.08%	0.12%	0.47%
Mixed race or Multiracial (NH)	x	x	1,074	1,997	3,482	x	x	1.83%	2.54%	3.88%
Hispanic or Latino (any race)	1,673	5,383	13,585	28,150	40,796	7.45%	14.91%	23.10%	35.79%	45.41%
Total	22,454	36,094	58,812	78,657	89,833	100.00%	100.00%	100.00%	100.00%	100.00%

=== 2023 estimate ===
In 2023, the US Census Bureau estimated that the median household income was $53,623, and the per capita income was $28,255. About 12.8% of families and 16.0% of the population were below the poverty line.

=== 2020 census ===
As of the 2020 census, Hemet had a population of 89,833 and a population density of 3,067.9 inhabitants per square mile (1,184.5/km^{2}). The racial makeup of Hemet was 41,311 (46.0%) White, 8,767 (9.8%) Black or African American, 1,759 (2.0%) American Indian and Alaska Native, 3,116 (3.5%) Asian, 406 (0.5%) Native Hawaiian and Other Pacific Islander, 20,785 (23.1%) from other races, and 13,689 (15.2%) from two or more races. Hispanic or Latino residents of any race were 40,796 (45.4%) of the population.

98.2% of residents lived in urban areas, while 1.8% lived in rural areas.

The census reported that 98.8% of the population lived in households, 0.3% lived in non-institutionalized group quarters, and 0.9% were institutionalized. There were 33,027 households, out of which 30.6% had children under the age of 18 living in them. Of all households, 40.6% were married-couple households, 7.2% were cohabiting couple households, 33.3% had a female householder with no spouse or partner present, and 18.9% had a male householder with no spouse or partner present. About 28.5% of all households were made up of individuals, and 18.2% had someone living alone who was 65 years of age or older. The average household size was 2.69. There were 21,583 families (65.3% of all households).

The age distribution was 23.8% under the age of 18, 8.2% aged 18 to 24, 22.7% aged 25 to 44, 22.6% aged 45 to 64, and 22.8% who were 65 years of age or older. The median age was 40.3 years. For every 100 females, there were 91.1 males, and for every 100 females age 18 and over there were 87.1 males.

There were 35,691 housing units at an average density of 1,218.9 units per square mile (470.6 units/km^{2}), of which 33,027 (92.5%) were occupied. Of the occupied units, 58.6% were owner-occupied and 41.4% were occupied by renters. Of all units, 7.5% were vacant. The homeowner vacancy rate was 2.2%, and the rental vacancy rate was 7.9%.

=== 2010 census ===
The 2010 United States census reported that Hemet had a population of 78,657. The population density was 2,824.6 inhabitants per square mile (1,090.6/km^{2}). The racial makeup of Hemet was 53,259 (67.7%) White (51.8% Non-Hispanic White), 5,049 (6.4%) African American, 1,223 (1.6%) Native American, 2,352 (3.0%) Asian, 284 (0.4%) Pacific Islander, 12,371 (15.7%) from other races, and 4,119 (5.2%) from two or more races. There were 28,150 residents of Hispanic or Latino origin, of any race (35.8%).

The census reported that 78,043 people (99.2% of the population) lived in households, 155 (0.2%) lived in non-institutionalized group quarters, and 459 (0.6%) were institutionalized.

There were 30,092 households, out of which 9,700 (32.2%) had children under the age of 18 living in them, 13,174 (43.8%) were opposite-sex married couples living together, 4,349 (14.5%) had a female householder with no husband present, 1,623 (5.4%) had a male householder with no wife present. There were 2,002 (6.7%) unmarried opposite-sex partnerships, and 208 (0.7%) same-sex married couples or partnerships; 9,119 households (30.3%) were made up of individuals, and 5,754 (19.1%) had someone living alone who was 65 years of age or older. The average household size was 2.59. There were 19,146 families (63.6% of all households); the average family size was 3.24.

There were 20,340 people (25.9%) under the age of 18, 6,814 people (8.7%) aged 18 to 24, 17,323 people (22.0%) aged 25 to 44, 16,776 people (21.3%) aged 45 to 64, and 17,404 people (22.1%) who were 65 years of age or older. The median age was 39.0 years. For every 100 females, there were 88.9 males. For every 100 females age 18 and over, there were 84.3 males.

There were 35,305 housing units at an average density of 1,267.8 units per square mile (489.5 units/km^{2}), of which 18,580 (61.7%) were owner-occupied, and 11,512 (38.3%) were occupied by renters. The homeowner vacancy rate was 5.0%; the rental vacancy rate was 17.5%. 45,459 people (57.8% of the population) lived in owner-occupied housing units and 32,584 people (41.4%) lived in rental housing units.

=== 2009–2013 estimate ===
During 2009–2013, Hemet had a median household income of $32,774, with 23.3% of the population living below the federal poverty line.

== Economy ==
According to the California Economic Development Department, in 2005 the economy of Hemet was based on four main industries: retail trade, health care, educational services, and government. These industries provide 4,734, 4,441, and 3,946 jobs respectively. Other major industries in the city include leisure and hospitality, financial services, professional and business services, construction, and manufacturing. The amount of wage and salary positions in Hemet is 22,769, with a further 1,479 people being self-employed, adding up to a total of 24,248 jobs in the city.

Hemet was heavily impacted by the housing crisis which followed the 2008 financial crisis. Rent remains affordable, but the three-hour commute by Metrolink to Union Station in downtown Los Angeles has impeded Hemet's growth as a bedroom community.

=== Top employers ===
According to the City of Hemet's 2024 Annual Comprehensive Financial Report, the ten largest employers in the city are:

#	Employer	# of Employees
1	Hemet Unified School District	3,393
2	Physicians for Healthy Hospitals	1,077
3	County of Riverside	708
4	Walmart Supercenter	400
5	Stater Bros. Markets	344
6	City of Hemet	339
7	Forest River, Inc.	251
8	Tim Moran Ford, Toyota, Hyundai & Inland Chevrolet	236
9	Village Healthcare Retirement	215
10	The Home Depot	195

== Arts and culture ==
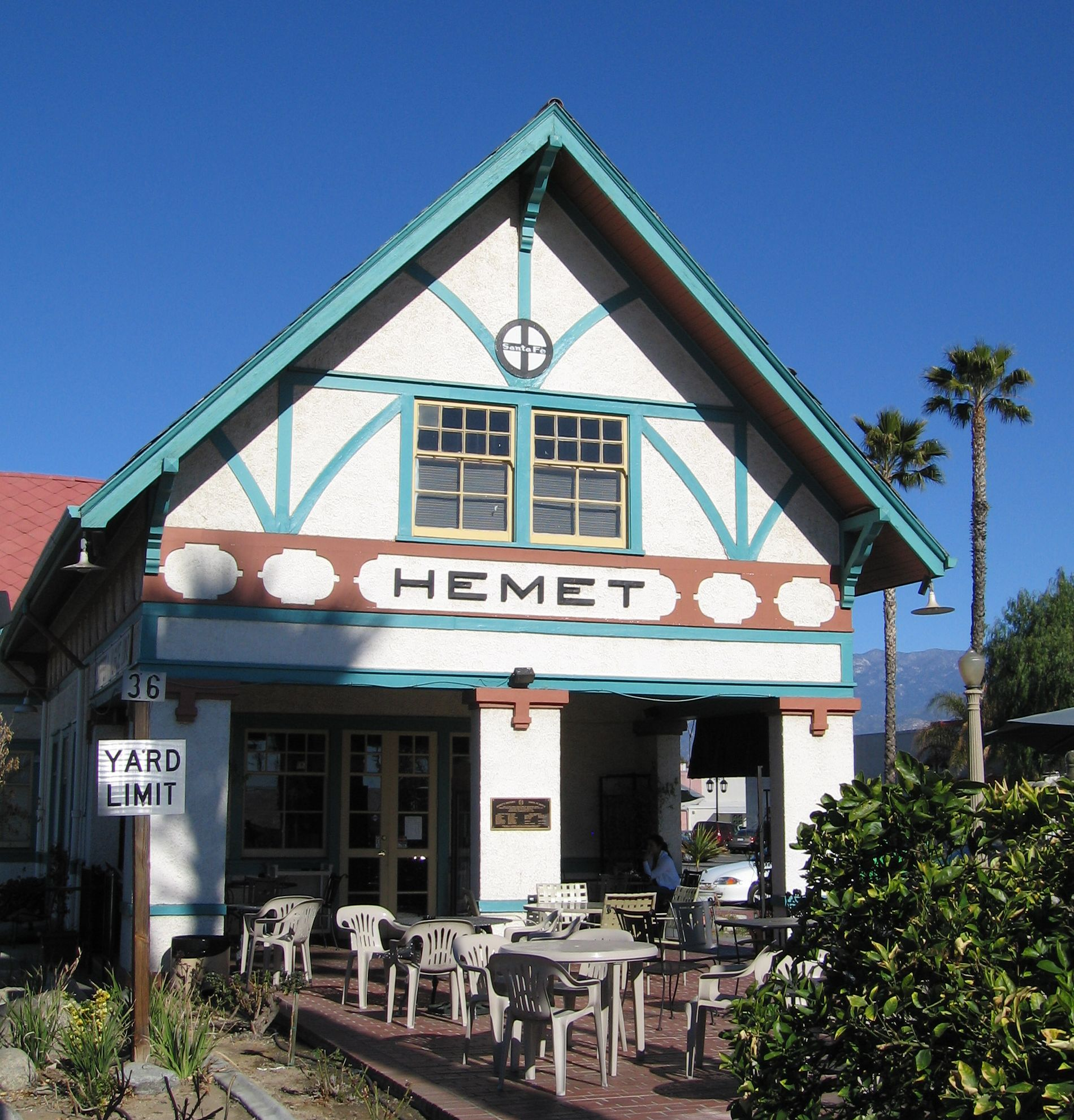
Hemet Museum/Old Santa Fe Depot on West Florida Avenue

The City of Hemet has two museums and an outdoor amphitheater. The Hemet Museum is located at the intersection of State Street and Florida Avenue in downtown. It is a museum of local history, and features photographs of old Hemet, historic photographs from the Ramona Pageant, as well as Cahuilla cultural belongings such as baskets and agriculture displays. Hemet is also home of the Western Science Center, located in the southern part of the city at the intersection of Domenigoni Parkway and Searl Parkway. It features exhibits of Ice Age mammals, including 'Max', the largest mastodon found in the Western United States, and 'Xena', a Columbian mammoth. Along with the two museums, science center and theater, close to Hemet there sits an outdoor amphitheater, the privately owned Ramona Bowl is a natural amphitheater located nearby in the Riverside county foothills. It is known for producing the play, Ramona.

=== Entertainment ===
The city of Hemet is expanding upon its entertainment venues. The three largest venues are the Ramona Bowl, an outdoor amphitheater, a Regal Cinemas and the Historic Hemet Theatre, built in 1921. A development being planned for the area is a downtown transit village, with the center of it being a Metrolink station. It will be north of the downtown core, and will consist of residences, shops, and parks. The station itself could feature a railroad museum, a heritage trail, and a farmer's market and market hall.

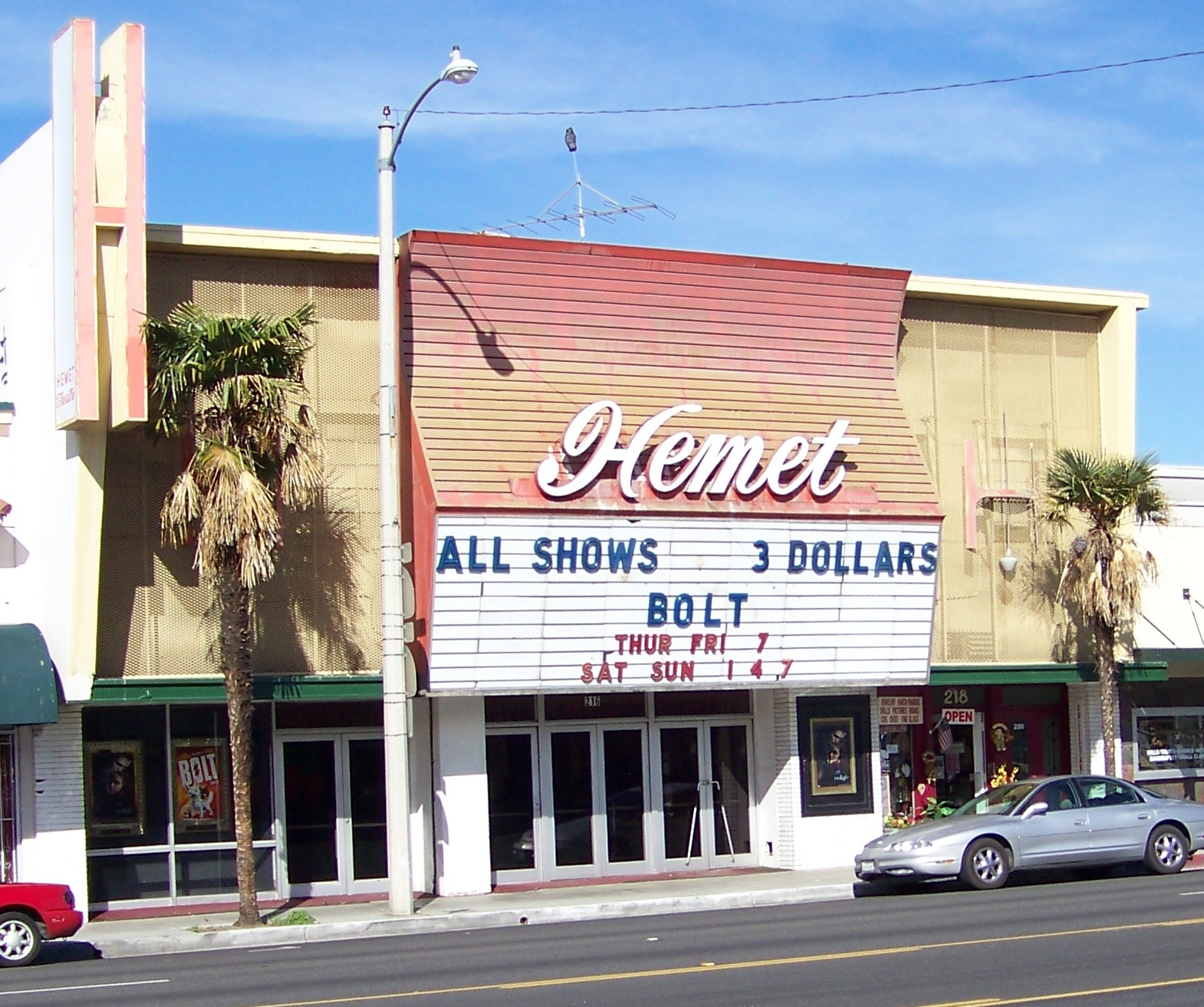
Hemet Theater

The Historic Hemet Theater was once the oldest continually run single-screen theater in the nation. However, the theater was forced to close down in January 2010 due to water damage from a fire that destroyed adjacent store fronts. The musty smell forced the theater to stay closed for a year, which created financial struggles. As of 2011, the foundation was incorporated as a non-profit 501(c)3 for the purpose of supporting community projects. In July 2013, the Historic Hemet Theater Foundation negotiated a five-year lease/option to purchase the theater. As of 2016, the Foundation had restored the Theater back to operation and was in the process of raising funds in order to purchase and restore the Hemet Historical Treasure.

Scenes for The Fast and the Furious (2001) were filmed on Domenigoni Parkway. The grandstands and track at the Hemet Stock Farm were a filming location for the movie Seabiscuit (2003). The movie Hemet, or the Landlady Don't Drink Tea (2023) was filmed in San Diego County, but the location setting is in Hemet.

== Parks and recreation ==
In addition to Diamond Valley Lake, Hemet has six large parks as part of the Valley-Wide Recreation and Parks District, which also includes the cities of San Jacinto and Menifee as well as a number of unincorporated areas.

=== Brubaker Park ===
Brubaker park contains one large children's play area, one half basketball court, eleven baseball/softball fields, fitness trails, two picnic areas, and one portable restroom.

=== Diamond Valley Lake Community Park ===
The Diamond Valley Lake Community Park opened in September 2009. The 85-acre (34 ha) park, part of the eastern recreation area of Diamond Valley Lake, has eight lighted ball fields, three soccer fields, four pickleball courts, four restrooms, and three picnic areas. The park is also adjacent to the Diamond Valley Aquatic Center.

=== Gibbel Park ===
Gibbel Park contains a large children's play area, one ball field, a half basketball court, restrooms, two lighted tennis courts, a lawn bowling green, horseshoe pits, picnic areas, and a large turf area for passive uses. The park also features a memorial of military branches of the United States. In October 2023, a skate park was opened. In 2024, pickleball courts were added. It has an area of 11 acres (45,000 m^{2}), and was established in 1970.

=== Mary Henley Park ===
Dedicated to Mary Henley, who was born in Hemet and served as Hemet City Clerk from October 1951 to March 1975. The park contains two playground areas, a half basketball court, picnic tables, shade structures, restrooms and a large turf area. There is a marked walking path/sidewalk of 0.75 miles (1.2 km) around the perimeter of the park. It has an area of 16 acres (65,000 m^{2}), and was established in 1993. A fitness court was opened in October 2022.

=== Simpson Park ===
Dedicated to James Simpson, member of the Hemet City Council from 1947 to 1948, and mayor from 1950 to 1966, Simpson Park is a wilderness park located in the Santa Rosa Hills southeast of Hemet with sheltered picnic area and tables, barbecues, restrooms, and hiking trails. At an elevation of 2,500 feet (760 m), it provides an expansive view of the San Jacinto Valley, as well as the nearby cities and towns of Winchester, Menifee, and Temecula, and it has an area of 438 acres (1.8 km^{2}).

=== Weston Park ===
Weston Park was established in 1921 and was dedicated to John B. Weston, who was president of the board of trustees from 1914 to 1920. It contains shuffleboard courts, restrooms, a playground, a basketball court, and a turf area for passive uses and games. It is located in the downtown area west of Santa Fe Street, and has an area of 4 acres (2 ha).

== Education ==
The educational services of the majority of the city are under the Hemet Unified School District. It covers most of Hemet, and parts of San Jacinto, and Valle Vista, with a student population of over 20,000 students. There are also HUSD member schools in the rural communities of Anza, Idyllwild and Winchester.

As of January 2010, the school district was facing having to possibly go far out of budget to fix the Historic Hemet Elementary school, due to the fact that it was built on top of a swamp and has been sinking deeper every year. The main building was built in 1927, and is one of the few historic landmarks left in Hemet. The other choice would be to demolish the school and build a new one in its place. The State of California will pay for 50% of either project, but the already cash-strapped district may run into trouble if the repairing of the school goes over budget. A new building could cost $20 million, with an extra $3 million to have it built in the original architectural style of the old building.

A portion of Hemet is in the San Jacinto Unified School District.

=== High schools ===
Hemet High School, Western Center Academy, West Valley High School and Tahquitz High School in Hemet and Hamilton High School in Anza.

=== Middle schools ===
Acacia Middle School, Diamond Valley Middle School, Dartmouth Middle School, Western Center Academy, and Rancho Viejo Middle School.

=== Elementary schools ===
Bautista Creek Elementary, Cawston Elementary, Fruitvale Elementary, Harmony Elementary, Hemet Elementary, Jacob Wiens Elementary, Little Lake Elementary, McSweeny Elementary, Ramona Elementary, Valle Vista Elementary, Whittier Elementary and Winchester Elementary.

=== All grade ===
Cottonwood School of Aguanga & Hamilton School of Anza.

=== Alternative schools ===
Advanced Path Studies School (credit recovery), Alessandro High School – continuation (grades 10–12), Baypoint Preparatory Academy (grades K–12), Family Tree Learning Center (grades K–8), Helen Hunt Jackson School for independent studies, Hemet Academy of Applied Academics and Technology (grades 9–12), Hemecinto Alternative Educational Center (grades 6–9), Western Center Academy (grades 6–12), River Springs Charter School (grades TK–5), and Renaissance Valley Academy (grades 6–12). The school is part of/owned by the Springs Charter School system, but operated elsewhere.

Dwelling Place Learning Academy (DPLA) is a Private Christian Academy. DPLA is K–5th grade with a student-to-teacher ratio of 16-to-1; their curriculum is based in the Weaver Curriculum (Unit Study). DPLA will add at least one grade a year until the 12th grade to become a K-12 school. DPLA began on August 17, 2015, and was incorporated as a 501(C)(3) in the State of California.

St. John's Christian School has been a private Christian school since 1983, offering classes for children between 18 months and the 8th grade.

== Media ==
=== Former ===
The Hemet News was a newspaper published from 1893 until 1999.

=== Current ===
Hemet and nearby San Jacinto are situated in the Los Angeles designated market area and are able to receive most of the Los Angeles and Riverside/San Bernardino area television stations via cable and satellite providers. Over the air signals with limited reception include KCAL-TV 9 (Independent) Los Angeles; KVCR-TV 24 (PBS) San Bernardino; KFMB-TV 8 (CBS), KUSI 9 (Independent) and KNSD 39 (NBC) from San Diego; two ABC stations KABC 7 L.A. and KESQ-TV 42 from Palm Springs; KOCE 50 (PBS) and KVEA 52 (Telemundo) from Orange County, California. A local TV station based in Hemet and nearby Perris is KZSW 27 (Independent) of Temecula.

== Infrastructure ==
=== Air ===
Commercial air service is provided by the Palm Springs International Airport and Ontario International Airport. Hemet-Ryan Airport, which is a municipal airport owned by Riverside County, is located in the city but has no commercial service.

=== Transportation ===
Public transit in Hemet is provided by the RTA, which has stops at various locations including Florida Avenue and Lincoln Avenue, and the Hemet Valley Mall. Routes in the Hemet area include: 28, 31, 44, 74, 79, and also RTA's Dial-a-ride for seniors and the disabled. Along with RTA's newest addition called MicroGo. Covering multiple Locations all over the Hemet, San Jacinto area, replacing the multiple discontinued routes in the valley.

Expansion of the Metrolink commuter rail service from Perris to Hemet has been discussed, with stations planned for West Hemet and Downtown Hemet.

=== Highways and streets ===
Two California State Highways cross the city. California State Route 74 runs along most of Florida Avenue, the main corridor of east and west transportation in Hemet, and California State Route 79 also follows Florida Avenue for a few miles in the city. Highway 79 is slated for re-alignment when the Mid County Parkway project begins. Streets in Hemet are arranged mostly in a standard grid. Almost all major streets that go east–west are avenues, and almost all streets going north–south are streets. Exceptions are Sanderson Avenue, Lyon Avenue, Palm Avenue and Cawston Avenue. Major streets in Hemet are Florida Avenue, Sanderson Avenue, San Jacinto Street, Stetson Avenue, and State Street.

== Library ==
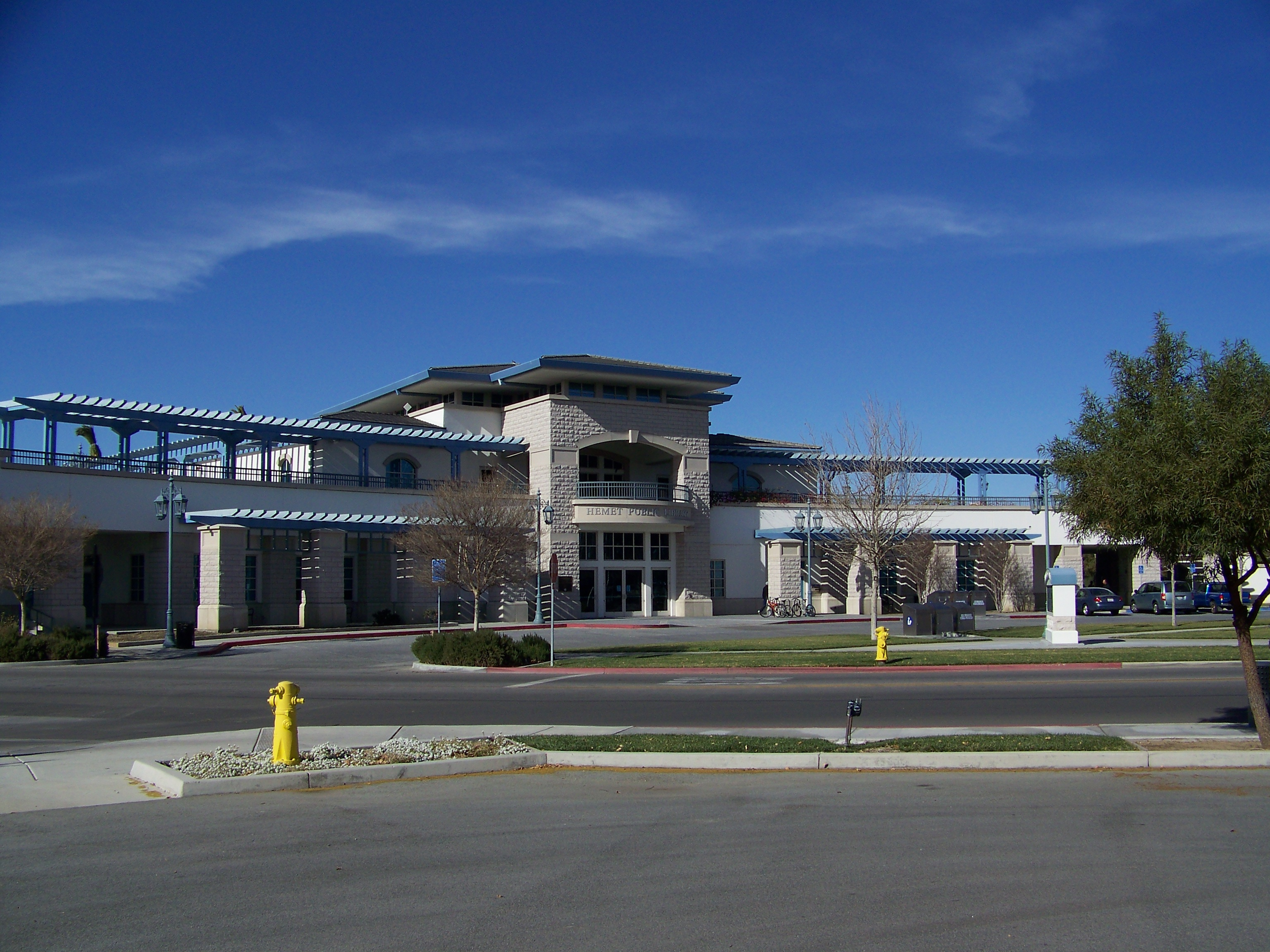
Hemet Public Library, located in downtown

The City of Hemet public library was created in 1906. Members of the Women's Club opened a reading room at the corner of Harvard Street and Florida Avenue.

In 1910, citizens of the newly formed city voted for its own library, and the city took over the operation of the facility built in 1906. Shortly after, the reading room became too small for the growing community, and groups and citizens lobbied for a newer, larger facility to house the growing collection of books. A woman of the community named Mrs. E.A. Davis was the one who wrote to Andrew Carnegie seeking funds to help build a new library. The city received $7,500 to fund part of the construction, and Mr. and Mrs. St. John donated land to the city to build the new Carnegie Library. The new library was finished in 1913, and served the city for 52 years. The building was declared unsafe by the Fire Marshall and razed in 1969, and the new C.B. Covell Memorial Library was built. This building however, also became too small for the city.

The library moved again in 2003, to its current facility, relocated for the first time since 1913. The new facility is now located at 300 E. Latham Avenue, just blocks from its former location. The new building is two stories tall, and contains 52,000 square feet (4,800 m^{2}). It was designed by John Loomis of 30th Street Architects at a cost of over $15 million.

== Notable people ==
- Carl Barks, cartoonist, author, and painter, 1942–1969
- Roland Bautista, guitarist
- Christopher Campbell, U.S. Treasury official
- Anthony Claggett, baseball player
- Jeff Van Gundy, NBA Coach
- Rod Hall, racer
- John E. King and Homer D. King, father-and-son publishers of the Hemet News between 1912 and 1961
- James Lafferty, actor
- Henning Dahl Mikkelsen, cartoonist
- David Miscavige, Church of Scientology leader
- Bill Murray, actor
- Mickey Rooney, Jr., actor and musician
- Tim Rooney, actor
- Monroe Salisbury, actor
- Brendan Steele, professional golfer
- L. E. Timberlake, Los Angeles City Council member, 1945–69
- Jennifer York, award-winning Los Angeles traffic reporter and bassist

== Sister cities ==
Hemet has five sister cities:

- Kushimoto (Japan)
- Bácum (Mexico)
- Ebeltoft (Denmark)
- Marumori (Japan)
- Cootamundra, (Australia)

== See also ==
- Largest cities in Southern California
- List of largest California cities by population
- List of sundown towns in the United States
