= Bethuel (disambiguation) =

Bethuel in Hebrew Bible, was an Aramean man, the youngest son of Nahor and Milcah, the nephew of Abraham, and the father of Laban and Rebecca.

Bethuel is a given name. It may also refer to:

== Given name ==
- Bethuel Kitchen (1812–1895), nineteenth-century American politician from Virginia and West Virginia
- Bethuel Peck (1788–1862), American physician and politician from New York
- Bethuel Ushona (born 1982), Namibian boxer
- Bethuel M. Webster (1900–1989), American lawyer in New York City

== Surname ==
- Fabrice Bethuel (born 1963), French mathematician
