= Rediker =

Rediker is a surname. Notable people with the surname include:

- Douglas Rediker (fl. 2007), American investment banker
- Heidi Crebo-Rediker (fl. 1990), American economist
- Marcus Rediker (born 1951), American professor, historian, writer, and activist
