= Bethuel =

Biblical character

Bethuel בְּתוּאֵל
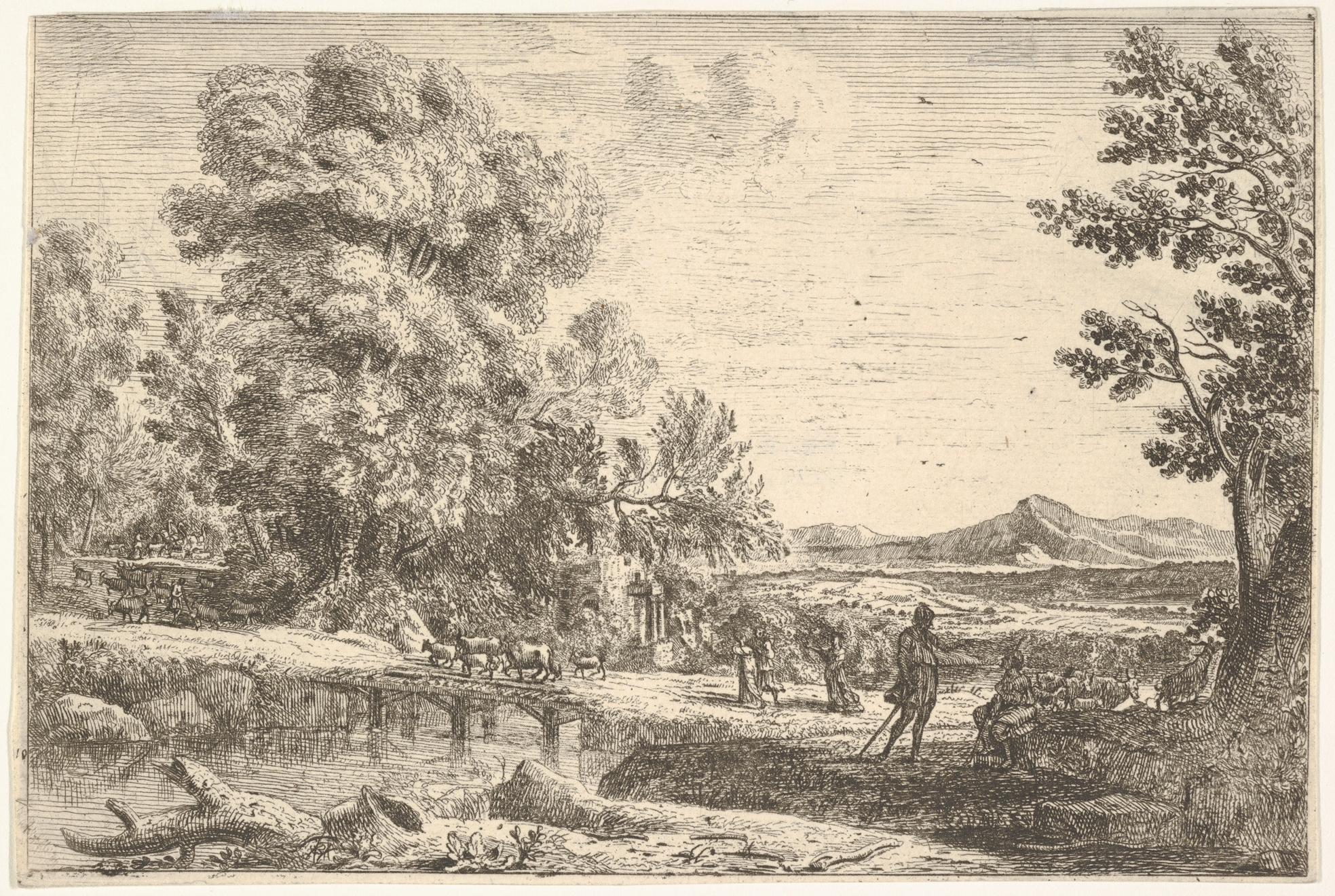
- Rebecca and Eliezer taking leave of her father, Bethuel, set in a landscape
- Born: Padan-aram, Aram-Naharaim, Sumer
- Children: Laban (son); Rebecca (daughter); Sahar (son, according to Book of Jasher)
- Parent(s): Nahor (father); Milcah (mother)

Bethuel (Hebrew: בְּתוּאֵל – Bəṯūʾēl), in the Hebrew Bible, was an Aramean man, the youngest son of Nahor and Milcah, the nephew of Abraham, and the father of Laban and Rebecca.

Bethuel was also a town in the territory of the tribe of Simeon, west of the Dead Sea. Some scholars identify it with Bethul and Bethel in southern Judah, to which David gives part of the spoils of his combat with the Amalekites.

== Biblical narrative ==
Bethuel appears nine times in the Hebrew Bible, all in the Book of Genesis. Adherents of the documentary hypothesis often attribute most of these verses to the Jahwist source, and the remainder to the priestly source.

Bethuel lived in Paddan Aram, identified as the area of Harran in Upper Mesopotamia. He was a descendant of Terah. Abraham, Bethuel's uncle, sent his senior servant to Paddan Aram to find a wife for his son Isaac. By the well outside of Nahor in Aram-Naharaim, the servant asked a young woman for water. She gave him water and also offered to draw water for his camels, then told him that she was "the daughter of Bethuel the son of Milcah, whom she bore to Nahor". The servant asked if there was room for him to stay overnight in Bethuel's house.

The servant told Rebecca's household his good fortune in meeting Bethuel's daughter, recognising her as Abraham's relative. Laban and Bethuel answer, "'The matter was decreed by יהוה; we cannot speak to you bad or good. Here is Rebekah before you; take her and go, and let her be a wife to your master's son, as יהוה has spoken.'"

After meeting Abraham's servant, Rebecca "ran and told all this to her mother's household", that Rebecca's "brother and her mother said, "'Let the maiden remain with us some ten days; then you may go'. ... So they sent off their sister Rebekah and her nurse along with Abraham's servant and his entourage." Some scholars thus hypothesize that mention of Bethuel in Genesis 24:50 was a late addition to the preexisting story. Other scholars argue that these texts indicate that Bethuel was somehow incapacitated. Other scholars attribute the emphasis on the mother's role to a matrilineal family structure. Despite the importance of Rebekah's mother in the narrative of this bible passage, her name is not mentioned.

A generation later, Isaac and Rebecca sent their son Jacob back to Paddan Aram to take a wife from among Laban's daughters, Bethuel's granddaughters, rather than from among the Canaanites.

== Rabbinic interpretation ==
In the Talmud, Rabbi Isaac called Bethuel a wicked man. The midrash identified Bethuel as a king.

The Book of Jasher, a collection of sayings of the sages from the Amoraim period, lists the children of Bethuel as Sahar, Laban, and their sister Rebecca.

In the Talmud, Abba Arikha in the name of Reuben ben Strobilus cited Laban's and Bethuel's response to Abraham's servant as a proof text for the proposition that God destines a woman and a man for each other in marriage in Moed.

Joshua ben Nehemiah, in the name of Hanina bar Isaac, said that the decree regarding Rebecca that Laban and Bethuel acknowledged came from Mount Moriah in Genesis Rabbah 60:10.

Noting that Genesis 24:55 reports that the next day, Rebekah's "brother and her mother said, 'Let the maiden remain with us some ten days'", the Rabbis asked "Where was Bethuel?". The midrash concluded that Bethuel wished to hinder Rebekah's marriage, and so he was smitten during the night. (Genesis Rabbah 60:12.) The Rabbis said that Abraham's servant did not disclose Bethuel's fate to Isaac.

In his retelling of the story, Josephus reported that Rebekah told Abraham's servant, "my father was Bethuel, but he is dead; and Laban is my brother; and, together with my mother, takes care of all our family affairs, and is the guardian of my virginity."

== See also ==
- Abraham's family tree
- Bethuel M. Webster (1900–1989), American lawyer and founder of Webster & Sheffield
