= Michael Mukasey =

American lawyer and jurist (born 1941)

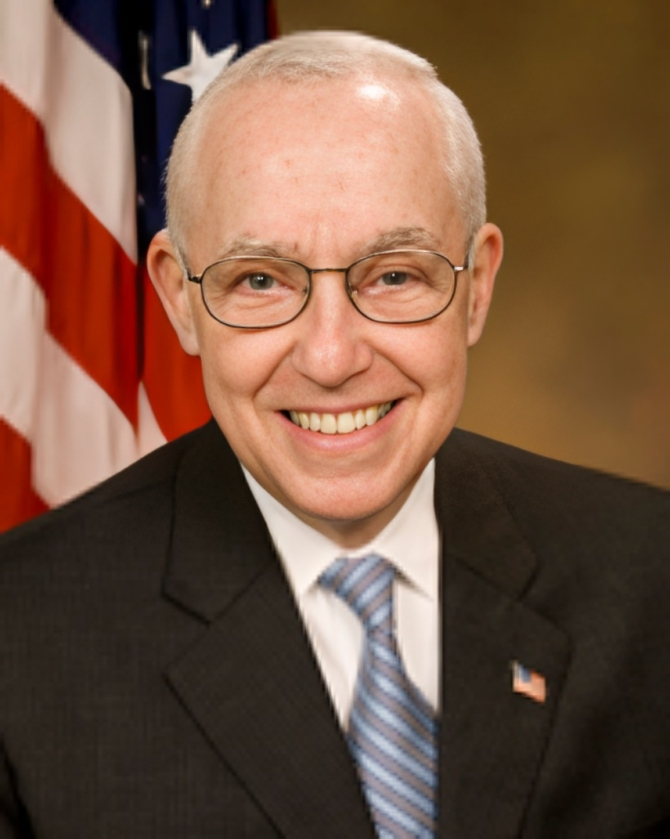
- Official portrait, 2007

81st United States Attorney General
- In office November 9, 2007 – January 20, 2009
- President: George W. Bush
- Deputy: Craig S. Morford (acting); Mark Filip
- Preceded by: Alberto Gonzales
- Succeeded by: Eric Holder

Senior Judge of the United States District Court for the Southern District of New York
- In office August 1, 2006 – September 9, 2006

Chief Judge of the United States District Court for the Southern District of New York
- In office March 12, 2000 – August 1, 2006
- Preceded by: Thomas P. Griesa
- Succeeded by: Kimba Wood

Judge of the United States District Court for the Southern District of New York
- In office November 9, 1987 – August 1, 2006
- Appointed by: Ronald Reagan
- Preceded by: Abraham David Sofaer
- Succeeded by: Richard J. Sullivan

Personal details
- Born: Michael Bernard Mukasey; July 28, 1941 (age 85) New York City, New York, U.S.
- Party: Republican
- Spouse: Susan Mukasey
- Children: 2
- Education: Columbia University (BA); Yale University (LLB)
- Mukasey's voice Mukasey testifying on staffing federal prisons before the House Judiciary Committee. Recorded July 23, 2008

Michael Bernard Mukasey (/mjuːˈkeɪzi/; born July 28, 1941) is an American lawyer and jurist who served as the 81st United States attorney general from 2007 to 2009 and as a U.S. district judge of the U.S. District Court for the Southern District of New York from 1987 to 2006.

Mukasey graduated from Columbia University with a degree in history and received a Bachelor of Laws from Yale Law School. He worked in private practice for two decades and spent four years as an assistant United States attorney in the office of the United States Attorney for the Southern District of New York. In 1987, after being nominated by President Ronald Reagan, Mukasey was confirmed as a judge of the U.S. District Court for the Southern District of New York. He became Chief Judge in 2000 and served in that capacity until his retirement in 2006.

In 2007, Mukasey was nominated to the position of United States Attorney General by President George W. Bush following the resignation of Alberto Gonzales. Upon his Senate confirmation and swearing-in, Mukasey became the second Jewish attorney general in U.S. history. He left office after Bush's term as president ended.

== Early life and education ==
Mukasey was born on July 28, 1941, in New York City. His father was born near Baranavichy in Belarus and emigrated to the U.S. in 1921. Mukasey graduated in 1959 from the Ramaz School, a Modern Orthodox Jewish prep school in Manhattan.

After high school, Mukasey studied history at Columbia University, where he was the editorials editor of the Columbia Daily Spectator and graduated in 1963 with a Bachelor of Arts. While there, he may have been a member of the Sachems. Mukasey then attended Yale Law School, where he was an editor of the Yale Law Journal. He graduated in 1967 with a Bachelor of Laws.

== Early career ==
Mukasey practiced law for 20 years in New York City, serving for four years as an Assistant U.S. Attorney in the U.S. Attorney's Office for the Southern District of New York in which he worked with Rudolph Giuliani. From 1967 to 1972, he was an associate with the law firm of Webster Sheffield Fleischmann Hitchcock & Brookfield, later known as Webster & Sheffield. In 1976, he joined the New York law firm of Patterson Belknap Webb & Tyler. Mukasey began teaching at Columbia Law School in the spring of 1993.

== Judicial career ==
On July 27, 1987, Mukasey was nominated to be a United States District Judge of the United States District Court for the Southern District of New York in Manhattan by President Ronald Reagan, to a seat vacated by Abraham David Sofaer. Mukasey was confirmed by the United States Senate on November 6, 1987, and received his commission on November 9, 1987; he took the bench in 1988. He served in that position for 18 years, including tenure as Chief Judge from March 2000 through July 2006.

During his service on the bench, Mukasey presided over the criminal prosecution of Omar Abdel Rahman and El Sayyid Nosair, whom he sentenced to life in prison for a plot to blow up the United Nations and other Manhattan landmarks uncovered during an investigation into the 1993 World Trade Center bombing. During that case, Mukasey spoke out against leaks by law enforcement officials regarding the facts of the case allegedly aimed at prejudicing potential jurors against the defendants. During that case, Mukasey also refused to recuse himself, warning that the demand for his recusal would "disqualify not only an obscure district judge such as the author of this opinion, but also Justices Brandeis and Frankfurter ... each having been both a Jew and a Zionist."

Mukasey also presided over the trial of Jose Padilla, ruling that the U.S. citizen and alleged terrorist could be held as an enemy combatant but was entitled to see his lawyers. Mukasey also was the judge in the litigation between developer Larry Silverstein and several insurance companies arising from the destruction of the World Trade Center. In a 2003 suit, he issued a preliminary injunction preventing the Motion Picture Association of America from enforcing its ban against the distribution of screener copies of films during awards season, ruling that the ban was likely an unlawful restraint of trade unfair to independent filmmakers.

In June 2003, Democratic New York Senator Charles Schumer submitted Mukasey's name, along with four other Republicans or Republican appointees, as a suggestion for Bush to consider for nomination to the Supreme Court.

On October 14, 2004, citing U.S. Supreme Court precedent, Mukasey reversed his September 2002 decision and dismissed a case in which plaintiffs in twenty consolidated actions sued the Italian insurance company Generali S.p.A. (Generali), seeking damages for nonpayment of insurance proceeds to beneficiaries of policies purchased by Holocaust victims before the end of World War II. In so ruling, Mukasey gave deference to "a federal executive branch policy favoring voluntary resolution of Holocaust-era insurance claims."

=== Retirement ===
Although Article III of the U.S. Constitution entitles federal judges to hold their appointments for life, in June 2006 Mukasey announced that he would retire as a judge and return to private practice at the end of the summer. On August 1, 2006, he was succeeded as Chief Judge of the Southern District by Judge Kimba Wood, entering senior status on the same day. Mukasey's retirement took effect on September 9, 2006.

== U.S. Attorney General ==
On the March 18, 2007, episode of Meet the Press, Senator Chuck Schumer suggested Mukasey as a potential Attorney General nominee who, "by [his] reputation and career, shows that [he] put rule of law first."

On September 17, 2007, Mukasey was nominated by President Bush to replace Alberto Gonzales as US Attorney General. At his nomination press conference with the President, Mukasey stated, "The task of helping to protect our security, which the Justice Department shares with the rest of our government, is not the only task before us. The Justice Department must also protect the safety of our children, the commerce that assures our prosperity, and the rights and liberties that define us as a nation."

Because Mukasey would likely serve only until the end of President Bush's term in January 2009, the White House hoped Mukasey would be confirmed by the Senate by October 8, 2007. At first, a quick confirmation seemed likely. Senator Patrick Leahy, the Democratic Chairman of the Senate Judiciary Committee, was pleased that Mukasey was committed to a new administrative rule that would reduce the influence of the White House and other politicians on Justice Department investigations and personnel. This concession sought to avoid problems that arose during the controversy over the dismissal of U.S. Attorneys under the previous Attorney General's tenure.

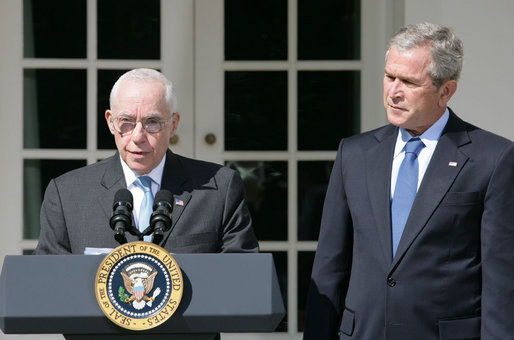
President George W. Bush listens to remarks by Mukasey after announcing his nomination to be Attorney General.

However, during confirmation hearings, controversy arose over Mukasey's responses to questions about torture. Mukasey refused to state a clear legal position on the interrogation technique known as waterboarding (in which water is poured over a rag on the prisoner's face to simulate drowning). Leahy and the other nine Democratic committee members indicated to Mukasey, via letter, that they were "deeply troubled by your refusal to state unequivocally that waterboarding is illegal during your confirmation hearing..."

It appeared that Mukasey may have been concerned about the potential pursuit of government employees or agents, and their authorizing superiors, in American or foreign courts under criminal charges, when responding to the Senate Judiciary committee questions. In describing the issue's challenges to the Bush administration, The New York Times quoted Scott L. Silliman, director of the Center on Law, Ethics and National Security at Duke University, as saying about such court cases, which could ultimately reach the president: "You would ask not just who carried it out, but who specifically approved it."

However, Robert M. Chesney, of Wake Forest University School of Law, and other national security specialists have pointed out that prosecution within the United States would be impeded by laws adopted since 2005 which permit safe-harbor protections to interrogators for governmentally authorized actions. It was believed that secret Justice Department legal opinions approved waterboarding and other procedures officially called "harsh interrogation techniques".

By November 1, 2007, five senators – Christopher Dodd of Connecticut, Joseph Biden of Delaware, John Kerry of Massachusetts, Edward Kennedy of Massachusetts, and Bernie Sanders of Vermont – in addition to Leahy had announced their intention to vote against Mukasey's confirmation due to concerns about his stance on torture. Nevertheless, on November 6 the Senate Judiciary Committee endorsed the nomination of Mukasey, by an 11–8 vote, and sent his confirmation on to the full Senate. Two days later, the Senate confirmed Mukasey by a 53–40 vote. The tight vote was the narrowest margin to confirm an attorney general in more than 50 years. Mukasey was sworn in at a private ceremony on November 9, 2007.

In 2009, legal ethics complaints were filed against Mukasey and other Bush administration attorneys for their roles in advocating torture.

== Later career ==
On September 12, 2006, following Mukasey's retirement from the bench, Patterson Belknap Webb & Tyler announced that Mukasey had rejoined the firm as a partner.

As of 2025, he is of counsel at the international law firm of Debevoise & Plimpton.

Mukasey, pursuant to the Foreign Agents Registration Act (FARA), is registered as working on behalf of the National Council of Resistance of Iran.

Mukasey is the recipient of several awards, most notably the Learned Hand Medal of the Federal Bar Council.

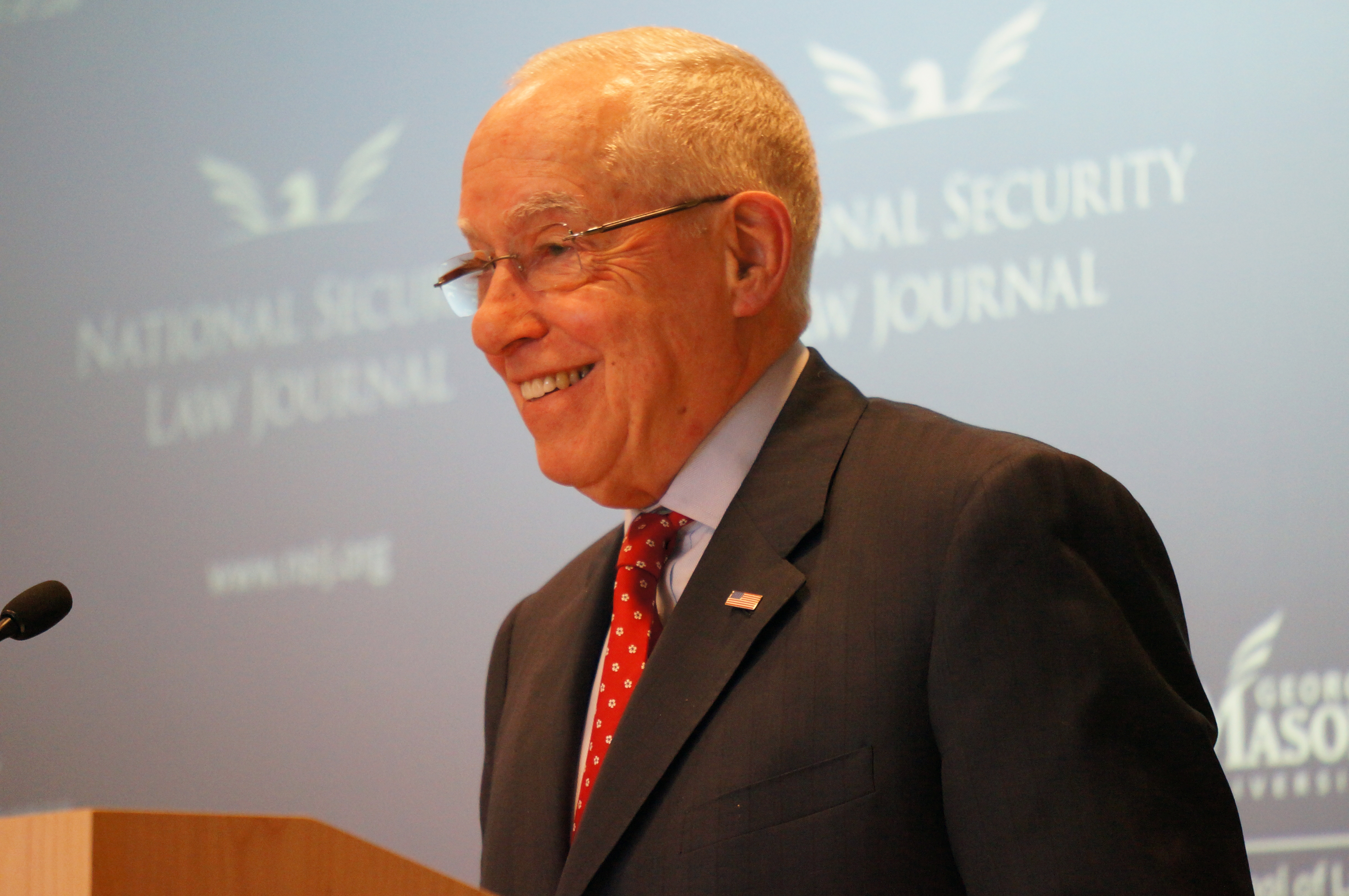
Mukasey speaking at the National Security Law Journal symposium on NSA surveillance, March 26, 2014, in Arlington, Virginia.

== Relationship with Rudy Giuliani ==
Mukasey and Rudolph Giuliani have been friends since working at the same law firm in the early 1970s.

Mukasey administered the oath of office to Mayor-elect Giuliani in 1994 and 1998.

Mukasey pledged that as U.S. attorney general, he would recuse himself from cases involving Giuliani. Newspaper reports assumed that Mukasey would further recuse himself from cases involving Bernard Kerik, a former New York City police commissioner under Giuliani, who was under federal investigation for bribery and other offenses. However, neither presidential spokespersons nor Mukasey returned reporters' inquiries into whether Mukasey would recuse himself from the Kerik case.

After retiring from the bench, Mukasey made campaign contributions to Giuliani for president. Mukasey and his son, Marc Mukasey, were justice advisers to Giuliani's presidential campaign. During Giuliani's 2008 presidential campaign, Marc Mukasey was assigned by Giuliani's campaign to block Bernard Kerik's legal defense team from interviewing witnesses that might assist his defense in an attempt to protect Giuliani from the Kerik case.

During an Oval Office meeting with Rudy Giuliani in 2017, Mukasey pressed Secretary of State Rex Tillerson for the release of the indicted Turkish-Iranian gold trader, Reza Zarrab.

== Viewpoints ==
=== Alberto Gonzalez ===
On August 12, 2008, Mukasey told American Bar Association annual meeting delegates that "not every wrong, or even every violation of the law, is a crime," with "only violations of the civil service laws" being found among hiring practices during Alberto Gonzales' tenure as Attorney General.

=== Attorney-client privilege ===
On April 18, 2018, Mukasey published an op-ed piece in The Wall Street Journal entitled "Trump, Cohen and Attorney-Client Privilege" attacking the use of a search warrant by the federal government to search Michael Cohen's legal records and attacking the track records of former FBI directors/assistant US Attorneys Robert Mueller and James Comey.

=== Crack cocaine ===
In 2007, the United States Sentencing Commission amended the Federal Sentencing Guidelines to lessen the disparity between the penalties for the possession and trafficking of powder cocaine and crack cocaine, citing racial disparity and the unfairness of the 100:1 crack-powder penalty threshold ratio. The Commission instead implemented an 18:1 ratio. Mukasey vehemently opposed and testified against this change, warning that thousands of violent criminals may be released under the guidelines and endanger the community. Mukasey's move was criticized by advocates of elimination of crack-powder disparity.

=== Terrorism ===
In May 2004, while still a member of the judiciary, Mukasey delivered a speech (which he converted into a The Wall Street Journal opinion piece) that defended the USA PATRIOT Act. The piece also expressed doubt that the FBI engaged in racial profiling of Arabs and criticized the American Library Association for condemning the Patriot Act but not taking a position on librarians imprisoned in Cuba.

On August 22, 2007, The Wall Street Journal published another op-ed by Mukasey in which he argued that "current institutions and statutes are not well suited to even the limited task of supplementing a military effort to combat Islamic terrorism." Mukasey instead advocated for Congress, which "has the constitutional authority to establish additional inferior courts," to "turn [its] considerable talents to deliberating how to fix a strained and mismatched legal system."

Speaking in London on March 14, 2008, Mukasey said that he hoped the detainees charged with participating in the September 11 attacks are not executed if found guilty in order to avoid creating any martyrs. Speaking in New York on March 5, 2012, Mukasey said his comments in 2008 were taken out of context. His "martyr" comment was a humorous reason offered as the only reason not to seek the death penalty. He then said if the detainees were found guilty, they should be executed.

=== Waterboarding ===
On December 11, 2014, Mukasey publicly stated on CNN that he believed waterboarding could not be called torture. In a 2008 hearing, he said waterboarding would feel like torture if he were subjected to it. Asked directly if Mukasey was a liar because he claimed that enhanced interrogation produced useful intelligence, Senator John McCain stated unequivocally, "Yes, I know that he is. Even if we had gotten useful information, the propaganda and the image and the behavior of the greatest nation on earth from torturing people is not what we want and it helps the enemy."

== Personal life ==
Mukasey is married to Susan Mukasey, who has worked as a teacher and headmistress of the lower school at the Ramaz School. The Mukaskeys have a daughter, Jessica, and a son, Marc. Marc Mukasey is a founding partner of Mukasey Frenchman LLP, a small law firm in New York City.

== See also ==
- List of Jewish American jurists
- List of Jewish United States Cabinet members

Legal offices
Preceded by Abraham David Sofaer	Judge of the United States District Court for the Southern District of New York; 1987–2006	Succeeded by Richard J. Sullivan
Preceded by Thomas P. Griesa	Chief Judge of the United States District Court for the Southern District of New York; 2000–2006	Succeeded by Kimba Wood
Political offices
Preceded by Alberto Gonzales	United States Attorney General; 2007–2009	Succeeded by Eric Holder
U.S. order of precedence (ceremonial)
Preceded by Robert Gates as Former U.S. Cabinet Member	Order of precedence of the United States as Former U.S. Cabinet Member	Succeeded by James Peake as Former U.S. Cabinet Member
