= William Meagher =

William Meagher may refer to:

- William Meagher (Irish politician) (died 1897), Irish politician
- William R. Meagher (1903–1981), American lawyer
