= Joseph Flom =

American lawyer

Joseph H. Flom
- Born: December 21, 1923; Baltimore, Maryland, U.S.
- Died: February 23, 2011 (aged 87); New York City, U.S.
- Education: City College of New York; Harvard University (LLB)
- Occupation: Lawyer
- Spouses: Claire Cohen (m. 1958–2007) Judi Sorensen (m. 2008)
- Children: Jason Flom, Peter Flom

Joseph Harold Flom (December 21, 1923 – February 23, 2011) was an American lawyer and pioneer of mergers and acquisitions, specializing in representing companies in takeover battles. By the 1980s, he had acquired a reputation of being "Mr. Takeover" (whereas Martin Lipton was known as "Mr. Defense"). Flom became a partner at what is now known as Skadden, Arps, Slate, Meagher & Flom in 1954, and helped transform it from a four-lawyer firm into one of the largest law firms in the United States. In 1999, The American Lawyer named him one of their "Lawyers of the Century".

== Early life ==
Flom was born in Baltimore, Maryland to Itzak (Isadore) Flom, a labor organizer in the Garment District, Manhattan, and the former Fannie Fishman. Both parents were Jewish immigrants from a shtetl in the Russian Empire, and—although they were already married—came to the United States separately, shortly after World War I. Three years after Joe Flom was born in Baltimore, the family moved to Borough Park, Brooklyn, New York City, where Joseph Flom grew up.

== Education ==
After graduating from Townsend Harris High School, Flom worked as an office boy in a law firm during the day, while attending City College of New York on a pre-law major at night. Two years into his studies, World War II broke out and Flom was drafted into the Army. However, he never saw any fighting, as he was part of a group of 20 soldiers that were sent to a radar repair school. After the war ended, despite not having graduated from college, he enrolled at Harvard Law School on the G.I. Bill, where he was classmates with Charlie Munger and graduated in 1948.

== Career ==
After law school, Flom joined a law firm run by Marshall Skadden, Leslie Arps, and John Slate. He eventually became a partner in 1954, effectively taking over leadership of the firm a couple years later. Flom began working on mergers and acquisitions in the early 1970s when most New York law firms did not, and by the early 1980s was among the dominant figures, with rival lawyer Martin Lipton and top investment banker Bruce Wasserstein. Clients hired Flom because Lipton or Wasserstein was on the other side, and vice versa. (Flom and Lipton were friends who lunched together once a week.) By the time of Flom's death, Skadden Arps was one of the largest and most profitable law firms in the world.

Flom was appointed by Mayor Ed Koch as chairman of the New York City Commission on the Bicentennial of the U.S. Constitution in 1987, a post he held until the commission completed its work, issued its report, and was dissolved in early 1990. The commission's efforts included an extensive civic-education campaign and the creation of a celebratory re-enactment on 30 April 1989 of the inauguration of George Washington as the first president of the United States.

Malcolm Gladwell devoted a chapter to Flom in his book Outliers, crediting him with building out and diversifying the firm and anticipating the rise of mergers and acquisitions as a specialty. "For 20 years, he perfected his craft at Skadden," Gladwell wrote. "Then the world changed and he was ready."

Flom was also mentioned in Jeffrey Madrick's book Age of Greed for his contribution to the world of hostile takeovers in the American economy. Madrick wrote, "his interest in the takeover gave his firm the lifeline they needed to survive."

== Personal ==
On February 23, 2011, Flom died in New York City from heart failure. His wife, Judi Sorensen Flom, also an attorney, was at his side. He has two children: Jason Flom, a music executive and advocate of prison reform and Peter, who is a published author and holds a PhD.
