= Mark Filip =

American judge (born 1966)

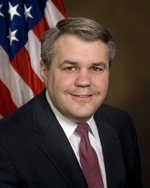

Acting United States Attorney General
- In office January 20, 2009 – February 3, 2009
- President: Barack Obama
- Deputy: Vacant
- Preceded by: Michael Mukasey
- Succeeded by: Eric Holder

33rd United States Deputy Attorney General
- In office March 10, 2008 – January 20, 2009
- President: George W. Bush
- Preceded by: Paul McNulty
- Succeeded by: David W. Ogden

Judge of the United States District Court for the Northern District of Illinois
- In office February 8, 2004 – March 9, 2008
- Appointed by: George W. Bush
- Preceded by: Harry Leinenweber
- Succeeded by: Sharon Johnson Coleman

Personal details
- Born: Mark Robert Filip; June 1, 1966 (age 60) Chicago, Illinois, U.S.
- Party: Republican
- Education: University of Illinois, Urbana-Champaign (BA); Christ Church, Oxford (BA); Harvard University (JD)

Mark Robert Filip (born June 1, 1966) is an American lawyer specializing in class action, white collar criminal and regulatory defense. Formerly a partner at Skadden, Arps, he currently practices in the Washington, D.C. office of Kirkland and Ellis. From 2004 until 2008, Filip served as a United States district judge of the United States District Court for the Northern District of Illinois. As the George W. Bush administration ended, Filip served as Deputy Attorney General of the United States, and as the Barack Obama administration began he briefly served as acting attorney general (from January 20, 2009, to February 3, 2009).

== Early life and education ==
Born in Chicago, Illinois, Filip attended Maine South High School in Park Ridge, Illinois, the same high school attended by Hillary Clinton. He graduated from the University of Illinois at Urbana-Champaign in 1988 with Bachelor of Arts degrees in economics and history, where he was a member of Phi Kappa Psi fraternity. After college, Filip went to England to attend Christ Church, Oxford, on a Marshall Scholarship. He graduated from Oxford in 1990 with a Bachelor of Arts in law with first-class honors. He then attended Harvard Law School, where he received his Juris Doctor, magna cum laude, in 1992 and was an editor of the Harvard Law Review.

After law school, Filip served as a law clerk to the Judge Stephen F. Williams of the United States Court of Appeals for the District of Columbia Circuit from 1992 until 1993 and then for Justice Antonin Scalia of the Supreme Court from 1993 until 1994.

== Professional career ==
Filip worked in private legal practice as an associate at Kirkland & Ellis from 1994 until 1995. He then worked as an Assistant United States Attorney in Chicago from 1995 to 1999. In that position he prosecuted cases in the trial and appellate courts involving a variety of offenses—including violent crimes, political, judicial, and police corruption, health care fraud, and international narcotics trafficking. While an AUSA, Filip received a Department of Justice Director's Award for Superior Performance as an Assistant U.S. Attorney.

Following his service at the U.S. Attorney's Office, Filip was a partner in the Chicago office of Skadden, Arps, Slate, Meagher & Flom from 1999 until 2004. There, he practiced in a variety of areas of civil law and criminal law, and also had a number of pro bono cases, including several cases representing indigent defendants in connection with the Federal Defender's Office in Chicago. Filip now is a partner in the Chicago office of Kirkland & Ellis.

== Federal judicial service ==
On April 28, 2003, Filip was nominated by President Bush to be a United States District Court judge for the Northern District of Illinois, to a seat vacated by Harry Leinenweber. On February 4, 2004, the United States Senate confirmed his nomination by a 96–0 vote. He received his commission on February 8, 2004 and was sworn into office in March 2004. As a judge, he presided over numerous cases involving criminal, antitrust, securities fraud, immigration and other matters. Filip has taught for many years at the University of Chicago Law School, where he served from 2004 to March 2008 as the Bustin Lecturer and taught both advanced criminal law and first-year civil procedure. Filip resigned on March 9, 2008 to accept his role as the United States Deputy Attorney General.

== Deputy attorney general and acting attorney general ==
Filip was unanimously confirmed by the United States Senate on March 3, 2008, and he was sworn in as deputy attorney general on March 10, 2008. On August 28, 2008, Filip issued a memo regarding federal prosecution of business organizations, which reversed the Justice Department's aggressive policy of pursuing white collar crime. This came in the midst of a controversial case against KPMG, one of the Big Four accounting firms, for abetting AIG Financial Products in fraudulent transactions that would eventually contribute to the 2008 financial crisis. Filip was asked to assume the position of acting attorney general by then president-elect Obama. Filip led the department while President Obama's nominee, then attorney-general designate Eric Holder, awaited confirmation by the United States Senate. Holder was confirmed on February 2, 2009, and sworn in the next day thus ending Filip's tenure as the acting attorney general.

== See also ==
- List of law clerks for the ninth seat of the Supreme Court of the United States

Legal offices
Preceded by Harry Leinenweber	Judge of the United States District Court for the Northern District of Illinois; 2004–2008	Succeeded by Sharon Johnson Coleman
Preceded by Craig S. Morford; Acting	United States Deputy Attorney General; 2008–2009	Succeeded by David W. Ogden
Preceded by Michael Mukasey	United States Attorney General; Acting; 2009	Succeeded by Eric Holder
