= Brian P. Burns =

American entrepreneur (1936–2021)

Brian Patrick Burns
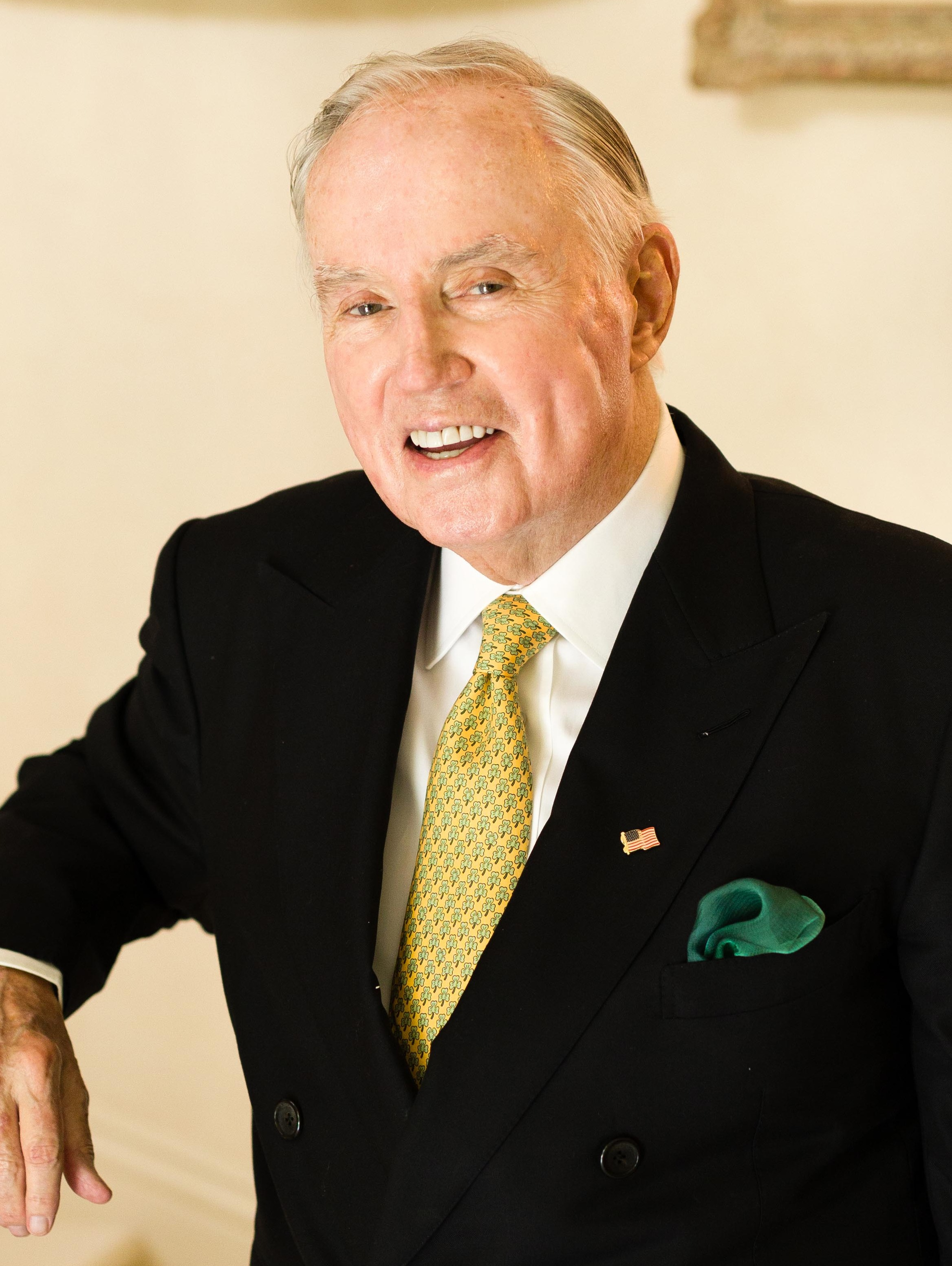
- Burns in 2016
- Born: July 12, 1936; Boston, Massachusetts, U.S.
- Died: August 12, 2021 (aged 85)
- Education: College of the Holy Cross (BA); Harvard University (LLB)
- Occupation: Philanthropist

Brian Patrick Burns (July 12, 1936 – August 12, 2021) was an American businessman, lawyer, and philanthropist. He was a noted collector of Irish art. In December 2016, Maggie Haberman of The New York Times reported that then president-elect Donald Trump intended to name Burns as the next United States Ambassador to Ireland. However, in June 2017, Burns withdrew his name from consideration, due to ill health.

== Early life and education ==
Burns was born in Boston, Massachusetts, on July 12, 1936. He was a third-generation Irish American with ancestry from County Kerry, Ireland. His father, John J. Burns (1901–1957), became a full professor of law at Harvard Law School at the age of 29 and became a judge of the Massachusetts Superior Court at age 30. Burns Sr. was the first general counsel of the Securities and Exchange Commission (SEC), when it was chaired by Joseph P. Kennedy Sr. In 1936, after resigning his position as counsel to the SEC, Burns Sr. entered private legal practice as a senior partner in the firm of Burns, Currie, Rich and Rice of New York.

After graduating from the Saint Sebastian's School, Burns attended the College of the Holy Cross in Worcester, Massachusetts, and graduated with a Bachelor of Arts in English literature in 1957. He then earned a Bachelor of Laws (LL.B.) from Harvard Law School in 1959, at the age of 23.

== Professional career ==
Brian P. Burns was chairman of BF Enterprises, Inc., a publicly owned real estate holding and development company. He was a partner at several law firms in San Francisco including, Burns & Whitehead (1978–1986); Cullinan, Burns & Helmer (1975–1978); and Cullinan, Hancock, Rothert & Burns (1965–1974). Burns was a director of the Kellogg Company of Battle Creek, Michigan, from 1979 to 1989 and served as the first Chairman of its Finance Committee. He also served as a director and Chairman of the Executive Committee of The Coca-Cola Bottling Co. of New York, Inc. He began his career as an associate at Webster, Sheffield, Fleischmann, Hitchcock & Brookfield in New York City (1960–1964). In 1958–1959, he was Special Assistant to the Regional Administrator of the SEC's New York Regional Office.

=== American Ireland Fund merger ===
In 1963, President John F. Kennedy appointed Burns to be the first director of the American Irish Foundation. As director of the American Irish Foundation, Burns played a pivotal role in fundraising for the restoration of Marsh's Library at St. Patrick's Close in Dublin. He also founded the American Law Library at University College Cork in honor of his late father.

In an effort to expand the reach of the American Irish Foundation, Brian P. Burns spearheaded the merger of the American Irish Foundation and The Ireland Funds, founded by Dan Rooney of the Pittsburgh Steelers and Sir Anthony O'Reilly, the Irish-born chairman of Heinz. On St. Patrick's Day 1987, the two organizations merged at a White House ceremony to form The American Ireland Fund.

=== Awards ===
On March 21, 2013, Brian P. Burns was inducted into the Irish America Hall of Fame alongside former Vice-President (and now President) of the United States, Joe Biden. He was introduced at the ceremony by John L. Lahey, President of Quinnipiac University.

Burns received Palm Beach Atlantic University's American Free Enterprise medal on November 8, 2012.

In 2013, Burns was inducted as a member of The Order of St. Patrick, a prestigious award created by Heritage Publishing to honor major achievements of Irish Americans.

Burns was featured in Patricia Harty's 2000 book, The Greatest Irish Americans of the 20th Century, and named one of the top 100 Art Collectors by Arts and Antiques magazine in 1996.

Also in 1996, Burns received the Eire Society of Boston's Gold Medal award, an honor he shares with other well-known Irish and Irish-American figures, including the author Colm Tóibín and former President of Ireland Mary McAleese.

== Philanthropy ==
In 1986, Brian P. Burns and the Burns family founded The John J. Burns Library at Boston College. The Burns Library is the college's repository of rare books, special collections, and archives.

Through the Burns Foundation, Brian P. Burns established the Burns Visiting Scholar in Irish Studies Program in 1991. The program is a cooperative venture between the Boston College University Libraries and the Center for Irish Programs.

== Collection of Irish art ==
The focus of Brian P. Burns's collection of Irish art is, with few exceptions, works created after the Great Famine. The collection has been exhibited at museums and cultural institutions throughout the United States and Ireland, including exhibitions at the McMullen Museum of Art, Boston College, Dublin's Hugh Lane Gallery, the Yale Center for British Art in New Haven, Connecticut, the Kennedy Center in Washington, D.C., and the Phoenix Art Museum in Arizona. In 2014, the collection was exhibited at the Consulate General of Ireland, New York, in an exhibition curated by Turlough McConnell Communications.

Kate Robinson describes Burns's intention in collecting Irish art as a means "to become involved in the cultural development of his ancestral country and to correct the impression that we were a nation [Ireland] without a visual imagination."

== Personal life ==
Burns and his wife Eileen had eight children, four each from previous marriages, and fifteen grandchildren. Brian's four children were from his first marriage to Sheila O'Connor Burns.
