= Helene L. Kaplan =

American lawyer and nonprofit executive (1933–2023)

- Born: 1933
- Died: January 30, 2023 (aged 89–90)
- Education: Barnard College (BA); New York University (JD)
- Occupations: Lawyer, executive
- Employer: Skadden, Arps, Slate, Meagher & Flom
- Known for: Chairman of the Carnegie Corporation of New York
- Spouse: Mark N. Kaplan
- Children: 2

Helene Lois Kaplan (1933 – January 30, 2023) was an American lawyer and nonprofit executive. She was of counsel at Skadden, Arps, Slate, Meagher & Flom and was the first person to serve as two-time Chairman of the Carnegie Corporation of New York. She graduated from Barnard College in 1953 and New York University School of Law in 1967.

== Biography ==
Kaplan was born Helene Lois Finklestein. She graduated from Barnard College in 1953 and New York University School of Law in 1967. She was a student of sociologist Mirra Komarovsky at Barnard.

She was a partner of Webster & Sheffield before joining Skadden, Arps, Slate, Meagher & Flom in 1990. She retired from the practice of law in 2012.

She was named a director of the Carnegie Corporation of New York in 1980 and held the title of chair from 1985 to 1990. She also was elected vice-chair twice, serving in that capacity from 1981 to 1984 and from 1998 until 2002. She was elected chairman in 2002 and served until her retirement on March 1, 2007. She is one of the only two honorary trustees of the foundation, alongside Newton N. Minow.

In addition to her non-profit and legal careers, she was a trustee of Barnard College and served as the chairman of its board of trustees. She was also a trustee and chairman of Mount Sinai School of Medicine. She was also a trustee of the New York Foundation from 1976 to 1986, a former director of the Council on Foreign Relations from 1994 to 1996, a former trustee of the American Museum of Natural History, the Mitre Corporation, and the John Simon Guggenheim Memorial Foundation from 1981 to 1997. In 1990, she was elected a member of the American Academy of Arts and Sciences. She is a trustee emeriti of the Institute for Advanced Study, The Commonwealth Fund, and the J. Paul Getty Trust.

She has also served as a director of various companies, including ExxonMobil, MetLife, The May Department Stores Company, JPMorgan Chase and its predecessor Chemical Bank, and Verizon Communications.

From 1986 to 1990, she served as a member of the U.S. Secretary of State's Advisory Committee on South Africa.

Kaplan was awarded an honorary doctorate of laws from Columbia University in 1990 and an honorary doctorate of humane letters from Mount Sinai School of Medicine in 2001.

She was also one of the first women to be admitted to the Century Association in 1988, along with Jacqueline Kennedy Onassis and Brooke Astor.

== Personal life and family ==
Kaplan was married to fellow Skadden lawyer Mark N. Kaplan and the couple had two children.
