= Sharon Johnson Coleman =

American judge (born 1960)

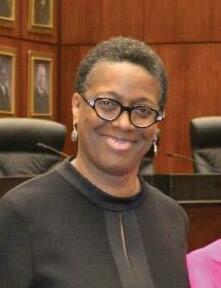
- Coleman in 2019

Judge of the United States District Court for the Northern District of Illinois
- Incumbent
- Assumed office July 13, 2010
- Appointed by: Barack Obama
- Preceded by: Mark Filip

Personal details
- Born: Sharon Lynn Johnson; July 19, 1960 (age 65) Chicago, Illinois, U.S.
- Education: Northern Illinois University (BA); Washington University in St. Louis (JD)

Sharon Lynn Johnson Coleman (born July 19, 1960) is a United States district judge of the United States District Court for the Northern District of Illinois. She was formerly a justice of the Illinois Appellate Court, First District, 3rd Division.

== Early life and education ==
Coleman was born in Chicago and graduated from Northern Illinois University in 1981 with a Bachelor of Arts in History. She went on to receive her Juris Doctor degree in 1984 from Washington University School of Law.

== Career ==
After law school, Coleman was an Assistant State’s Attorney in the Cook County State's Attorney's office from 1984 until 1989. From 1989 to 1993, Coleman served as an Assistant United States Attorney in the Northern District of Illinois. Between 1993 and 1996, she held the position of Deputy State’s Attorney and Bureau Chief for the Public Interest Bureau of the Cook County State’s Attorney’s Office. From 1996 until 2008, Coleman served as a judge on the Cook County Circuit Court, where she worked in the child protection division and the law division. She sat on the Illinois Appellate Court in Chicago, a position she held from 2008 to 2010.

=== Federal judicial service ===
On February 24, 2010, President Barack Obama nominated Coleman to fill the seat on the United States District Court for the Northern District of Illinois that had been vacated by Mark Filip, who resigned in 2008 to become United States Deputy Attorney General. She was one of several recommendations for the seat from Senator Dick Durbin. On July 12, 2010, the United States Senate confirmed Coleman by an 86–0 vote. She received her commission on July 13, 2010.

== Notable cases ==
Coleman has presided over a number of high-profile cases. Among those are a ruling that enabled same sex couples to marry in February 2014 in advance of the June 2014 effective date for same sex marriages in Illinois.

During a patent infringement case revolving around electronic trading software patents in 2011, Coleman granted default judgment to Chicago-based Trading Technologies International Inc. after Rosenthal Collins and Trading Technologies counter-sued each other and litigated for nearly six years. Coleman also ordered sanctions against Rosenthal Collins after finding that a company witness had wiped computer disks that allegedly contained evidence relevant to the case and misrepresented his actions to the court.

In 2015, Coleman sentenced former state Representative Derrick Smith to five months in prison for a bribery conviction. Smith also was ordered to serve a year of supervised release and complete 360 hours of community service.

In March 2024, Coleman ruled that a federal statute, 18 U.S.C. 922(g)(5), which prohibits aliens who are either illegally or unlawfully in the United States or admitted to the United States under a nonimmigrant visa (the latter class has some exceptions listed at 18 U.S.C. 922(y)(2)) from possessing firearms was facially constitutional, but unconstitutional as applied to the defendant in United States v. Carbajal-Flores. Coleman previously denied the defendant's motion to dismiss on two separate occasions, but reconsidered her previous denials after the United States Supreme Court's new test for gun restrictions in New York State Rifle & Pistol Association v. Bruen, was clarified by the Seventh Circuit Court of Appeals in Atkinson v. Garland. The decision was also based on United States v. Meza-Rodriguez, in which the Seventh Circuit held that the Second Amendment applies in some circumstances to unauthorized noncitizens. Coleman's ruling did not strike down the noncitizen-in-possession statute, but instead invalidated one provision as it was applied to the specific defendant in Carbajal-Flores. However, her ruling was reported as holding that "illegal migrants can carry guns." In United States v. Sing Ledezman, decided before Coleman's Carbajal-Flores ruling, a Texas federal judge applied Bruen and found the same noncitizen-in-possession statute facially unconstitutional.

Coleman previously criticized the Supreme Court's Bruen test in United States v. Griffin, stating, "This Court is disheartened by the Supreme Court's decision to rely on an analysis of laws that existed at this nation's founding to determine the constitutionality of modern gun regulations. Indeed, to interpret modern regulations pertaining to the critically important Second Amendment right to bear firearms for self-defense, the Supreme Court requires that this Court rely on a history and tradition of a nation that at the time would have regarded individuals, including Griffin and this Judge, as three-fifths of a person at best and property at worst. As demonstrated below, the Bruen test causes the government to make uncomfortable arguments to justify the constitutionality of modern gun regulations. Regrettably, this Court must acknowledge that Breun is the law."

== Personal ==
Coleman and her husband, Wheeler Coleman, live in Chicago.

== See also ==
- List of African-American federal judges
- List of African-American jurists

Legal offices
| Preceded by Mark Filip | Judge of the United States District Court for the Northern District of Illinois; 2010–present | Incumbent |
