= Jester of Columbia =

Humor magazine at Columbia University

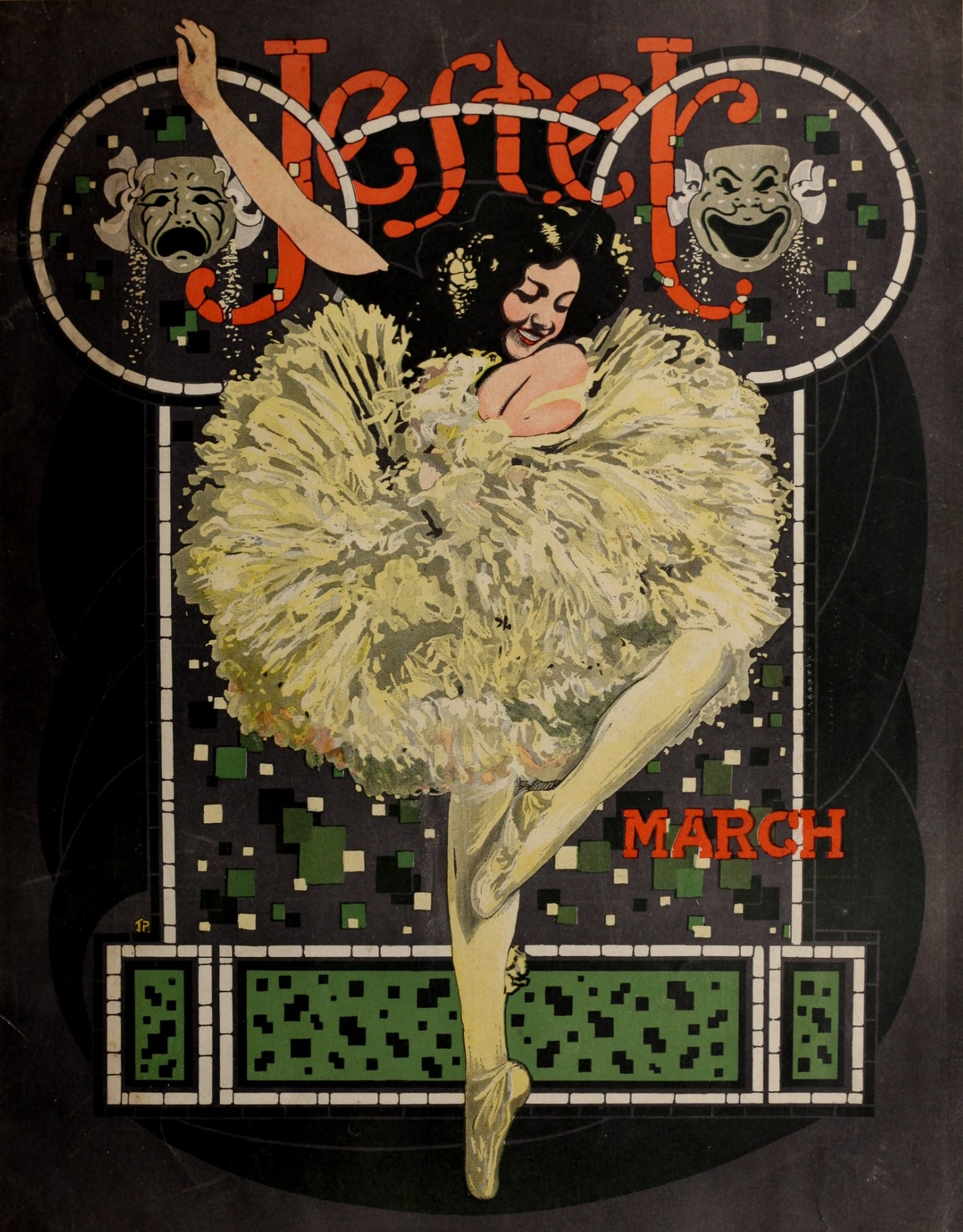
- Cover of the March 1912 issue of The Jester
- Editor: Eric Donahue
- Categories: Humor magazine
- Frequency: Up to 4 per year
- First issue: April 1, 1901
- Country: United States
- Language: American English
- Website: https://columbiajester.wordpress.com

The Jester of Columbia, or simply the Jester, is a humor magazine at Columbia University in New York City. Founded on April Fool's Day, 1901, it is one of the oldest such publications in the United States. Printed continuously at least through 1997, it was revived in 2001 after a short lapse in publication and again in 2005 after another, shorter one. Jester now produces magazines and sponsors comedy events on Columbia's campus.

== Issues ==
Excluding brief lapses in publication, the Jester has always produced issues. Jester publishes four or five times per year, with articles loosely centered around a broad theme. Issues contain a wide array of articles and jokes, such as narratives, dialogues, and articles composed of short paragraphs discussing a theme. To heighten the effect of period pieces or specific jokes, articles appear as fake documents found and scanned into the issue. Illustrations are a significant part of the magazine, with visual gags and fake ads bringing greater variety.

Jester attempts to not repeat jokes or features, except for a letters to the editor section, an editorial, called the "Editaurus," an obituary section succinctly named "Deaths," and a couple of "list" pages containing short jokes and lists. However, there are no recurring subjects, and news-style pieces rarely appear, except as "sampled" documents. Within individual issues, there are also recurring references, including ones regarding Picabo Street, the Zune, and Q-Zar.

== Other activities ==
In addition to publishing the magazine, the group puts on comedy events, containing sketches, improv comedy, and an event reminiscent of the antics of Andy Kaufman, where an audience was forced to watch other students eat dinner for 30 minutes while listening to madrigals.

Jester also performs a number of pranks, most recently establishing a pseudo-rivalry with the Columbia Undergraduate Science Journal, culminating in a staged theft of issues, attached rebuttals, and a parody website. The Columbia Spectator reported the event as an actual disappearance.

== Alumni ==
- Arnold Beichman, anti-communist polemicist
- Bennett Cerf, co-founder of Random House
- Paul Gewirtz, law school professor, editor in 1966–67
- Allen Ginsberg, poet of the Beat Generation
- Gerald Green, writer
- Judd Gregg, politician and lawyer
- Rockwell Kent, artist, in 1903 became the Jester's first Art Editor
- Ed Koren, New Yorker cartoonist
- Tony Kushner, playwright
- Robert Lax, poet
- Joseph L. Mankiewicz, screenwriter
- Thomas Merton, author and monk
- Cliff Montgomery, football player
- Robert Pollack, professor of biological sciences
- Ted Rall, political cartoonist
- Ad Reinhardt, artist
- Ed Rice, journalist
- David Rosand, art professor
- Bernard Shir-Cliff, editor
- John Slate, aviation lawyer
- Ralph de Toledano, journalist, co-founded the National Review and edited Newsweek
- Lynd Ward, artist
- Gerald Weissmann, essayist and medical scientist
- Herman Wouk, writer
