= Mark N. Kaplan =

American lawyer and business executive

- Education: Columbia University (BA, LLB)
- Occupations: investment banker, executive, lawyer
- Employer: Skadden, Arps, Slate, Meagher & Flom
- Known for: CEO of Drexel Burnham Lambert and Engelhard
- Spouse: Helene L. Kaplan

Mark N. Kaplan is an American lawyer and business executive who is the former CEO of Drexel Burnham Lambert and senior partner at Skadden, Arps, Slate, Meagher & Flom LLP and Affiliates.

== Education ==
Kaplan graduated from Columbia College in 1951 and Columbia Law School in 1953.

== Professional career ==
Kaplan was a lawyer at Marshall, Bratter who headed its corporate department and was considered a potential leader before joining the investment bank, Burnham and Company. Kaplan then served the president and CEO of its various incarnations before becoming Drexel Burnham Lambert from 1970 to 1977, replacing I. W. "Tubby" Burnham, the firm's founder in that capacity while Burnham remained its chairman. In 1977, he left the company to become president and CEO of Engelhard, a former Fortune 500 company. He spent two years at the company before joining Skadden, Arps, Slate, Meagher & Flom LLP, where he served as a senior partner until 1998. He also served as a director of DRS Technologies and represented the firm in its acquisition by Leonardo S.p.A.

== Awards and honors ==
In 1979, he was a member of the first class of Columbia College's John Jay Award presented to its alumni for distinguished professional achievement, along with ABC News President Roone P. Arledge, NASA Administrator James C. Fletcher, New York Times executive editor Max Frankel, New York State Comptroller Arthur Levitt Sr., and Ford Foundation CEO Franklin A. Thomas He is also member of the American Academy of Arts and Sciences, elected in 2010.

== Philanthropy ==
Kaplan currently serves on the board of the Institute of International Education and the New York Academy of Medicine.

== Personal life ==
He is married to Helene L. Kaplan, a Skadden lawyer and Barnard College graduate who served as the chair of the Carnegie Corporation of New York from 1985 to 1990, and from 2002 to 2007.
