= Craig S. Morford =

American attorney

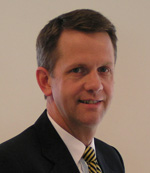

United States Deputy Attorney General
- Acting
- In office July 26, 2007 – March 10, 2008
- President: George W. Bush
- Preceded by: Paul McNulty
- Succeeded by: Mark Filip

Personal details
- Born: February 10, 1959 (age 67)
- Education: Hope College (BA); Valparaiso University (JD)

Craig S. Morford (born February 10, 1959) is an American attorney and former acting United States Deputy Attorney General.

== Early life and education ==
Craig Morford grew up in Schenectady, New York graduated in 1981 with an Economics degree from Hope College. He was a member of the Cosmopolitan Fraternity. He graduated from Valparaiso University School of Law in Indiana in 1984.

== Career ==
Morford spent most of his career as a federal prosecutor pursuing public-corruption and organized crime cases in Cleveland, Ohio.

As an Internal Revenue Service attorney, he helped win a civil tax evasion judgment in 1987 against James Traficant, elected to Congress in 1984, for failing to pay taxes on $163,000 received from mob figures. Traficant had been acquitted on related criminal charges.

After joining the Justice Department's Organized Crime Strike Force in Cleveland, Morford helped convict the nation's largest pornography distributor, Reuben Sturman, on tax evasion charges in 1990.

From 1996 to 2002, Morford prosecuted more than 70 cases resulting in the convictions of elected officials, law enforcement officers and mob figures in northern Ohio. Those convicted included three county judges, Mahoning County Prosecutor James A. Philomena, Mahoning County Sheriff Philip Chance, and Youngstown mob boss Lenine "Lennie" Strollo, along with 28 associates.

In 2002, Morford was lead prosecutor in the second criminal case against Traficant, then in his ninth term as a Democratic Congress member from Youngstown, Ohio. Traficant was convicted on charges of bribery, racketeering and tax evasion and sentenced to eight years in prison.

In 2004, Morford led a court-ordered Justice Department review of allegations of prosecutorial misconduct in a major terrorism case that followed the attacks of September 11, 2001. Morford's report concluded that prosecutors had improperly withheld evidence – e-mails, photographs, witness statements and other material – that cast doubt on the government's case. In a rare admission of error, the Justice Department asked a judge to dismiss charges against two convicted defendants.

In 2006, Morford led a task force that prosecuted Toledo coin dealer Tom Noe, a Republican fundraiser convicted of stealing from a rare-coin fund that he managed for the Ohio Bureau of Workers' Compensation. Then-Ohio Gov. Bob Taft, a Republican, pleaded guilty in a separate state case to misdemeanor ethics charges for accepting gifts from Noe.

Morford served briefly as U.S. Attorney in Detroit and Nashville. He was named acting Deputy Attorney General, the No. 2 position in the Justice Department, in July 2007, and mentioned as a possible nominee for Attorney General.

While acting Deputy Attorney General, Morford wrote what is referred to as the "Morford Memo" establishing new guidelines for how federal prosecutors select and use compliance monitors in corporate crime settlements. The department had previously been criticized when then-U.S. Attorney Chris Christie required a company to name former Attorney General John Ashcroft to a lucrative monitoring contract.

In May, 2008, Morford joined Cardinal Health, a large healthcare services company in Dublin, Ohio, where he served as Chief Legal and Compliance Officer, overseeing legal, compliance, regulatory and government affairs. Morford retired from Cardinal Health in 2019 and joined ExxonMobil, where he served as General Counsel and Corporate Secretary until his retirement in July 2024. In 2025, Morford rejoined the RPM International Board of Directors, where he had previously served as a director from 2013 to 2019 before joining ExxonMobil.

Legal offices
Preceded by Paul McNulty	U.S. Deputy Attorney General; Served under: George W. Bush; 2007–2008 (Acting)	Succeeded by Mark Filip
