= Manly Fleischmann =

American lawyer

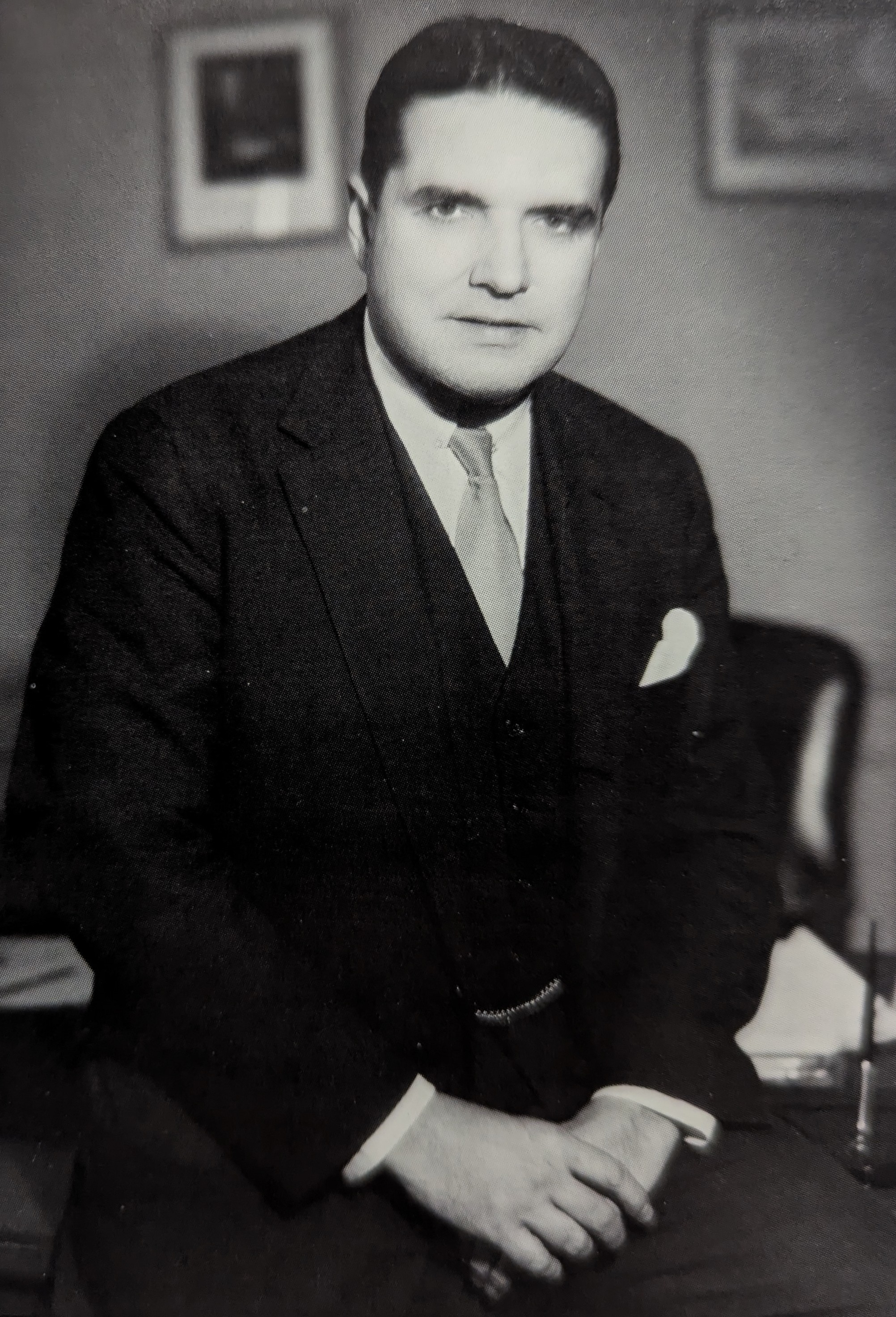
- Manly Fleischmann in His New York Law Office c. 1955
- Born: July 15, 1908; Hamburg, New York
- Died: March 25, 1987 (aged 78); Buffalo, New York
- Occupation: Attorney

Manly Fleischmann (1908-1987) was an attorney whose record of public service included positions in the Democratic Administration of Harry S Truman and in the Republican Administration of New York Governor Nelson Rockefeller. He served as President Truman's Defense Production Administrator for the Korean War. At the request of Gov. Rockefeller, he chaired the New York State Commission on the Quality, Cost and Financing of Elementary and Secondary Education (known as "The Fleischmann Commission").

== Early life ==
Manly Fleischmann was born July 15, 1908, in Hamburg, New York (a suburb of Buffalo) to a prominent Buffalo trial lawyer, Simon Fleischmann. The family had ties to both Judaism and Quakerism. The Fleischmann boys—of whom there were six (no daughters)-- remembered of their childhood that a Quaker idiom (that is, use of 'thee' and 'thou') was the household vernacular when they were growing up. Manly Fleischmann never practiced Judaism, however; instead, he and his future wife, Lois, worshiped and raised their family in the Episcopal Church.

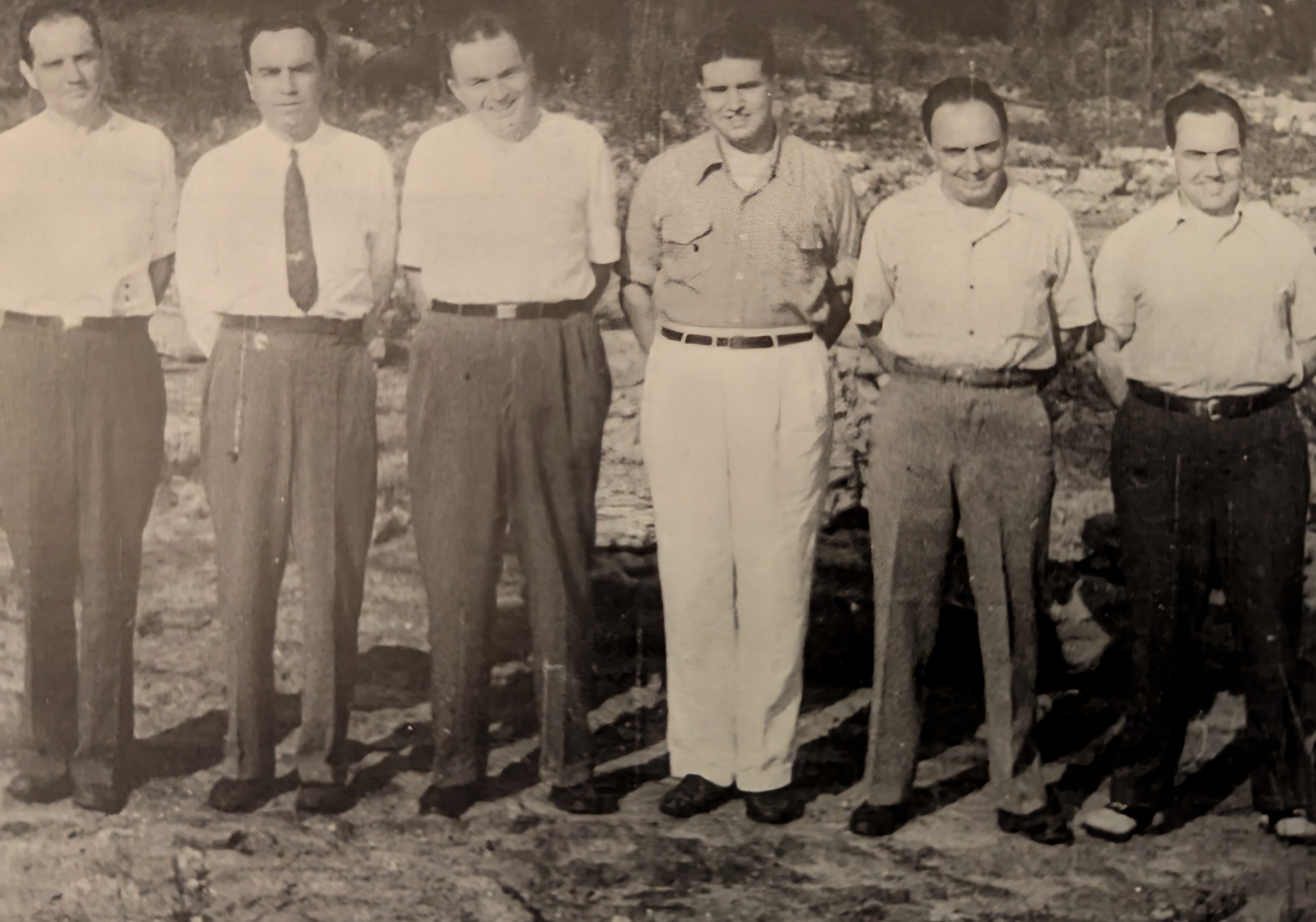
Manly Fleischmann (3rd from right) and His Brothers

Fleischmann received his undergraduate training at Harvard College, graduating in 1929 and took his law degree at the University of Buffalo in 1933.

== War and Public Service ==
Buffalo native John Lord O'Brian, a friend of Simon Fleischmann, was General Counsel to President Franklin D. Roosevelt's War Production Board during World War II. He named Manly Fleischmann his Assistant General Counsel. Fleischmann remained in this post until 1943, when he joined the Office of Strategic Services (OSS, predecessor of the present Central Intelligence Agency), serving as a united States Navy officer detached to a British Army unit involved in espionage in Japanese-occupied Burma. For his service, he was later decorated by both the U.S. and Thai governments.

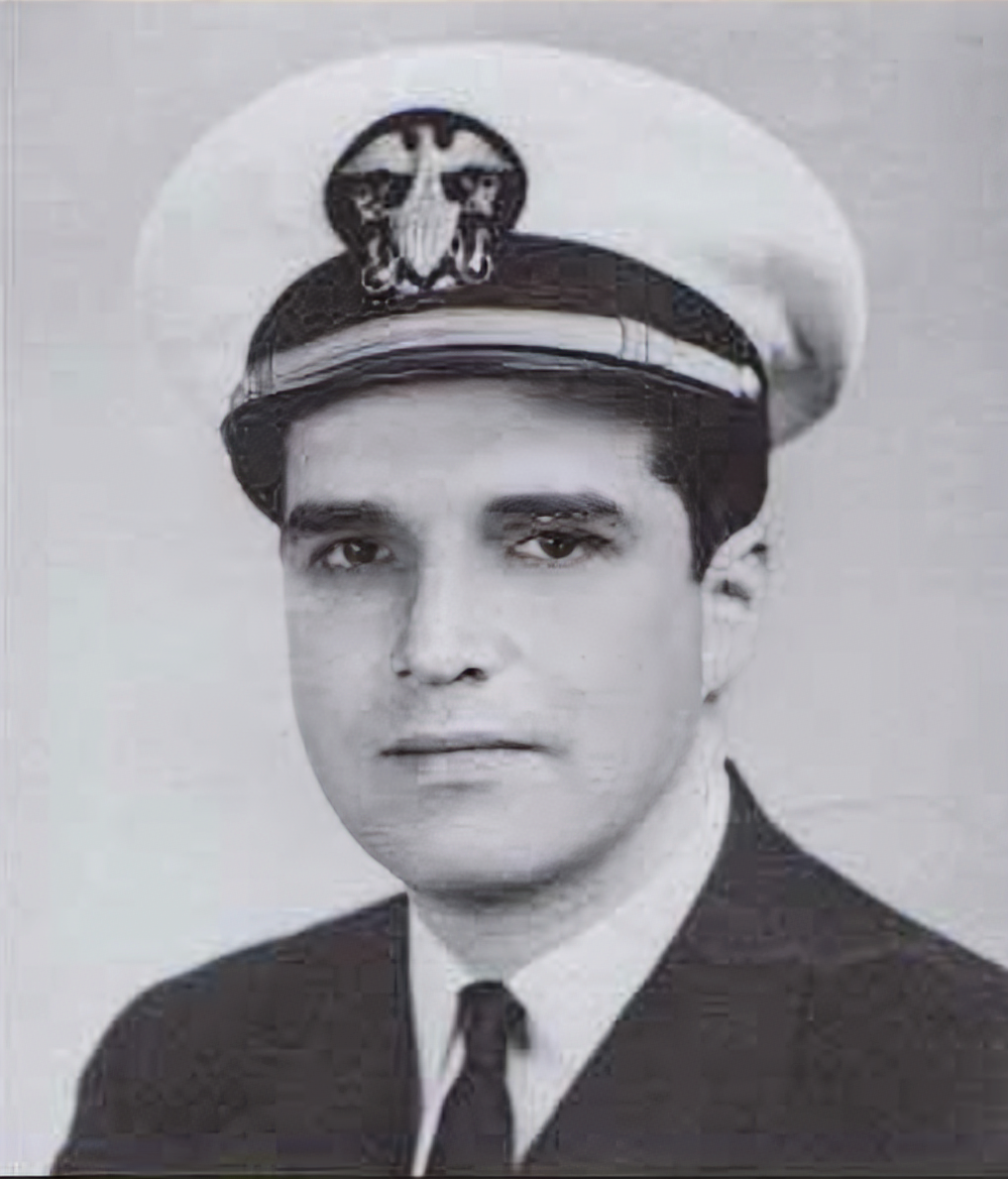
Lt. Manly Fleischmann WWII

At the War's end, Fleischmann returned to Buffalo and founded a private law practice, Fleischmann Brothers, with his brother, Adelbert (1912-2008). However, with the advent of the Korean War, in 1950, he returned to Washington as General Counsel to the War Production Board.

In 1951, President Truman appointed him Defense Production Administrator and National Production Administrator, positions in which Fleischmann balanced war production with maintaining a domestic economy. He also served as U.S. Chairman of the International Materials Conference.

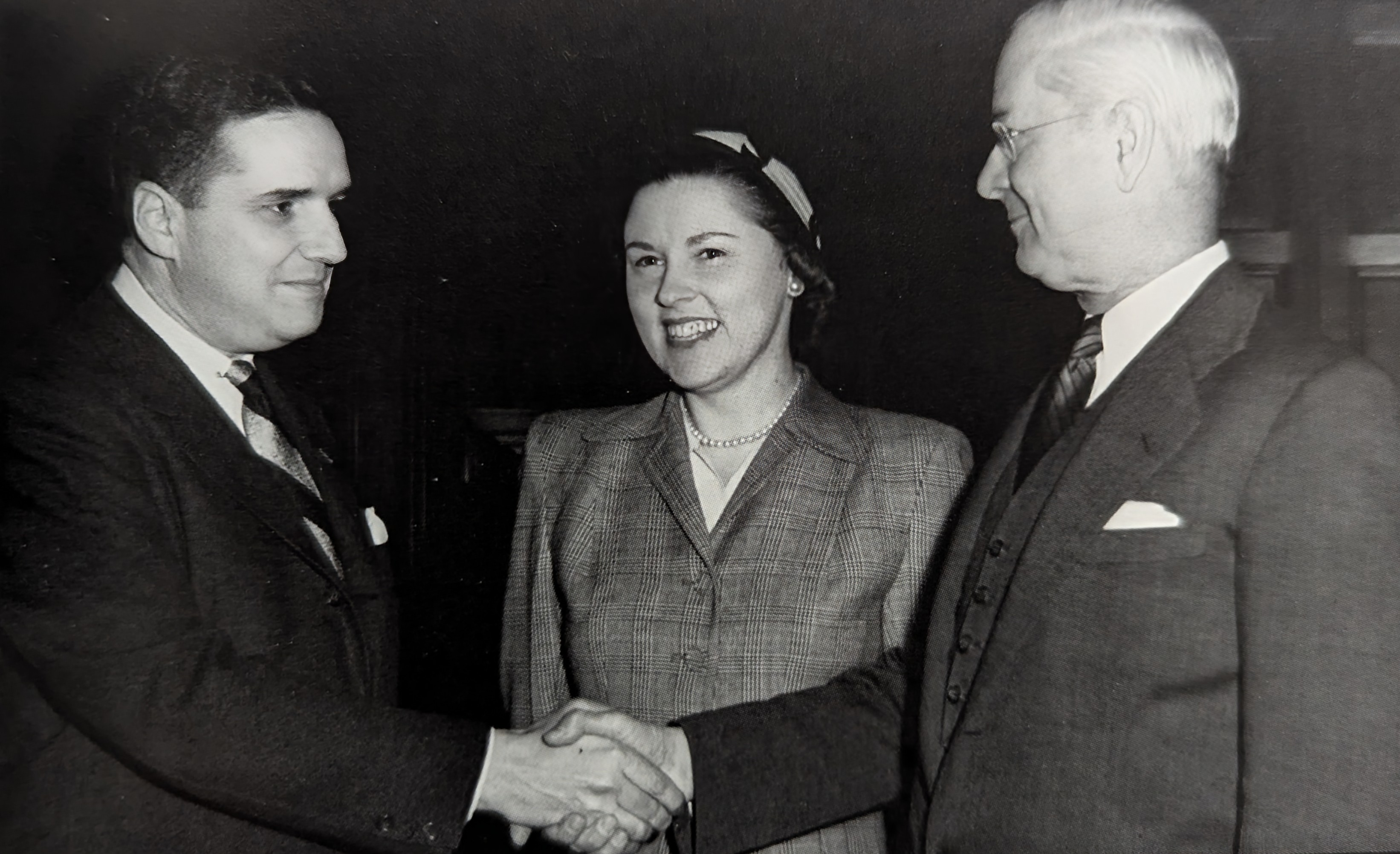
U.S. Secretary of Commerce Charles Sawyer swearing in Fleischmann as Head of the War Production Administration, 1951

As Korean War Production Administrator, Fleischmann was described as "...the man who exercises the greatest control over the [American] economy in peacetime history." The author, Robert J. Donovan, said Fleischmann "...is representative of the rare type of government executive whose judgment is unfettered by political loyalties and whose decisions are unhampered by past ties with business, labor, or other big interests." The magazine concluded that, "[a]t the age of forty-three Fleischmann is looked upon as one of the ablest administrators in Washington, at a time when Washington sorely needs competent administrators."

President Truman later sent Fleischmann to Europe as one of his representatives in discussions that would lead to the creation of the North Atlantic Treaty Organization (NATO).

After the Korean War, in 1952, Fleischmann, who had turned down President Truman's offer of the Ambassadorship to Indonesia, returned to private law practice. He was a founding partner of two major firms: Webster, Sheffield, Fleischmann, Hitchcock, & Chrystie in New York City, and Jaeckle, Fleischmann, Kelly, Swart, & Augspurger in Buffalo: the former evolved into Webster & Sheffield, which formed in 1934 dissolved in 1991; the latter, in partnership with powerful Republican political leader Edwin Jaeckle, into Jaeckle, Fleischmann & Mugel, which was perhaps the most stellar name in the Western New York legal firmament for decades. Jaeckle, Fleischmann & Mugel announced on September 30, 2015, that, as of January 1, 2016, it would cease to exist. The remnants of the partnership were joined into a Syracuse, N.Y.-based firm and, in a move that stunned observers of the legal profession, the iconic Jaeckle Fleischmann name was not retained.

In 1965 Gov. Nelson Rockefeller appointed Fleischmann Trustee of the State University of New York.

== The Fleischmann Commission ==
In 1969, New York Gov. Nelson Rockefeller appointed Fleischmann to head a state commission to study the quality, cost and financing of public education.

In 1972, Fleischmann issued his report (Viking Press 1972). It stunned the educational establishment by: proposing busing to end racial segregation; opposing most state aid to non-public schools; and proposing a state takeover of all public elementary and secondary school costs to be financed by a state tax on real property.

Fleischmann suffered a stroke that debilitated him during the final decade of his life. He died March 25, 1987, at Buffalo in a fall at his home after suffering a heart attack. He is interred in the crypt of St. Paul's Episcopal Cathedral at Buffalo.
