= Skadden, Arps, Slate, Meagher & Flom =

American multinational law firm

- Headquarters: One Manhattan West; New York City; United States
- No. of offices: 21
- No. of attorneys: 1,774
- Major practice areas: Transactions, litigation/controversy and regulatory
- Key people: Jeremy D. London (executive partner); Noah J. Puntus (executive director/CFO)
- Revenue: US$3.4 billion (2024)
- Profit per equity partner: US$6.0 million (2024)
- Date founded: April 1, 1948; 78 years ago
- Company type: Limited liability partnership
- Website: skadden.com
- ASN: 25844

Skadden, Arps, Slate, Meagher (Note: Meagher is pronounced MAR.) & Flom LLP and Affiliates (known as Skadden) is an American multinational law firm headquartered in New York City. The firm comprises approximately 1,800 lawyers.

== History ==
The firm was founded in 1948 in New York by Marshall Skadden, John Slate, and Les Arps. The same year, Joseph Flom was hired as the firm's first associate. In 1959, William R. Meagher joined the firm and its first female attorney, Elizabeth Head, was hired. In 1960, the firm's name became Skadden, Arps, Slate, Meagher & Flom.

In 1973, the firm opened its second office in Boston. In 1981, Peggy L. Kerr became the first woman to become a partner at Skadden. In 1987, the firm opened its first international office in Tokyo.

In November 2023, amid a wave of antisemitic incidents at elite U.S. law schools, Skadden, Arps, Slate, Meagher & Flom was among a group of major law firms that sent a letter to top law school deans warning them that an escalation in incidents targeting Jewish students would have corporate hiring consequences.

=== Agreement to support Trump administration (2025) ===
In March 2025, the firm came to an agreement with the Trump administration to contribute $100 million of pro bono legal services to support the goals of the second Trump administration. The move was widely criticized. In July 2026, the Department of Justice subpoenaed Skadden in an investigation of the deal.

In July 2026, Representative Jaime Raskin, and Senators Adam Schiff and Richard Blumenthal (who serves as ranking member of the Permanent Subcommittee on Investigations) requested by letter that the firm submit details of its government work, in light of its March 2025 agreement with the Trump administration, and to explain its apparent conflict of interest in advising Intel while the Trump administration acquired 10% equity in the company.

== Key people ==
The firm has 334 partners worldwide. Notable partners include:

- Patrick B. Fitzgerald, former U.S. attorney for the Northern District of Illinois; as special counsel for the Department of Justice, the federal prosecutor in charge of the investigation of the Valerie Plame Affair
- Fred T. Goldberg, Jr., commissioner of Internal Revenue (1989–92), assistant secretary for tax policy in the Department of the Treasury in 1992
- Mark N. Kaplan, former CEO of Drexel Burnham Lambert and Engelhard
- Michael Leiter, former director of the National Counterterrorism Center
- Stephen C. Robinson, former federal district court judge sitting in the U.S. District Court for the SDNY; former U.S. attorney for the District of Connecticut

== Rankings ==
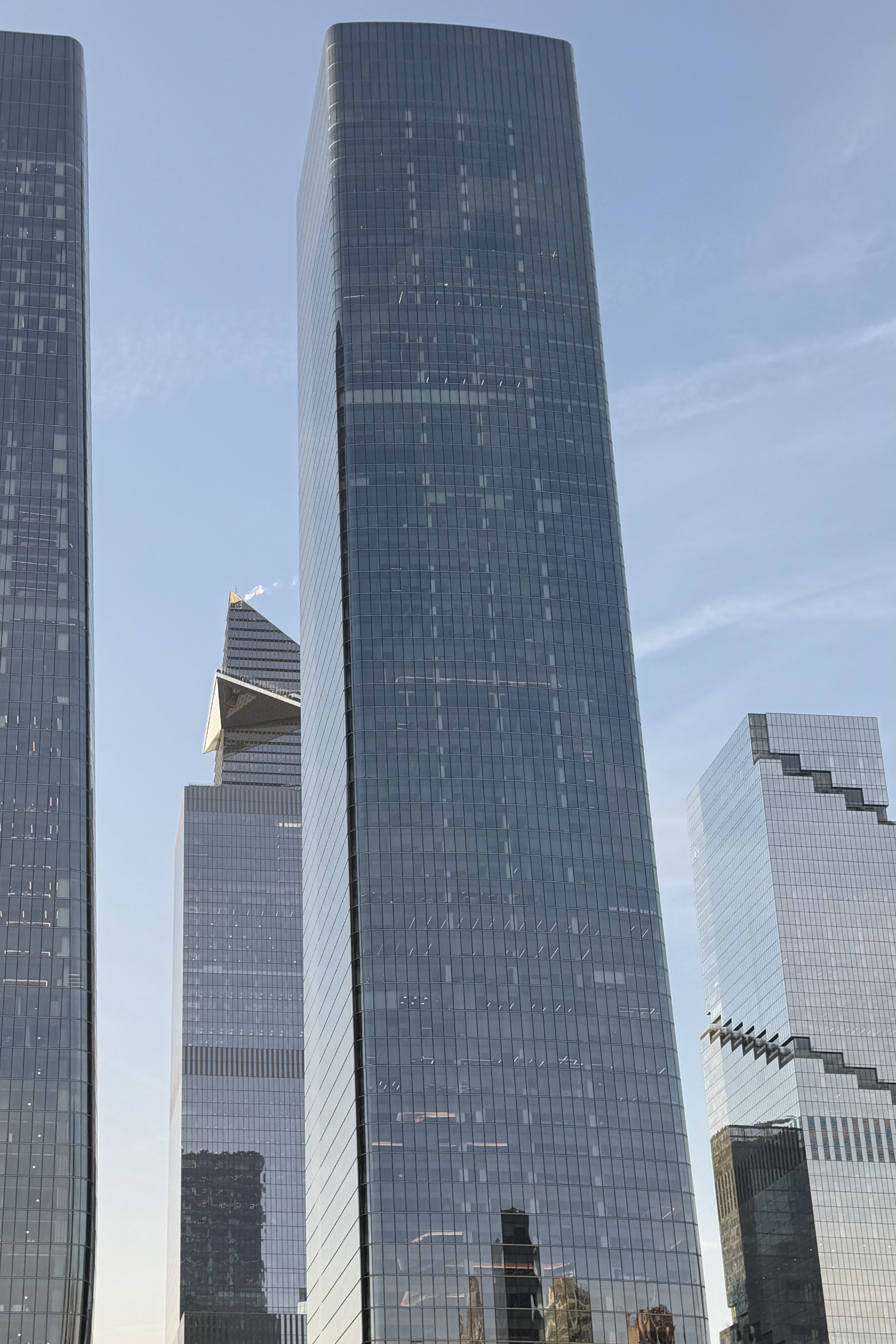
Skadden's New York City headquarters at One Manhattan West

In 2015 and 2016, Skadden was the fourth-largest law firm in the U.S. by revenue. In the 2015 Global 100 survey by The American Lawyer, it ranked as the fourth-highest grossing law firm in the world. In 2016, the firm had approximately 1,700 attorneys in 22 offices.

In 2016, Skadden was 187th on Forbes' list of America's Largest Private Companies by revenue. In 2015, it became the first law firm to ever handle more than $1 trillion in M&A deals in a single year and, for the third time in six years, the Financial Times' "Innovative Lawyers" report named Skadden the most innovative law firm in North America.

In 2025, the firm was ranked fifth-largest in the world by revenue, and fifteenth-largest by number of attorneys, with nearly 1800 on its roster.

== Other work ==
=== Russia and Ukraine ===
Skadden has a history of representing clients with ties to the Vladimir Putin regime in Russia, such as Alfa Bank, Roman Abramovich, and to Viktor F. Yanukovych's pro-Russian regime in Ukraine. In 2020, the firm paid a $4.6 million settlement for misleading U.S. authorities regarding its lobbying on behalf of a Russia-aligned Ukrainian government.

In 2012, Skadden began representing Viktor F. Yanukovych, a pro-Russian president of Ukraine, from 2010 to 2014. Paul Manafort had helped to arrange for the hiring of the firm. One of the firm's actions on Yanukovych's behalf was to produce a report justifying his imprisonment of former prime minister Yulia V. Tymoshenko, a pro-European, and denying that the action had been a political prosecution, although many Western countries characterized it as such. Later that year, a team of American lawyers commissioned by the government of Ukraine concluded that Tymoshenko's trial had not been fair and her rights had been violated.

After Yanukovych lost power in Euromaidan and fled to Russia, Skadden's work on his behalf led to several federal investigations. Firm attorney Alex van der Zwaan was convicted of lying to the FBI about his work on Yanukovych's behalf and served 30 days in jail. In 2019, firm lawyer Gregory B. Craig was indicted on charges of lying to federal prosecutors about the work he did at Skadden on behalf of the Yanukovych, but was acquitted in a jury trial.

Tymoshenko made plans to sue Skadden, and in May 2020 it was revealed that the firm had paid at least $11 million to settle the case before a lawsuit could be filed.

Skadden, along with Mercury Public Affairs and the Podesta Group, was investigated by the U.S. attorney's office for the Southern District of New York (SDNY) for possible lobbying violations regarding former Trump campaign chairman Paul Manafort. In 2019, Skadden agreed to pay a $4.6 million settlement to the Department of Justice over the firm's failure to register as a foreign agent under the Foreign Agent Registrations Act.

Skadden has been involved in representing Russian groups in corporate deals worth around $90 billion. Skadden has represented Alfa Bank, a Russian bank closely associated with Russian oligarchs and the Vladimir Putin regime. After Russia invaded Ukraine in 2022 and amid heavy sanctions against Alfa Bank, Skadden said it was "in the process of ending our representations of Alfa Bank." Skadden has a long-standing relationship with Russian oligarch Roman Abramovich – Skadden refused to say whether it still represented him in 2022.

=== Political contributions ===
As a group, Skadden partners and employees have historically contributed far more to Democratic political candidates than to Republicans.

== Notable relationships with the firm ==
- Amelia Boone, obstacle racer, 2012 Spartan Race World Champion and three-time Tough Mudder champion
- Bruce M. Buck, chairman of Chelsea Football Club
- Gregory B. Craig, former White House counsel to President Barack Obama
- William Daly, Deputy Commissioner, National Hockey League
- George B. Daniels, judge, U.S. District Court for the Southern District of New York (2000–)
- Robert Del Tufo, former New Jersey attorney general and U.S. attorney for the District of New Jersey
- John Feerick, former dean of Fordham University School of Law
- Joseph Flom, name-partner
- Chip Flowers, first African-American elected official in Delaware (state treasurer) and co-chair, National Democratic State Treasurers (2010–2014)
- Greg Giraldo, comedian
- Keith Gottfried, general counsel for the U.S. Department of Housing and Urban Development (2005–09)
- Jamieson Greer, trade official under President Donald Trump
- Natasha Hausdorff, British barrister, international news commentator, and Israel advocate
- Laura Ingraham, Fox News anchor and host of The Ingraham Angle
- Merit Janow, American academic, former dean of School of International and Public Affairs, Columbia University
- Helene L. Kaplan, former chairman of the Carnegie Corporation of New York
- Mark N. Kaplan, former CEO of Drexel Burnham Lambert from 1970 to 1977 and CEO of Engelhard
- Judge Judith S. Kaye, longest-tenured chief judge of the New York Court of Appeals, serving 1993–2008
- Robert Lighthizer, former United States trade representative (2017–21)
- Finbarr O'Neill, former CEO of J.D. Power, Hyundai Motor America and Mitsubishi Motors North America
- Robert S. Pirie, co-chairman and CEO of Rothschild, North America, senior managing director of Bear Stearns & Co., and vice-chairman of Investment Banking at SG Cowen Securities Corporation
- Douglas Rediker, executive chairman of International Capital Strategies; former U.S. alternate executive director, International Monetary Fund (2010–2012)
- Irving S. Shapiro, former CEO, DuPont
- Isaac Shapiro, former president, Japan Society
- John Slate, name partner
- Mary L. Smith, principal deputy director and acting agency head of Indian Health Service; former official, United States Department of Justice Civil Division; former nominee, assistant attorney general, United States Department of Justice, Tax Division
- Leo Strine, chief justice of the Delaware Supreme Court (2014–2019); previously chancellor (2011–2014) and vice-chancellor (1998–2011) of the Delaware Court of Chancery
- Robert W. Sweet, judge, U.S. District Court for the Southern District of New York (1978–1991, senior status 1991–2019)
- William H. Timbers, former judge, U.S. Court of Appeals for the Second Circuit (1971–1981, senior status 1981–1994); chief judge (1964–1971), judge (1960–1971), U.S. District Court for the District of Connecticut
- Alex van der Zwaan, attorney, charged with lying to federal investigators about his interactions with Rick Gates in an investigation in Russian interference in the 2016 United States elections.
- Stephen Vaughn, former acting United States trade representative (USTR) and USTR general counsel
- Harold M. Williams, former chair, Securities and Exchange Commission (1977–1981)

== See also ==
- Russian interference in the 2016 United States elections
