= William R. Meagher =

American lawyer

William R. Meagher (1903–1981) was a senior partner with the New York law firm Skadden, Arps, Slate, Meagher & Flom, one of the largest and highest-grossing law firms in the world. Meagher, a trial and appellate lawyer, served as senior partner from 1968 to 1974, and continued working with the firm until his death in 1981. Meagher was graduate of Fordham University.
