= Webster & Sheffield =

- Headquarters: New York City
- No. of attorneys: 135 (1988)
- Key people: Bethuel M. Webster; John Lindsay; Michael Mukasey; Manly Fleischmann
- Date founded: 1934
- Founder: Bethuel M. Webster, Frederick Sheffield, Manly Fleischmann, and two other partners.
- Dissolved: 1991

Webster & Sheffield, formerly Webster, Sheffield, Fleischmann, Hitchcock & Chrystie, was a major "white shoe" law firm in New York City from 1934 to 1991. The firm concentrated on corporate and securities law, litigation, real estate, and municipal bonds.

== History ==
In 1934, Bethuel M. Webster, later President of the City Bar Association of New York, founded the law firm of Webster, Sheffield, Fleischmann, Hitchcock & Chrystie with Frederick Sheffield, which ultimately grew into Webster & Sheffield. Manly Fleischmann was also a founding partner of the firm.

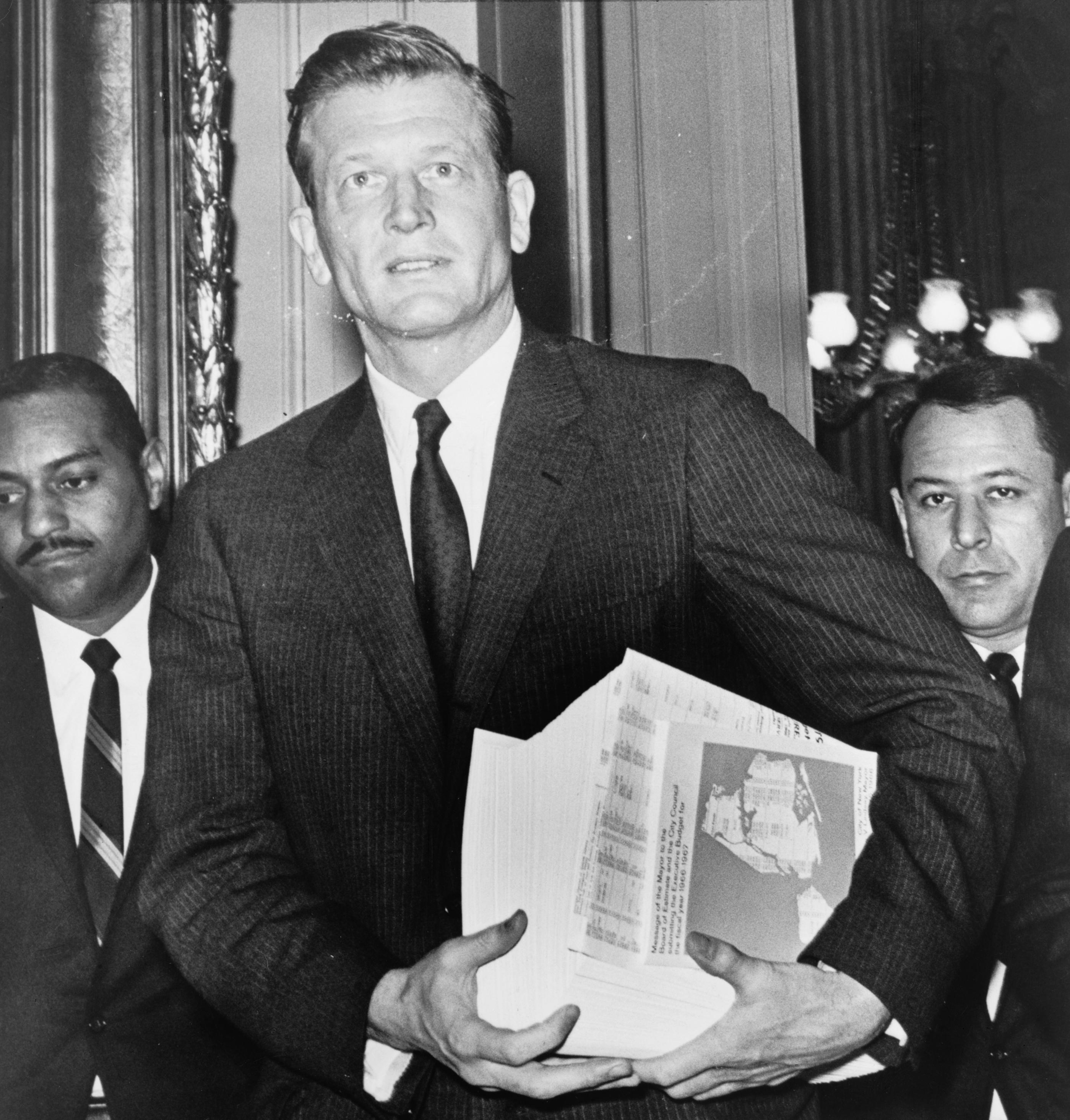
John Lindsay

John Lindsay, who in 1949 began his legal career at the law firm as an associate, became a partner at the firm in the record time of under four years. Lindsay left the firm to run for a seat in the U. S. House of Representatives in 1958; after serving four terms in Congress and two terms as Mayor of New York City, Lindsay returned to the firm in 1974 through its dissolution in 1991 as a partner in its Public Finance Department.

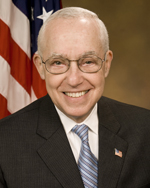
Michael Mukasey

Brian P. Burns, an entrepreneur, attorney, and philanthropist, began his career as an associate at the firm in 1960–64. From 1967 to 1972, Michael Mukasey, who later served for 18 years as a US District Judge of the US District Court for the Southern District of New York, six of those years as Chief Judge, and as the 81st Attorney General of the United States, was an associate with the law firm. Nancy Atlas, now a Senior US District Judge of the United States District Court for the Southern District of Texas, was an associate at the firm from 1976 to 1978. Catherine McCabe, who later served as Acting Administrator of the US Environmental Protection Agency in 2017, and whom New Jersey Governor Phil Murphy nominated to become Commissioner of the New Jersey Department of Environmental Protection in December 2017, was an associate at the firm in the late 1970s. Helene L. Kaplan, who later served as Chairman of the Carnegie Corporation of New York, was a partner of the firm.

Eliot Cutler, who was an Independent candidate in Maine's 2010 and 2014 gubernatorial races, worked from 1980 to 1988 as an associate for Webster & Sheffield, focusing mostly on environmental and land use issues. Webster became senior counsel in 1984. In 1988, Webster & Sheffield had 135 lawyers.

Webster & Sheffield dissolved in 1991, 57 years after it was established.
