= John Slate =

American lawyer

- Born: John Hampton Slate; 1913; Wind Gap, Pennsylvania, U.S.
- Died: September 19, 1967 (aged 53–54); Flower Hill, New York, U.S.
- Other name: John H. Slate
- Education: Columbia University (BA, LLB)
- Occupation: lawyer
- Employer: Skadden Arps Slate Meagher & Flom
- Known for: co-founding Skadden Arps Slate Meagher & Flom
- Spouse: Mary Ellen Sams Slate
- Children: Kathy (Kate) Slate, Megan Lloyd Slate, Nancy Hampton Slate, John Hampton Slate III

John Hampton Slate (1913 – September 19, 1967) was an American aviation lawyer and founding partner of Skadden, Arps, Slate, Meagher & Flom.

== Early life and education ==
Slate was born in Wind Gap, Pennsylvania, in 1913. His father was a civil engineer who worked in South America and left Slate with the wife's parents, who taught him Welsh before he spoke English. The family moved to Pittsburgh and Brooklyn, where he graduated from high school. Slate received an A.B. from Columbia College in 1935, graduating Phi Beta Kappa, and as salutatorian of his class.

He joined the board of Jester of Columbia, where he worked with Ralph de Toledano, Ad Reinhardt, Herman Wouk, and Robert Lax. He also befriended Thomas Merton, who hired him as legal advisor.

Slate turned down a partial scholarship from Harvard Law School and received a law degree from Columbia Law School in 1938. He was an editor of the Columbia Law Review and was admitted to the New York State Bar the year he graduated from law school.

== Career ==
In 1938, he became an associate of Root, Clark, Buckner & Ballantine in New York.

In April 1948, Slate co-founded Skadden Arps Slate Meagher & Flom with lawyers Marshall Skadden and Les Arps. Skadden won a coin toss with Slate and had his name become the shorthand of the firm. Slate's field was aviation law and brought in Idlewild Airport as his first client. However, the bulk of his work was for the general counsel of Pan-American World Airways, Henry Friendly, who later became circuit judge on the United States Court of Appeals for the Second Circuit. Slate's work for Pan Am represented half of the firm's annual income, eventually leading to other airline work such as with Aeronaves De Mexico, and clients that included a former President of Mexico.

In 1952, Slate was a special Assistant Attorney General of New York and from 1954 to 1957, he was a member of the United States Air Fleet Advisory Group.

== Personal life ==
Described as mischievous, moody, and conspicuously informal, Slate contributed humorous pieces to Fortune, The Atlantic Monthly, and The Saturday Evening Post.

== Death ==
Slate died of a heart attack on September 19, 1967, in St. Francis Hospital in Flower Hill, New York. He was survived by his widow, Mary Ellen Sams Slate, three daughters (Kathy, Megan, and Nancy), and a son, John Hampton Slate III, a graphic artist.
