= Douglas Rediker =

American lawyer

Member of the International Monetary Fund Executive Board
- In office March 10, 2010 – 2012
- President: Barack Obama

Personal details
- Spouse: Heidi Crebo-Rediker
- Education: Vassar College (AB); Fordham University (JD); Harvard University John F. Kennedy School MPA Program

Douglas A. Rediker is an American attorney and economist who is the founder and chairman of International Capital Strategies, LLC, a policy and markets advisory firm based in Washington, D.C. He is also a non-resident senior fellow at the Brookings Institution.

== Education ==
Rediker earned a Bachelor of Arts degree in political science from Vassar College and a Juris Doctor from the Fordham University School of Law. He also attended the Harvard University Kennedy School of Government MPA program.

== Career ==
Rediker began his career as an attorney with Skadden Arps in New York and Washington, D.C. He later worked as an investment banker and private equity investor for a number of investment banks, including Salomon Brothers, Merrill Lynch and Lehman Brothers. He was instrumental in leading a number of the earliest privatizations in Central and Eastern Europe. In particular, Rediker led many transactions involving the Hungarian Telecommunications Company, Magyar Telekom (previously known as Matav), including its initial public offering on the New York Stock Exchange. He was also a London-based partner in TD Capital, a private equity firm focused on media and telecommunications investments.

Rediker was a member of the National Finance Committee for the Barack Obama 2008 presidential campaign.

Rediker has been a non-resident Senior Fellow at the Brookings Institution in both the Foreign Policy and Global Economy and Development programs since April, 2016. Previously, from 2012 through 2016, he was a visiting fellow at the Peterson Institute for International Economics. Until 2012, he was a member of the executive board of the International Monetary Fund representing the United States. He was nominated by President Barack Obama on December 2, 2009. His confirmation hearing before the United States Senate Committee on Foreign Relations was held on January 28, 2010 and he was confirmed by the United States Senate on March 10, 2010.

He served on the Board of Directors of Cowen from 2015 until its acquisition by TD Bank in 2023.

Previously, he spent several years as the co-founder and director of the New America Foundation's Global Strategic Finance Initiative ("GSFI").

He has written extensively and testified before Congress on the subject of state capitalism, global finance, Sovereign Wealth Funds and other issues surrounding the relationship between global capital flows and their impact on foreign policy.

Rediker has received numerous industry awards, including having been named an "Emerging Markets Superstar" by Global Finance and has received both the "EEMEA Equity" and "M&A Deals of the Year" by The International Financing Review. He is a member of the Council on Foreign Relations. Rediker appears often in both broadcast and print media, and has been published in The New Republic, The National Interest and The Wall Street Journal.

== Personal life ==
He and his wife, Heidi Crebo-Rediker, co-founded the GSFI in 2007 after they both returned to the United States following 16 years in Europe. Crebo-Rediker left GSFI to join the staff of the Senate Foreign Relations Committee in February 2009. She later served as the first chief Economist at the US State Department, focused on economic statecraft initiative of Hillary Clinton.
