= Heidi Crebo-Rediker =

American economist

Heidi E. Crebo-Rediker is an American economist and finance professional. She served in several public service positions, including the U.S. State Department’s first chief economist during the Obama Administration. In this capacity she helped develop the administration’s Economic Statecraft mission, strategy and tools.

Upon leaving the Obama Administration, she became a senior fellow for geoeconomics at the Council on Foreign Relations and writes and speaks on the evolution of economic statecraft, economic security and U.S. competitiveness. As of 2018, she was chief executive officer at International Capital Stratregies and member of the global advisory board at fund adviser Campbell Lutyens.

== Education ==
Crebo-Rediker earned a BA from Dartmouth College and a Master of Science from the London School of Economics. From 1990 to 1992, Crebo-Rediker resided on the island of Sakhalin, Russia, where she reportedly learned to catch salmon with her bare hands.

== Career ==
Beginning in 2013, upon leaving the State Department, Crebo-Rediker became a Senior Fellow at the Council on Foreign Relations, a leading think tank in the United States. Her work at CFR is affiliated with the Greenberg Center for Geoeconomic Studies and she has written and spoken widely on investment in U.S. competitiveness, the intersection of economics, finance and geopolitics, and economic statecraft.

Heidi Crebo-Rediker was previously the CEO of International Capital Strategies and served as an Advisory Board Member for Campbell, Lutyens.

From 2012-2013, Crebo-Rediker served as the U.S. Department of State’s first Chief Economist, where she held a rank equivalent to a United States Assistant Secretary of State. She established this new office and provided advice and analysis to the Secretary of State on a wide range of foreign policy issues with significant economic, market or financial drivers. She also worked with Secretary Hillary Clinton and Secretary John Kerry to promote policies to support sustainable infrastructure and energy investment in the U.S. and around the world, structuring U.S government programs and tools to support economic growth, competitiveness, and entrepreneurship, and in particular more inclusive gender-driven economic growth in both developed and developing markets.

From 2009-2012, Ms. Crebo-Rediker served as the Chief of International Finance and Economics for the Senate Committee on Foreign Relations under then Committee Chairman John Kerry advising on domestic and international economic issues, especially those related to the global financial crisis, IMF and multilateral development banks. During this time she was also the architect of Senator Kerry’s bipartisan infrastructure bank legislation co-sponsored by Senator Kay Bailey-Hutchison, as well as bipartisan legislation creating U.S. sovereign debt guarantees and U.S. public-private enterprise funds to support investment in strategic countries.

From 2007-2009 Crebo-Rediker served as senior fellow at the New America Foundation and director of the Global Strategic Finance Initiative, which she co-founded.

Prior to moving back to the U.S. from London, UK in January 2007, Crebo-Rediker worked in private sector. Early in her career, Crebo-Rediker worked in investment banking, running businesses in both frontier and emerging markets as well as managing public sector businesses in developed markets. The Wall Street Journal Europe named Crebo-Rediker one of the “Top 25 Women in Business".

She began her career working for one of the first U.S.-Soviet joint ventures founded by options trader Joe Ritchie. Based on Sakhalin Island from 1990-1992 she invested in early ventures after the fall of the Berlin Wall, also working with the local government in the Soviet Union’s first Free Economic Zone to support the introduction of private enterprise. It was reported by The Independent that she was one of the first Westerners to move to Sakhalin Island after it ceased to be a closed military zone and navigated wild dogs in her Sakhalin apartment building.

== Personal ==
Crebo-Rediker is married to Douglas Rediker, a non-resident senior fellow at the Brookings Institution.

She is a Member of the Council on Foreign Relations and the Trilateral Commission and former Member of the World Economic Forum Global Agenda Council on the United States.
