= Bethuel M. Webster =

American lawyer

Bethuel Matthew Webster, Jr. (June 13, 1900 – March 31, 1989) was a lawyer in New York City, a president of the New York City Bar Association, an adviser to Mayor John Lindsay, and founder of Webster & Sheffield.

== Early life and education ==
Webster was born in Denver, Colorado, on June 13, 1900. He attended the University of Colorado and Harvard Law School.

== Early career ==
After graduating from Harvard, Webster served as assistant US Attorney for the Southern District of New York from 1926 to 1927, and as special assistant to the US Attorney General in the antitrust division of the Department of Justice from 1927 to 1929.

From 1929 to 1929, Webster was general counsel for the Federal Radio Commission, predecessor to the Federal Communications Commission, where he played an important role in upholding the licensing power of the federal government for radio airwaves, decisions later upheld for television airwaves as well. He quit the year he joined due to his belief that major corporations had undue power in Federal Radio Commission.

In 1934, Webster founded the now-defunct law firm of Webster, Sheffield, Fleischmann, Hitchcock & Chrystie (later, Webster & Sheffield) with Frederick Sheffield and Manly Fleischmann, which dissolved in 1991. With Webster & Sheffield, Webster represented a number of high-profile clients including Goldman Sachs, Consolidated Edison, the Ford Foundation, the New York City Public Library, and Carnegie Hall.

== Later career ==
After World War II, Webster served as special assistant to the High Commissioner of Germany, specializing in the decartelization of the German steel and coal industries and the enforcement of antitrust regulations.

Webster was counsel to the Fund for the Republic, a "think tank" established in 1952 for the defense of civil rights and civil liberties during the McCarthy period. As counsel, he represented the Fund in hearings before the notorious Un-American Activities Committee of the House of Representatives (HUAC). During this period he also defended William Remington, an economist and alleged Communist accused of espionage.

From 1959 to 1965, he served as a member of the Permanent Court of Arbitration in The Hague, and from 1965 to 1968 he mediated the international territorial dispute between Great Britain and Guatemala over British Honduras, now Belize.

Webster served chairman of the Drug Abuse Council created in 1972 by Ford and three other foundations to conduct an independent study of public drug policies and programs.

== New York City politics ==
Webster was a member of Mayor Robert F. Wagner's Committee for the Preservation of Structures of Historic and Esthetic Importance, and presided over Mayor John Lindsay's transitional team in 1965.

Under Lindsay, who was also a partner at Webster & Sheffield, Webster served as head of the New York City Cultural Council and was a key adviser in the administration. In The New York Times obituary of Webster, Lindsay recalled:

"He was always my guiding light, beginning with the law. Both as a Congressman and as Mayor, I turned to him in tough ones, on relations with people and arts programs. He was a constant adviser on arts programs, of particular concern because of the creation of Lincoln Center."

He was a member of the city's Art Commission and a trustee of the Ford Foundation. He was president of the Harvard Law School Association, and the Public Education Association, and, from 1952 to 1954, president of the New York City Bar Association.

He died on March 31, 1989, in Manhattan.
