= List of Columbia Law School alumni =

This is a partial list of individuals who have attended Columbia Law School. For a list of individuals who have attended or taught at Columbia University, see the list of Columbia University people.

== Government ==
=== United States government ===
==== Presidents ====
- Franklin Delano Roosevelt (attended, fall 1904 to spring 1907)² (posthumous J.D., class of 1907), 32nd president of the United States (1933–45)
- Theodore Roosevelt (attended, 1880–81)² (posthumous J.D., class of 1882), 26th president of the United States (1901–09), hero of the Spanish–American War (Medal of Honor, posthumously awarded 2001), Nobel Peace Prize (1906)

==== Cabinet members and cabinet-level officers ====
- Frank Blake (1976), deputy United States secretary of energy (2nd ranking official in the United States Department of Energy)
- Antony John 'Tony' Blinken (1988), United States Secretary of State in Biden Administration (2021–25), National Security Advisor to Vice President Joseph Biden in the administration of President Barack Obama (2009–17)
- J. Reuben Clark (1906), U.S. under secretary of state for President Calvin Coolidge (2nd ranking official in the U.S. Department of State from 1919 to 1972)
- Bainbridge Colby (1891), United States secretary of state (1920–21); founder of the Progressive Party (1912)
- Jacob M. Dickinson (attended), 44th United States secretary of war (1909–11)
- James Rudolph Garfield (1888), United States secretary of the interior (1907–09), United States Civil Service Commission (1902–03)
- Eric Hargan, acting deputy secretary, United States Department of Health and Human Services (2nd ranking official in the department) under President Donald Trump
- Eric Holder (1976), 82nd United States attorney general, former acting U.S. attorney general, former U.S. deputy attorney general
- Charles Evans Hughes (1884), United States secretary of state, professor of law at Cornell Law School, governor of New York (1907), associate justice of the United States Supreme Court (1910–16), Republican nominee for president of the United States (1916-against Woodrow Wilson), and chief justice of the Supreme Court (1930–41)
- Harold M. Ickes, deputy chief of staff in the Clinton administration
- John Jay,¹ acting United States secretary of state (1789–90); sixth president of the Continental Congress (1778–79); second U.S. secretary of Foreign Affairs (1784–89); acting U.S. secretary of Foreign Affairs (1789); co-author of The Federalist Papers
- Jeh Johnson, U.S. secretary of Homeland Security (2013–)
- Franklin MacVeagh (1864), U.S. secretary of the treasury (1909–13)
- Joseph McKenna, 42nd attorney general of the United States (1897–98) (studied at Columbia Law while AG, before taking seat on U.S. Supreme Court)
- Frank Polk (1897), acting United States secretary of state (1920), under secretary of state (2nd ranking official in the U.S. Department of State) (1919–20)
- George Lockhart Rives (B.A. 1868, LL.B.1873), U.S. assistant secretary of state (2nd ranking official in the U.S. Department of State from 1853 until 1913) (1887–89)
- Oscar S. Straus (1873), U.S. secretary of Commerce and Labor (1906–09), first Jewish presidential cabinet secretary
- John J. Sullivan (J.D. 1985), U.S. deputy secretary of commerce (2nd ranking official in the U.S. Department of Commerce) (2008–09) under George W. Bush
- Russell E. Train (1948), 2nd administrator, United States Environmental Protection Agency (EPA) (cabinet level officer) (1973–77); chairman, newly formed president's Council on Environmental Quality (1970–73); 1991 Presidential Medal of Freedom
- Harold R. Tyler, Jr. (1949), United States deputy attorney general (2nd ranking official in the U.S. Department of Justice) (1975–77)
- J. Mayhew Wainwright (1886), U.S. assistant secretary of war (2nd ranking official in the U.S. Department of War until 1940) (1921–23)
- Lawrence Edward Walsh (1935), United States deputy attorney general (2nd ranking official in the U.S. Department of Justice) (1957–60)

==== Directors of the CIA ====
- William Colby (1947), Medal of Honor; 10th U.S. director of Central Intelligence for the United States Central Intelligence Agency under Presidents Richard Nixon and Gerald Ford (1973–76)
- William Joseph Donovan (Law 1908), known as "father" of the Central Intelligence Agency (CIA); founder and first director of the Office of Strategic Services (OSS) (formed during World War II, the predecessor of the CIA); U.S. coordinator of Information (COI) under Franklin D. Roosevelt; also World War I hero, Medal of Honor; 1959 Freedom Award

==== White House Counsel ====
- Lanny A. Breuer (B.A. 1980, J.D. 1985), special White House counsel (1997–99) under Clinton; helped represent President Clinton during independent counsel and congressional investigations and the impeachment hearings; Covington & Burling vice chair; former assistant Manhattan D.A. (1985–1989); U.S. assistant A.G. for the Criminal Division (2009–2013) under Obama
- Trevor Morrison (1998), associate White House counsel to President Barack Obama (2009–10), professor of constitutional law at Columbia Law School
- Benjamin Powell (1996), associate White House counsel and special assistant to the president during administration of George W. Bush; general counsel, Office of the Director of National Intelligence (general counsel to the first three directors of National Intelligence) (2006–09)
- David B. Rivkin (J.D.), legal advisor to White House counsel of then President Reagan; deputy director of the Office of Policy Development (OPD)
- Samuel Irving Rosenman (1919), first White House counsel (1943–46) under Presidents Franklin D. Roosevelt and Harry S. Truman
- Charles Ruff (1963), White House counsel under President Bill Clinton, defended President during impeachment trial in 1999
- Donald B. Verrilli, Jr. (1983), deputy White House counsel under President Barack Obama

==== Solicitor General ====
- Lloyd Wheaton Bowers, United States solicitor general (1909–10)
- Charles Fried (1960), U.S. solicitor general (1985–89), acting United States solicitor general, deputy United States solicitor general
- Daniel M. Friedman (1940), acting U.S. solicitor general (1977); first deputy solicitor general
- R. Kent Greenawalt (1963), deputy U.S. solicitor general (1971–72)
- Stanley Foreman Reed, U.S. solicitor general (1935–38)
- Donald Verrilli Jr. (1983), U.S. solicitor general (2011–); White House deputy counsel to the president (2010–11)

==== Presidential advisors ====
- Mark Barnes (LL.M. 1991), member, National Health Care Reform Task Force in the administration of President Bill Clinton
- John D. Clark (1907), member of President's Council of Economic Advisors (1946–53) under President Harry S Truman
- Jonathan W. Daniels (failed out of the Law School), White House press secretary under Presidents Franklin D. Roosevelt and Harry S. Truman
- Stephen Friedman (1962), director, president's United States National Economic Council under George W. Bush (2002–05), chairman of the President's Foreign Intelligence Advisory Board (2005–09) (replacing Brent Scowcroft)
- Ulysses S. Grant, Jr., personal secretary to President Ulysses S. Grant
- John Marshall Kernochan, member of President John F. Kennedy's Commission on the Status of Women, which helped lead to women's rights legislation in the late 1960s
- Ken Khachigian (J.D 1969), speechwriter for President Richard Nixon, chief speechwriter for President Ronald Reagan
- Jay Lefkowitz (1987), deputy assistant to President George W. Bush for Domestic Policy
- Kathleen McGinty (J.D.), chair of the Council on Environmental Quality (1995–98)
- Brett H. McGurk (1999), United States National Security Council under President George W. Bush; special adviser-Iraq (2009–); private militias in Iraq
- S. Jay Plager (LL.M. 1961), associate director, United States Office of Management and Budget (1987–88)
- Lynn Forester de Rothschild, U.S. secretary of energy Advisory Board under President Bill Clinton
- Richard Stone, vice chairman of President Ronald Reagan's Commission for Radio Broadcasting to Cuba

==== Commissioners and agency heads, subcabinet members ====
- Carol A. DiBattiste (LL.M. 1986), former U.S. under secretary of the Air Force (2nd highest civilian official in the U.S. Department of the Air Force) (1999–2001)
- Nathan Feinsinger (Law, post-graduate study), chairman, U.S. Wage Stabilization Board, named to the board in 1951 by President Harry S. Truman
- William Dudley Foulke (1871), commissioner, United States Civil Service Commission, which subsequently became the U.S. Office of Personnel Management (OPM) with some functions spun off to the U.S. Office of Special Counsel and the U.S. Equal Employment Opportunity Commission (EEOC)
- Harvey Goldschmid (1965), commissioner (2002–05), and previously general counsel, special adviser to the chairman, United States Securities and Exchange Commission
- Henry Clay Hall (1883), twice chairman (1917–18, 1924), commissioner (1914–28), Interstate Commerce Commission
- John D. Hawke, Jr. (1960), U.S. comptroller of the Currency (1998–2004) under Presidents Bill Clinton and George W. Bush; director of the U.S. Federal Deposit Insurance Corporation, among other agencies (1998–2004); under secretary of the Treasury for Domestic Finance (1995–98)
- Edward Hidalgo (1936), secretary of the Navy (1979–81); assistant secretary of the Navy (Manpower and Reserve Affairs) (1977–79)
- William Kovacic (1978), chairman (2008–09), commissioner (2006–09), Federal Trade Commission
- Irving Lewis "Scooter" Libby (1975), chief of staff to Vice President Dick Cheney (2001–05); convicted on obstruction of justice charges for his role in Plame affair (2007); novelist
- Charles E. F. Millard, director, United States Pension Benefit Guaranty Corporation (2007–09)
- Annette Nazareth, commissioner, United States Securities and Exchange Commission (2005–08)
- Robert Pitofsky, chairman (1995–2001), commissioner (1978–81), Federal Trade Commission
- Tracy Voorhees (1915), under secretary of the United States Army (2nd ranking official in the U.S. Army) (1949–50)
- Mary Jo White (1974), chairman (2013–), commissioner (2013–), United States Securities and Exchange Commission

Mozelle W. Thompson, commissioner (1997-2004), United States Federal Trade Commission, Deputy Assistant Secretary of the Treasury (1993-1997)

==== U.S. Supreme Court ====
- Samuel Blatchford (1837)¹, associate justice of the Supreme Court (1882–93)
- Benjamin Nathan Cardozo (B.A.-CC, attended Law School for two years), associate justice of the Supreme Court (1932–38); judge, New York Court of Appeals (1914–32)
- William O. Douglas (1925), associate justice of the Supreme Court (1939–75); professor at Columbia Law and Yale Law School (1928–34), chairman of the U.S. Securities and Exchange Commission (1936–39)
- Ruth Bader Ginsburg (1959), associate justice of the Supreme Court (1993–2020); professor at Rutgers Law (1963–72) and Columbia Law (1972–80); ACLU attorney (1972–80); judge, United States Court of Appeals for the District of Columbia Circuit (1980–93)
- Charles Evans Hughes (1884), chief justice of the United States (1930–41); associate justice of the Supreme Court (1910–16); secretary of state (1921–29); governor of New York (1907); Republican nominee for president of the United States (1916)
- John Jay (1764)¹, first chief justice of the United States (1789–95)
- Joseph McKenna (studied at the law school), associate justice of the Supreme Court (1892–97)
- Stanley Forman Reed, associate justice of the Supreme Court (1938–57); United States solicitor general (1935–38)
- Harlan Fiske Stone (1898), chief justice of the United States (1941–46); associate justice of the Supreme Court (1925–41); attorney general (1924–25); professor (1902–05) and dean (1910–23) at Columbia Law School

==== U.S. Court of Appeals ====
- Joseph F. Bianco (1991), United States Court of Appeals for the Second Circuit (2019–); United States District Court for the Eastern District of New York (2005–19)
- Samuel Blatchford, former United States Court of Appeals for the Second Circuit, United States District Court for the Southern District of New York
- Hugh H. Bownes (1948), United States Court of Appeals for the First Circuit (1977–2003), United States District Court for the District of New Hampshire (1968–77)
- LeBaron Bradford Colt (1870), United States Court of Appeals for the First Circuit (1891–13); United States Circuit Court (1894–91); United States District Court for the District of Rhode Island (1881–84)
- Kyle Duncan (LL.M. 2004), United States Court of Appeals for the Fifth Circuit (2018–)
- James Alger Fee (1914), United States Court of Appeals for the Ninth Circuit (1954–59), United States District Court for the District of Oregon (1931–54)
- Wilfred Feinberg (1946), United States Court of Appeals for the Second Circuit
- Daniel M. Friedman (1940), United States Court of Appeals for the Federal Circuit (1982–2011); Chief judge, United States Court of Claims (1978–82)
- John Patrick Hartigan (A.M., LL.B.), United States Court of Appeals for the First Circuit (1951–68), United States District Court for the District of Rhode Island (1940–51)
- Paul Raymond Hays, United States Court of Appeals for the Second Circuit (1961–80)
- Emile Henry Lacombe (1865), United States Court of Appeals for the Second Circuit (1887–1916)
- Barbara Lagoa (1992), United States Court of Appeals for the Eleventh Circuit (2019–); favored Supreme Court nominee to replace Ruth Bader Ginsburg
- Harold Leventhal (1936), United States Court of Appeals for the District of Columbia Circuit (1965–79)
- Gerard E. Lynch (1975), U.S. Court of Appeals for the Second Circuit (2009–); U.S. District Court for the Southern District of New York (2000–09); professor, Columbia (1977–)
- J. Daniel Mahoney (1955), United States Court of Appeals for the Second Circuit (1986–96)
- Martin Manton (1901), United States Court of Appeals for the Second Circuit (1918–39), United States District Court for the Southern District of New York (1916–18)
- Julius Marshuetz Mayer, United States Court of Appeals for the Second Circuit (1921–24); United States District Court for the Southern District of New York (1912–21)
- Harold Medina (1912), former United States Court of Appeals for the Second Circuit; United States District Court for the Southern District of New York; cover of Time magazine, October 24, 1949; noted for hearing landmark cases of conspiracy and treason; professor of law at Columbia Law; lawyer
- Jack Miller (1946), former United States Court of Appeals for the Federal Circuit, United States Court of Customs and Patent Appeals
- Leonard P. Moore, United States Court of Appeals for the Second Circuit (1957–82)
- Myrna Perez (2003), United States Court of Appeals for the Second Circuit
- Giles Sutherland Rich (1929), former United States Court of Appeals for the Federal Circuit, United States Court of Customs and Patent Appeals; co-author, Patent Act of 1952
- S. Jay Plager (LL.M. 1961), United States Court of Appeals for the Federal Circuit
- Robert D. Sack (1963), United States Court of Appeals for the Second Circuit
- James Marshall Sprouse (1949), United States Court of Appeals for the Fourth Circuit (1979–92; senior status 1992–95)
- Richard Wilde Walker, Jr. (attended), United States Court of Appeals for the Fifth Circuit (1914–36)
- Jerre Stockton Williams (1941), United States Court of Appeals for the Fifth Circuit (1980–93)
- Peter Woodbury, chief judge (1959–64) and judge (1941–59), United States Court of Appeals for the First Circuit, senior status (1964–70)

==== U.S. District Courts ====
- Lynn Adelman (1965), United States District Court for the Eastern District of Wisconsin (1997–)
- Harry B. Anderson (1904), United States District Court for the Western District of Tennessee (1926–1935)
- Benjamin Beaton (2009), United States District Court for the Western District of Kentucky (2020–)
- Charles L. Brieant (1949), United States District Court for the Southern District of New York (1971–2008)
- Anita B. Brody (1958), United States District Court for the Eastern District of Pennsylvania (1992–)
- Frederick van Pelt Bryan (1928), United States District Court for the Southern District of New York (1956–1978)
- Naomi Reice Buchwald (1968), United States District Court for the Southern District of New York (1999–)
- Mortimer W. Byers (1898), United States District Court for the Eastern District of New York (1929–1962)
- Robert L. Carter (1941), United States District Court for the Southern District of New York (1972–2012)
- Miriam Goldman Cedarbaum (1953), United States District Court for the Southern District of New York (1986–2016)
- Thomas Chatfield (1896), United States District Court for the Eastern District of New York (1907–1925)
- U. W. Clemon (1968), United States District Court for the Northern District of Alabama (1980–2009); chief judge (1999–2006)
- Denise Cote (1975), United States District Court for the Southern District of New York (1994–)
- Joseph Cross, United States District Court for the District of New Jersey (1905–1913)
- Archie Owen Dawson (1923), United States District Court for the Southern District of New York (1954–1964)
- Dickinson R. Debevoise (1951), United States District Court for the District of New Jersey (1979–2015)
- James Edward Doyle (1940), United States District Court for the Western District of Wisconsin (1965–1987); chief judge (1978–1980)
- Marvin E. Frankel (1948), United States District Court for the Southern District of New York (1965–1978); professor at Columbia
- Lee Parsons Gagliardi (1947), United States District Court for the Southern District of New York (1971–1998)
- Nicholas Garaufis (1974), United States District Court for the Eastern District of New York (2000–)
- Paul G. Gardephe (1982), United States District Court for the Southern District of New York (2009–)
- Gerard Louis Goettel (1955), United States District Court for the Southern District of New York (1976–2011)
- Nathaniel M. Gorton (1966), United States District Court for the District of Massachusetts (1992–)
- Alexander Harvey II (1950), United States District Court for the District of Maryland (1966–2017)
- Alvin Hellerstein (1958), United States District Court for the Southern District of New York (1998–2026)
- William Bernard Herlands (1928), United States District Court for the Southern District of New York (1959–1969)
- George Chandler Holt (1869), United States District Court for the Southern District of New York (1903–1914)
- Alexander Holtzoff (1911), United States District Court for the District of Columbia (1945–1967)
- Richard J. Holwell (1970), United States District Court for the Southern District of New York (2003–2012)
- Denise Page Hood (1977), United States District Court for the Eastern District of Michigan (1994–)
- Beryl Howell (1983), United States District Court for the District of Columbia (2010–)
- Dora Irizarry (1979), United States District Court for the Eastern District of New York (2003–)
- Kenneth M. Karas (1991), United States District Court for the Southern District of New York (2004–)
- Lawrence K. Karlton (1958), United States District Court for the Eastern District of California (1979–2015); chief judge (1983–1990)
- Peter K. Leisure (attended), United States District Court for the Southern District of New York (1984–2013)
- Ira Lloyd Letts (1917), United States District Court for the District of Rhode Island (1928–1935)
- Mary Johnson Lowe (LL.M. 1955), United States District Court for the Southern District of New York (1978–1999)
- John S. Martin Jr. (1961), United States District Court for the Southern District of New York (1990–2003)
- Charles Miller Metzner (1933), United States District Court for the Southern District of New York (1959–2009)
- Constance Baker Motley (1946), United States District Court for the Southern District of New York (1966–2005); first African-American woman appointed to federal bench; attorney for the NAACP ('45–64); Manhattan borough president ('64–66)
- Edmund Louis Palmieri (1929), United States District Court for the Southern District of New York (1954–1989)
- Robert P. Patterson Jr. (1950), United States District Court for the Southern District of New York (1988–2015)
- Milton Pollack (A.M., LL.M.), United States District Court for the Southern District of New York (1967–2004)
- Walter Herbert Rice (JD/MBA 1962), United States District Court for the Southern District of Ohio (1980–); chief judge (1996–2003)
- Simon H. Rifkind (1925), United States District Court for the Southern District of New York (1941–1950)
- Richard W. Roberts (1978), United States District Court for the District of Columbia (1998–)
- Richard Seeborg, United States District Court for the Northern District of California (2009–); chief judge (2021–2026)
- Charles Proctor Sifton (1961), United States District Court for the Eastern District of New York (1977–2009)
- Arun Subramanian (2004), United States District Court for the Southern District of New York (2023–)
- John Foster Symes (1903), United States District Court for the District of Colorado (1922–1951)
- Analisa Torres (1984), United States District Court for the Southern District of New York (2012–)
- Harold R. Tyler Jr. (1949), United States District Court for the Southern District of New York (1962–1975); United States Deputy Attorney General (1975–1977)
- Lawrence Walsh (1935), United States District Court for the Southern District of New York (1954–1957); United States Deputy Attorney General (1957–1961)
- Jack B. Weinstein (1948), United States District Court for the Eastern District of New York (1967–2021); professor at Columbia (1952–1998)
- Francis A. Winslow, United States District Court for the Southern District of New York (1927–1929)
- John M. Woolsey, United States District Court for the Southern District of New York (1929–1943)
- Joseph Carmine Zavatt (1924), United States District Court for the Eastern District of New York (1957–1977)

==== Other federal courts ====
- Robert Gerber (1970), United States Bankruptcy Court for the Southern District of New York, presiding over 2009 General Motors bankruptcy and other major bankruptcies
- Timothy M. Reif (1985), United States Court of International Trade (2019–)
- Russell E. Train (1948), former United States Tax Court (1957–65)
- Sumner L. Trussell, judge of the United States Board of Tax Appeals
- Norman H. Wolfe (1953), special trial judge in the United States Tax Court (1985–?)

==== Legislative branch ====
===== Senators =====
- Alva B. Adams (1899), U.S. senator from Colorado (1923–24, 1933–41)
- Johnson N. Camden Jr., senator from Kentucky (1914–15)
- Clifford P. Case (1928), senator (1955–79) from New Jersey
- LeBaron B. Colt (1870), senator from Rhode Island (1913–24)
- Slade Gorton (1953), senator from Washington (1981–87;1989–2001)
- Frederick Hale (1896–97), senator from Maine (1917–41)
- Lister Hill (left 1915), senator (1938–69) from Alabama
- Richard C. Hunter (1911), senator from Nebraska (1934–35)
- John Kean (1875), senator from New Jersey (1899–1911)
- Luke Lea (1903), senator from Tennessee (1911–17)
- Thomas E. Martin (LL.M. 1928), senator (1955–61) from Iowa
- Jack Miller (1946), senator from Iowa (1961–73)
- Dwight Morrow (1898?), senator from New Jersey (1930–31)
- Wayne Morse (S.J.D. 1932), senator from Oregon (1945–69)
- Frank C. Partridge (1864), senator from Vermont (1930–31)
- John Patton Jr. (1877), senator from Michigan (1894–95)
- Howard Alexander Smith (1908), senator from New Jersey (1944–59)
- Richard Stone (1954), senator from Florida (1975–80)
- Arthur Vivian Watkins, senator from New York (1947–59)
- George P. Wetmore (1869), senator from Rhode Island (1895–1907; 1908–13)
- Harrison A. Williams (1948), senator (1959–82) from New Jersey

===== Representatives =====
- Bella Abzug, congresswoman from New York (1971–77) and leader of the women's movement
- John J. Adams, congressman from New York (1883–85;1885–87)
- Homer D. Angell (1903), congressman from Oregon (1939–55)
- Martin C. Ansorge (1906), congressman from New York (1921–23)
- Edward Basset (1886), congressman from New York (1903–05); founding father, modern urban planning; developed "freeway" and "parkway" concepts
- Perry Belmont (1876), congressman from New York (1880–88)
- Loring Black, congressman from New York (1923–35)
- Robert William Bonynge (1885), congressman from Colorado (1904–09)
- Frank T. Bow, congressman from Ohio (1951–72)
- Lloyd Bryce, congressman from New York (1887–89)
- John F. Carew (B.A. 1893, LL.M. 1896), congressman from New York (1913–29)
- Clifford P. Case (1928), congressman (1945–53) and senator (1955–79) from New Jersey
- Emanuel Celler (1912), congressman from New York (1923–73)
- Alexander Gilmore Cochran, congressman from Pennsylvania (1875–77)
- Frederic René Coudert, Jr. (1922), congressman from New York (1947–59)
- Robert Crosser (transferred), congressman from Ohio (1913–19, 1923–55)
- Colgate Darden (1923), congressman from Virginia (1933–37, 1939–41), governor of Virginia (1942–46), chancellor of the College of William and Mary (1946–47), president of the University of Virginia (1947–59); namesake of the Darden Graduate School of Business Administration
- Philip Henry Dugro (1878), congressman from New York (1881–83)
- Charles T. Dunwell (1874), congressman from New York (1903–08)
- Sidney A. Fine (1926), congressman from New York (1951–56)
- Hamilton Fish II (1873), congressman from New York (1909–11)
- Ashbel P. Fitch, congressman from New York (1887–93)
- Frank T. Fitzgerald (1876), congressman from New York (1889)
- Wallace T. Foote, Jr., congressman from New York (1895–99)
- George E. Foss (attended), congressman from Illinois (1895–1913; 1915–19)
- Samuel Fowler, represented New Jersey's 4th congressional district as U.S. representative 1889–1893; built and operated Cape Cod Canal
- Jaime Fuster (LL.M. 1966), U.S. representative from Puerto Rico's at-large district (1985–92)
- Ralph A. Gamble (1912), congressman from New York (1937–45; 1945–53; 1953–57)
- Fred Benjamin Gernerd (1924), congressman from Pennsylvania (1921–23)
- James R. Grover, Jr. (1949), congressman from New York (1963–75)
- Ralph W. Gwinn (1908), congressman from New York (1945–59)
- Thomas Hedge (1869), congressman from Iowa (1899–1907)
- Lewis Henry (1911), congressman from New York (1922–23)
- Lister Hill (left 1915), congressman (1923–38) and senator (1938–69) from Alabama
- Theodore Gaillard Hunt, congressman from Louisiana (1853–55)
- Hamilton C. Jones (1907), congressman from North Carolina (1947–53)
- John Kean (1875), senator and congressman from New Jersey (1899–1911)
- Theodore R. Kupferman, congressman from New York (1966–69)
- George P. Lawrence, congressman from Massachusetts (1898–1913)
- John J. Lentz (1883), congressman from Ohio (1897–1901)
- Montague Lessler (1889), congressman from New York (1902–03)
- Marcus C. Lisle, congressman from Kentucky (1893–94)
- Thomas E. Martin (LL.M. 1928), senator (1955–61), congressman (1939–55) from Iowa
- Mitchell May (LL.M. 1892), congressman from New York (1899–1901)
- Washington J. McCormick (1910), congressman from Montana (1921–23)
- John McKeon (1828), congressman from New York (1835–37, 1841–43)
- Roy H. McVicker (1950), congressman from Colorado (1965–67)
- Schuyler Merritt (1876), congressman from Connecticut (1917–31; 1933–37)
- Brad Miller (1979), congressman from North Carolina (2003–13)
- J. Van Vechten Olcott (1877), congressman from New York (1905–11)
- William Claiborne Owens (1872), congressman from Kentucky (1895–97)
- Richard W. Parker (1869), congressman from New Jersey (1895–1903; 1903–11; 1914–19; 1921–23)
- Thomas G. Patten (1880–82), congressman from New York (1911–17)
- William Walter Phelps (1863), congressman from New Jersey (1873–75; 1883–89)
- Philip J. Philbin (1929), congressman from Massachusetts (1943–76)
- Otis G. Pike (1948), congressman from New York (1961–79)
- Henry Jarvis Raymond (1871), congressman from New York (1865–67); lieutenant governor of New York (1854–56); founder of The New York Times
- Edward Everett Robbins (1884), congressman from Pennsylvania (1897–99; 1917–19)
- William Fitts Ryan (1949), congressman from New York (1961–72)
- James Scheuer (1948), congressman from New York (1965–93)
- Townsend Scudder (1888), congressman from New York (1899–1901; 1903–05)
- John F. Seiberling (1949), congressman from Ohio (1971–87)
- Eugene Siler (attended), congressman from Kentucky (1955–63, 1963–65)
- Percy Hamilton Stewart (1893), congressman from New Jersey (1931–33)
- Jessie Sumner (studied at the Law School), congresswoman from Illinois (1939–47)
- Edward Swann (1886), congressman from New York (in 57th U.S. Congress); New York County district attorney (1916–21)
- James W. Symington (1954), congressman from Missouri (1969–77)
- Charles Phelps Taft (1864), congressman from Ohio (1895–97); editor of the Cincinnati Times-Star; owner, Chicago Cubs (1914–16)
- Benjamin I. Taylor (1899), congressman from New York (1913–15)
- John A. Thayer, congressman from Massachusetts (1911–13)
- J. Mayhew Wainwright (1886), congressman from New York (1923–31)
- William C. Wallace (1876), congressman from New York (1889–91)
- Charles Weltner (1950), congressman from Georgia (1963–67), John F. Kennedy Profile in Courage Award
- Harrison A. Williams (1948), congressman (1953–57) and senator (1959–82) from New Jersey
- Francis H. Wilson (1875), congressman from New York (1895–97)
- Herbert Zelenko (1928), congressman from New York (1955–63)

===== Other legislative branch officials =====
- Herbert Putnam (1884), Librarian of Congress

==== United States diplomats ====
- William Waldorf Astor, 1st Viscount Astor, U.S. minister to Italy, statesman, philanthropist
- Perry Belmont (1876), U.S. ambassador to Spain (1888–89); congressman from New York (1880–88)
- Lloyd Bryce, U.S. minister plenipotentiary to the Netherlands (1911–13)
- Charles Chaille-Long, U.S. consul general and secretary to delegation in Korea; soldier, explorer
- Reuben Clark, U.S. ambassador to Mexico (1930–33)
- William Joseph Donovan (1905), U.S. ambassador to Thailand (1953–54), World War I hero, head of the OSS during World War II
- Abram Isaac Elkus, appointed by Woodrow Wilson to be the U.S. ambassador to the Ottoman Empire in Constantinople (1916–17)
- Anthony Luzzatto Gardner, U.S. ambassador to the European Union (present)
- Makila James, nominee, U.S. ambassador to the Kingdom of Swaziland (2012–)
- John Jay (1764), helped fashion American foreign policy, U.S. minister (ambassador) to Spain and France; the Jay Treaty
- Hallett Johnson (1912), ambassador to Costa Rica
- Jay Lefkowitz, President George W. Bush's special envoy for Human Rights in North Korea
- Charles MacVeagh (1883), U.S. ambassador to Japan (1925–28)
- David E. Mark, U.S. ambassador to Burundi (1974–77); career minister, serving in South Korea, Germany, Moscow; helped Georgians write their Constitution
- Vilma Socorro Martínez, first woman to serve as U.S. ambassador to Argentina (2009–)
- Brett H. McGurk (1999), nominee, U.S. ambassador to the Republic of Iraq (2012–)
- Henry Morgenthau, Sr., U.S. ambassador to the Ottoman Empire (1913–16)
- Dwight Morrow (1898?), U.S. ambassador to Mexico (1927–30)
- Covey T. Oliver (S.J.D. 1953), U.S. ambassador to Colombia (1964–66)
- Frank C. Partridge (LL.B. 1884), U.S. minister to Venezuela (1893–94), consul general at Tangier, Morocco (1897–98)
- William Walter Phelps (1863), U.S. ambassador to Austria-Hungary (1881–82), Germany (1889–93)
- Frank Polk (1897), headed American Commission to Negotiate Peace (1919)
- Stephen Rapp, U.S. ambassador-at-large for War Crimes Issues in the Office of Global Criminal Justice (2009–)
- Mitchell Reiss, former director of Policy Planning at U.S. State Department under Secretary Colin Powell (2003–05); U.S. special envoy to Ireland with diplomatic rank of ambassador (stepped down in 2007); chief negotiator for the United States in the Korean Peninsula Energy Development Organization
- Julissa Reynoso (2001), U.S. ambassador to Uruguay (2011–)
- John Wallace Riddle (1890), U.S. ambassador to Russia (1907–09); Argentina (1922–25)
- Eugene Schuyler (1863), first American diplomat to visit Central Asia, first U.S. minister to Romania and Serbia, also U.S. minister to Greece
- David S. Smith, U.S. ambassador to Sweden (1976–77)
- Laurence A. Steinhardt (LL.B. 1915), U.S. ambassador to the Soviet Union (1939–41); U.S. ambassador to Turkey (1942–45); U.S. ambassador to Czechoslovakia (1945–48); U.S. ambassador to Sweden (1933–37); U.S. ambassador to Peru (1937–39); U.S. ambassador to Canada (1948–50)
- Oscar S. Straus (1873), thrice U.S. ambassador to the Ottoman Empire (1909–10; 1898–99; 1887–89)
- Tracy Voorhees (1915), the U.S. president's personal representative for Cuban Refugees (1960–61) in the administration of President John F. Kennedy
- Edward T. Wailes (1927), U.S. ambassador to Iran (1958–61), Czechoslovakia (1961–62), Hungary (1956–57), South Africa
- Lawrence Edward Walsh (1935), ambassador, U.S. Delegation, Paris Peace Talks (1969)
- Paul Warnke (1948), chief SALT negotiator under President Jimmy Carter and director of the Arms Control and Disarmament Agency (1976–78), helped negotiate the unratified SALT II agreement with the former Soviet Union
- H. Walter Webb, U.S. ambassador to Brazil
- Nugroho Wisnumurti (J.D. 1973), president, United Nations Security Council (August 1995 and November 1996); ambassador/permanent representative of the Republic of Indonesia to the United Nations (1992–97); Indonesia's permanent representative to the United Nations and Other Organizations in Geneva (2000–04)

==== Military ====
- William Joseph Donovan (Wild Bill) (LL.B.), World War I, World War II hero; only person to receive Medal of Honor, Distinguished Service Cross, Distinguished Service Medal (3), and National Security Medal; also recipient of Silver Star, Purple Heart (2), and IRC's Freedom Award
- Ira C. Eaker (studied law), Congressional Gold Medal; four-star general, United States Army Air Forces during World War II; architect, strategic bombing force
- Benjamin Kaplan (LL.B. 1933), while a lieutenant colonel in U.S. Army during World War II, "one of the principal architects" of the Nuremberg trials
- Philip Kearny (LL.B. 1833), brigadier general, U.S. Army; notable for his leadership in the Mexican–American War and Civil War
- Charles Coudert Nast (LL.B. 1927), attorney and U.S. Army major general
- John Watts de Peyster (studied law), major general during the American Civil War; author on the art of war, one of the first military critics
- John Watts de Peyster, Jr. (studied law), brigadier general; Union Army officer during the American Civil War
- Rudolph Douglas Raiford (J.D.), decorated African-American World War II combat officer who trained and commanded the Infantry Buffalo Division in Italy
- Richard W. Young (LL.B. 1884) brigadier general; in Spanish–American War led Utah Light Artillery in Philippines; in World War I led a U.S. artillery brigade in France

==== Miscellaneous United States government ====
- Zainab Ahmad (2005), assistant United States attorney for the Eastern District of New York; member of the 2017 Special Counsel for the United States Department of Justice team
- David M. Becker (1973), general counsel, senior policy director, U.S. Securities and Exchange Commission (SEC) (2009–11); general counsel, SEC (2000–02)
- Richard Ben-Veniste (1967), federal prosecutor (1968–73); chief, Watergate Task Force of the Special Prosecutor's Office (1973–75); member, 9/11 Commission (2002–04)
- Moe Berg (1930), spy, Office of Strategic Services (OSS), able to speak 12 languages; light-hitting catcher, Brooklyn Robins (1923), Chicago White Sox (1926–30), Cleveland Indians (1931, 34), Washington Senators (1932–34) and Boston Red Sox (1935–39); according to Casey Stengel, "the strangest man ever to play Major League Baseball"
- Preet Bharara (1993), U.S. attorney for the Southern District of New York (2009–); one of Time magazine's 2012 "100 Most Influential People in the World"
- Walker Blaine (1878), former official in the United States Department of State; solicitor of the Department of State
- Frank Blake (1976), general counsel, United States Environmental Protection Agency, deputy counsel to Vice President George H. W. Bush
- Lanny A. Breuer, head, Criminal Division, United States Department of Justice in administration of President Barack Obama
- Edward Bruce (1904), appointed by Franklin D. Roosevelt as director of Public Works of Art Project and Section of Painting and Sculpture, New Deal projects
- George Canellos (1989), regional director, United States Securities and Exchange Commission's New York Office (2009–)
- Sheila C. Cheston (1984), former general counsel, United States Air Force (1995–98)
- Tristram Coffin (1989), U.S. attorney for the District of Vermont (2009–)
- Roy Cohn (1947), anti-communist attorney; influential aide to Senator Joseph McCarthy; active in espionage trial of Julius and Ethel Rosenberg
- Mathias F. Correa (1934), U.S. attorney for the Southern District of New York (1941–43)
- William Joseph Donovan (1908), U.S. attorney for the Western District of New York, World War I hero (Medal of Honor)
- Jose W. Fernandez, U.S. assistant secretary of state for Economic, Energy, and Business Affairs (2009–)
- Slade Gorton (1953), member, 9/11 Commission
- Eric Holder (1976), U.S. attorney for the District of Columbia
- Bill Lann Lee (1974), assistant attorney general of the United States for Civil Rights (1997–2001)
- Russell Cornell Leffingwell (1902), assistant U.S. secretary of the treasury; led (1944–53) and president (1944–46), Council of Foreign Relations
- Gillian Metzger (1995), Assistant Attorney General for the Office of Legal Counsel (2023–24)
- Jonathan Meyer (1992), general counsel of the U.S. Department of Homeland Security (2021–2024)
- Leonard P. Moore, U.S. attorney for the Eastern District of New York (1953–57)
- Irvin B. Nathan, attorney general of the District of Columbia, general counsel of the United States House of Representatives
- Shirah Neiman (1968), deputy U.S. attorney and chief counsel, U.S. Attorney's Office for the Southern District of New York
- Rudolph Douglas Raiford, first African-American chief of Labor Relations, United States Department of Housing and Urban Development
- Barbara Ringer (1949), first female register of Copyrights, United States Copyright Office (1973–80); key contributor to preparation and passage of Copyright Act of 1976
- George L. Rives (B.A. 1868, LL.M. 1873), U.S. assistant secretary of state (1887–89)
- Benito Romano (J.D. 1976), first Puerto Rican to serve as U.S. attorney for the Southern District of New York (on an interim basis)
- Charles Ruff (1963), U.S. attorney for the District of Columbia; in Watergate scandal, special prosecutor who investigated President Richard Nixon; represented Anita Hill during the Clarence Thomas Supreme Court nomination and confirmation hearings in the Senate; defended President Bill Clinton in the 1999 impeachment proceedings
- Whitney North Seymour (1923), assistant U.S. solicitor general (1931–33)
- Andrew J. Shapiro (1994), assistant secretary of state for Political-Military Affairs, United States Department of State (2009–); senior adviser, Secretary of State Hillary Clinton
- Charles H. Tuttle (LL.B. 1902), U.S. attorney for the Southern District of New York (1927–30)
- Donald Verrilli (1983), associate deputy attorney general of the United States in the administration of President Barack Obama (2009–11)
- David Vladeck (1976), director of the Bureau of Consumer Protection, Federal Trade Commission (2009–)
- Lawrence E. Walsh (1935), independent prosecutor for the Iran-Contra Affair, Trustee of Columbia University
- Paul Warnke, assistant secretary of Defense, International Security Affairs (1967–69); general counsel, U.S. secretary of Defense under President Lyndon Johnson
- Charles Warren (S.J.D. 1933), assistant attorney general of the United States (1914–18), drafted Espionage Act of 1917
- Mary Jo White (1974), first female U.S. attorney for the Southern District of New York (1993–2002)
- Edward Baldwin Whitney, assistant attorney general of the United States

==== State government ====
===== Governors =====
- Steve Bullock (1994), 24th governor of Montana (2013–); attorney general of Montana (2009–13)
- Doyle E. Carlton (1902), 25th governor of Florida (1929–33)
- Colgate Darden (1923), 54th governor of Virginia (1942–46), U.S. congressman from Virginia (1933–37, 1939–41); chancellor, College of William and Mary (1946–47); president, University of Virginia (1947–59); namesake of the Darden Graduate School of Business Administration
- Gray Davis (1967), 37th governor of California (1999–2003), lieutenant governor (1995–99) California state controller (1987–95)
- Westmoreland Davis (1886), 48th governor of Virginia (1918–22)
- Thomas E. Dewey (1925), 47th governor of New York (1942–55), Manhattan district attorney (1937–42), Republican nominee for president of the United States (1944, 1948), name partner of New York law firm Dewey Ballantine
- Horace F. Graham, 56th governor of Vermont (1917–19)
- Charles Evans Hughes (1884), 36th governor of New York (1907); professor, Cornell Law School, associate justice of the Supreme Court (1910–16), Republican nominee for president of the United States (1916), US secretary of state (1921–29), and chief justice of the Supreme Court (1930–41)
- John Jay (1764), second governor of New York
- Ruby Laffoon (attended), 43rd governor of Kentucky (1931–35)
- John W. King (1943), 71st governor of New Hampshire (1963–69)
- Robert Baumle Meyner (1933), 44th governor of New Jersey (1952–62)
- George Pataki (1970), 63rd governor of New York (1994–2006)
- George P. Wetmore (1869), 37th governor of Rhode Island
- Horace White (attended), 37th governor of New York and lieutenant governor

===== State attorneys general =====
- Dean Alfange (1925), deputy New York State attorney general; founding member of the Liberal Party of New York
- Daniel P. Baldwin (1860), Indiana attorney general (1880–1882)
- Margery Bronster (1982), Hawaii attorney general (1995–99)
- Steve Bullock (1994), attorney general of Montana (2009–13)
- Samuel P. Colt (1876), attorney general of Rhode Island (1882–?)
- Herbert F. DeSimone (1954), attorney general of Rhode Island and assistant secretary of Transportation
- Slade Gorton (1953), Washington attorney general (1969–81), former U.S. senator from Washington
- Theodore E. Hancock (1873), New York State attorney general (1894–98)
- Peter C. Harvey (1982), first African-American to serve as attorney general of New Jersey (2003–06)
- Richard C. Hunter (1911), attorney general of Nebraska (1937–39), former U.S. senator from Nebraska
- Julius Marshuetz Mayer, New York State attorney general (1905–06)
- Robert H. McCarter (1882), attorney general of New Jersey (1903–08)
- Thomas N. McCarter, attorney general of New Jersey (1902–03)
- John T. McDonough (1861), New York State attorney general (1899–1902)
- Richard M. Milburn, attorney general of Indiana (January 1915-November 1915)
- Irvin B. Nathan (1967), former attorney general of the District of Columbia; former general counsel, United States House of Representatives; Abscam lawyer for House
- Edmund Wilson, Sr., attorney general of New Jersey (1908–14)

===== State judges, politicians and others =====
- Sheila Abdus-Salaam (1977), judge, New York Court of Appeals (highest court in the State of New York) (2013–2017), first African-American woman on the court; justice, Appellate Division of the Supreme Court, First Judicial Department (2009–2013)
- Rolando T. Acosta (1982), justice of the Appellate Division of the Supreme Court, First Judicial Department (2008–)
- William Shankland Andrews (1882), judge, New York Court of Appeals (1917–28), where he dissented from several opinions by noted fellow judge and Columbia Law graduate Benjamin Cardozo
- Richard Andrias (1970), justice of the Appellate Division of the Supreme Court, First Judicial Department (2008–)
- Matthew Boxer, first New Jersey State comptroller
- Charles D. Breitel, chief judge, New York Court of Appeals (1974–78)
- Albert Burstein, member of the New Jersey General Assembly
- Benjamin Cardozo (1889–91), chief judge and judge, New York Court of Appeals; associate justice, U.S. Supreme Court; namesake of Benjamin N. Cardozo School of Law
- Lewis Stuyvesant Chanler (LL.B. 1891), lieutenant governor of New York (1907–08)
- William N. Cohen (1881), justice, New York Supreme Court
- Frederick E. Crane, former chief judge and judge, New York Court of Appeals
- John Watts de Peyster (studied at the Law School), brevet major general in the New York Militia
- John Watts de Peyster, Jr. (studied at the Law School), brevet brigadier general in the New York Militia
- Leo C. Dessar (1870), member of the New York State Assembly (1875), District Court judge (1884–1887)
- Justin Fairfax (2005), 41st lieutenant governor of Virginia
- Edward R. Finch (1898), former judge, New York Court of Appeals
- Ralph Adam Fine, judge, Wisconsin Court of Appeals (1988–)
- Hamilton Fish II (1873), speaker of the New York State Assembly (1895–96)
- James Greeley Flanders (1869), former member of the Wisconsin State Assembly
- Alfred Frankenthaler (1903), former judge, New York Supreme Court
- Charles Fried, associate justice of the Massachusetts Supreme Judicial Court (highest court in the Commonwealth of Massachusetts)
- Stanley Fuld (1926), former chief judge and judge, New York Court of Appeals
- Luis A. Gonzalez (1975), presiding justice of the Appellate Division of the Supreme Court, First Judicial Department (2009–), justice (2002–09)
- John Manning Hall (1868), speaker of the Connecticut House of Representatives (1882), president pro tempore of the Connecticut State Senate (1889), and Connecticut Superior Court judge (1889–1893)
- William B. Hornblower (1875), former judge, New York Court of Appeals
- George Landon Ingraham (1869), presiding justice of the Appellate Division of the Supreme Court, First Judicial Department (1910–15), justice (1896–1910)
- Roderick L. Ireland (1969), chief justice (2010–), associate justice (1997–10), Massachusetts Supreme Judicial Court; 1st African-American chief justice, Massachusetts high court
- Almet Francis Jenks (1877), presiding justice of the Appellate Division of the Supreme Court, Second Judicial Department (1911–12, 1912–21), justice (1905–11)
- Benjamin Kaplan, associate justice of the Massachusetts Supreme Judicial Court (1972–8) and later on the Massachusetts Appeals Court
- Frank S. Katzenbach, associate justice of the New Jersey Supreme Court (highest court in the State of New Jersey)
- Steve Kelley, former Minnesota state senator, Minnesota House of Representatives, current director of the Center for Science, Technology, and Public Policy at the Humphrey Institute of Public Affairs at the University of Minnesota
- Edward Kent, Jr. (1887), the final chief justice of the Arizona Territorial Supreme Court
- Walter M. D. Kern (1962), politician, served in the New Jersey General Assembly 1978–1990, where he represented the 40th Legislative District
- Randall B. Kester (1940), associate justice of the Oregon Supreme Court (highest court in the state of Oregon) (1957–58)
- John King, chief justice (1981–86) and justice (1979–81), New Hampshire Supreme Court (highest court in the State of New Hampshire)
- Charles J. Kurth (1862–1896), lawyer and member of the New York State Assembly
- Rory Lancman, member of the New York City Council, representing the 24th Council District since 2014, former member of the New York State Assembly
- Benjamin M. Lawsky (B.A., J.D.), first superintendent, New York State Department of Financial Services (2011–); investigated Standard Chartered
- Edward Lazansky (B.A. 1985, J.D. 1897), justice of the New York Supreme Court, Appellate Division (1926–43); secretary of state of New York (1911–12)
- Edgar J. Lauer (1891), former justice, New York Supreme Court
- Irving Lehman (1897), former chief judge and judge, New York Court of Appeals
- Angela Mazzarelli (1971), justice of the Appellate Division of the Supreme Court, First Judicial Department (1994–)
- Ben McAdams (2003), rising Utah state senator
- George Z. Medalie (1907), former judge, New York Court of Appeals
- Lindsey Miller-Lerman (1973), justice, Nebraska Supreme Court (highest Court in the State of Nebraska) (1998–), former judge, Nebraska State Court of Appeals
- Karla Moskowitz (1966), justice of the Appellate Division of the Supreme Court, First Judicial Department (2008–)
- Edgar J. Nathan (1916), Manhattan borough president and judge of the New York Supreme Court
- Flemming L. Norcott, Jr. (B.A. 1965, J.D. 1968), associate justice, Connecticut Supreme Court (1992–); associate fellow, Calhoun College, Yale University
- Charles J. O'Byrne (1984), secretary to the governor of New York David Paterson (2008)
- James E.C. Perry (1972), justice of the Florida Supreme Court (highest court in the State of Florida) (2009–)
- Jennifer Rivera (LL.M. 1993), judge, New York Court of Appeals (2013–)
- Thomas G. Saylor (1972), justice of the Supreme Court of Pennsylvania (highest court in the State of Pennsylvania) (1997–)
- Robert S. Smith (1968), judge, New York Court of Appeals (2003–)
- Calvert Spensley (1869), member of the Wisconsin State Senate (1893–96)
- Aron Steuer (LL.B. 1923), justice of the New York State Supreme Court, Appellate Division, First Department
- Theodore L. Stiles (1872), one of the first justices of the Washington Supreme Court (highest court in the State of Washington) (1889–95)
- Arthur T. Vanderbilt, chief justice, New Jersey Supreme Court (1948–57)
- Richard Wilde Walker, Jr. (attended), associate justice of the Alabama Supreme Court (highest court in the State of Alabama) (1914–36)
- Eric T. Washington (1979), chief judge (2005–), District of Columbia Court of Appeals (highest court in the District of Columbia) (1999–)
- John Webb, associate justice of the North Carolina Supreme Court (highest court in the state in State of North Carolina) (1986–98)
- Charles Weltner (1950), chief justice of the Supreme Court of Georgia (highest court in the U.S. state of Georgia) (1981–92)
- Robert Wilentz, chief justice of the New Jersey Supreme Court (1979–96)
- Peter Woodbury, associate justice of the New Hampshire Supreme Court (highest court in the State of New Hampshire) (1933–41)

==== City and county government ====
- Charles d'Autremont (1875), former mayor of Duluth, Minnesota
- Hugh H. Bownes (1948), former mayor of Laconia, New Hampshire
- Michael A. Cardozo (1966), corporation counsel of New York City (2002–present)
- James Dickson Carr (1896), assistant district attorney, New York County (1899–1901)
- Maurice E. Connolly, borough president of Queens, New York (1911–28)
- Charles L. Craig (1872–1935), New York City comptroller
- Rocky Delgadillo (1986), city attorney of Los Angeles; first Latino in over 100 years to be elected citywide in Los Angeles
- Thomas Dewey (1925), former Manhattan district attorney
- William Henry Eustis (1874), mayor of Minneapolis (1893–95)
- Hugh J. Grant, mayor of New York City (1889–92, two terms); remains youngest mayor in the city's history
- Thomas Gulotta (1969), county executive of Nassau County, New York (1987–2001)
- Rudolph Halley (1933), former president of the New York City Council
- Walter Foxcroft Hawkins (1886), former mayor of Pittsfield, the largest city and traditional county seat of Massachusetts' Berkshire County
- Frank S. Katzenbach, former mayor of Trenton, New Jersey; justice, New Jersey Supreme Court
- George Latimer, mayor of Saint Paul, Minnesota (1976–90); regent of the University of Minnesota
- Charles Meeker, mayor of Raleigh, North Carolina (2001–current)
- Constance Baker Motley (1946), first African-American female Manhattan borough president (1964–66); attorney, NAACP Legal Defense and Educational Fund (1946–64)
- De Lancey Nicoll (1876) New York County district attorney (1891–93)
- William M.K. Olcott, New York County district attorney (1897–98)
- George Pataki (1970), former mayor of Peekskill, New York; former governor of New York
- Eugene A. Philbin (1885), New York County district attorney (1899–1901)
- Robert Price, deputy mayor of New York City under John Lindsay
- Louise Renne (1961), former mayor San Francisco (1978–86); first female city attorney, City and County of San Francisco (1978–01)
- Janette Sadik-Khan, current commissioner of the New York City Department of Transportation (2007–)
- Percy Hamilton Stewart (1893), former mayor of Plainfield, New Jersey
- Andrew H. Warren (2002), state attorney of Florida's 13th Judicial Circuit, Hillsborough County (2017–22)
- Terence M. Zaleski, first strong-mayor of the city of Yonkers since World War II (1992–95)

=== Non-U.S. government ===
==== Prominent political figures ====
- Giuliano Amato (LL.M. 1963), twice prime minister of Italy (2000–01; 1992–93), twice Italian minister of Foreign Affairs (secretary of state) (2001 and 1992), minister of the Exchequer and deputy prime minister (1987–89), Italian minister of the Interior (2006–08), president of the Council of Ministers of Italy (2000–01; 1992–93), minister for Institutional Reforms (1998–99), minister of the Exchequer, Budget and Economic Programming (1999–2000), member of the Italian Senate (2001–06), member of the Italian Chamber of Deputies (2006–08; 1993–94), vice president of the Convention on the Future of Europe (2001–03)
- Dionysia-Theodora Avgerinopoulou (J.S.D. 2011), member, Hellenic Parliament since the 2009 legislative election
- Radhika Coomaraswamy, appointed by United Nations Secretary-General Kofi Annan as under secretary-general, special representative, Children and Armed Conflict (2006)
- Ronald Duterte (LL.M.), former mayor of Cebu City, Philippines (1983–86)
- Francesco Paolo Fulci (LL.M.), Italian diplomat, former permanent representative of Italy to the United Nations (1993–99)
- Kim Hyun-jong (J.D. 1985), former South Korean minister for Trade (cabinet) in the administration of President Roh Moo-hyun (2004–07); former South Korean ambassador and permanent representative to the United Nations (2007–09)
- Marvic Mario Victor F. Leonen (LL.M.), chief peace negotiator for the Republic of the Philippines (2010–12)
- Sean Lien (LL.M.), current member of the Central Standing Committee of the Kuomintang, the current ruling party in Taiwan
- Daryl Mundis, senior trial attorney, International Criminal Tribunal for the former Yugoslavia at The Hague
- Jim Peterson (LL.M.), Canadian retired politician, former minister of International Trade (cabinet) (2003–06), secretary of state (sub-cabinet) (1997–2007), member of Parliament in the House of Commons of Canada (1988–2007; 1981–83)
- Mikhail Saakashvili (LL.M. 1994), third president, Georgia (2005–present), former minister of Justice
- Lorrin A. Thurston (LL.B.), Kingdom of Hawaii minister of Interior (1887–90)

==== Prominent judicial figures ====
- Salahuddin Ahmad (LL.M. 1970), attorney general of Bangladesh (2008–09)
- Giuliano Amato (LL.M.), member, Constitutional Court of Italy (2013–)
- Joaquim Barbosa (visiting scholar, CLS, 1999, 2000), chief justice of Brazil (2012–); only black Supreme Federal Court justice minister in Brazil
- Karin Maria Bruzelius (LL.M. 1969), justice, Supreme Court of Sweden (highest court in the country of Sweden) (1997–); Swedish under secretary of state (first woman to hold such a position) (1989–97), Swedish deputy under secretary of state (1979–83)
- Lawrence Collins, Baron Collins of Mapesbury (LL.M.), former member, Supreme Court of the United Kingdom (2009–11); Lord of Appeal in Ordinary (2009); Lord Justice of Appeal (2007–09); Judicial Committee of the Privy Council (see the Privy Council) (February 2007–); judge, High Court of England and Wales (2000)
- Ernest Howard Crosby (LL.B.), judge in First Instance, Alexandria, Egypt (1887–89)
- Susan Denham (LL.M.), chief justice (2011–), associate justice (1992–2011), Supreme Court of Ireland, first female chief justice; longest-serving member of court
- Jaime Fuster (LL.M. 1966), associate justice, Supreme Court of Puerto Rico (highest court of the island) (1992–2007)
- Charles Evans Hughes, judge, Permanent Court of International Justice in The Hague, The Netherlands (1928–30)
- V. K. Wellington Koo (PhD 1912), International Court of Justice (1956–67)
- Marvic Mario Victor F. Leonen (LL.M. 2004), associate justice, Supreme Court of the Philippines (country's highest court) (2012–)
- Mark MacGuigan (LL.M., J.S.D.), attorney general of Canada, also Canadian minister of Justice (1982–84); Canadian secretary of state for External Affairs (1980–82)
- Liana Fiol Matta (LL.M., S.J.D.), second woman in Puerto Rican history to serve as associate justice, Supreme Court of Puerto Rico (as of 2011)
- John T. McDonough (LL.B. 1861), appointed by President Theodore Roosevelt as Associate Justice, Supreme Court of the Philippines (the country's highest court)
- George Moe (LL.M.), chief justice, Supreme Court of Belize (1982–85); justice, Eastern Caribbean Supreme Court (1985–91)
- Githu Muigai (LL.M. 1986), current attorney general, Kenya (August 2011–)
- Rocky Pollack, Canadian judge, member of the Manitoba Securities Commission (2002–06)
- Shi Jiuyong (LL.M. 1951), former president, U.N. International Court of Justice (2003–10); former chairman, International Law Commission
- Francis M. Ssekandi (LL.M.), former justice, Supreme Court of Uganda (highest court in the country of Uganda); judge, World Bank Administrative Tribunal (2007–)
- Hironobu Takesaki (LL.M. 1971), 17th chief justice of the Supreme Court of Japan (highest court in the country of Japan) (2008–)
- Umu Hawa Tejan-Jalloh (LL.M.), chief justice (2008–), associate justice (2002–08), Supreme Court of Sierra Leone
- Xue Hanqin (LL.M. 1983, J.S.D. 1995), judge, U.N. International Court of Justice (2010–); Chinese diplomat and international law expert
- Richard W. Young (LL.B. 1884), appointed by President William McKinley as associate justice, Supreme Court of the Philippines; U.S. Army brigadier general

== Academia ==
=== University presidents ===
- Carmen Twillie Ambar (1994), president, Cedar Crest College (2008–present); former head (2002–07) and dean (2007–08), Douglass College (former New Jersey College for Women) (independent college from 1918 to 2007)
- Lee Bollinger (1971), president, University of Michigan (1996–2002); president, Columbia University (2002–present); professor (1973–94) and dean (1987–94), University of Michigan Law School; provost, Dartmouth College (1994–96); chair, Federal Reserve Bank of New York (2011)
- Colin G. Campbell, 13th president, Wesleyan University
- Colgate Darden (1923), president, College of William and Mary (1946–47); president, University of Virginia (1947–59); namesake of the Darden Graduate School of Business Administration; congressman from Virginia (1933–37, 1939–41); governor of Virginia (1942–46)
- Ellen V. Futter (1974), president, Barnard College (1980–93); president, American Museum of Natural History
- E. Gordon Gee (1971), president, West Virginia University (1981–85), University of Colorado at Boulder (1985–90), Ohio State University (1990–97), Brown University (1997–2000), Vanderbilt University (2000–07), and Ohio State University (2007–present)
- Frank Johnson Goodnow (1882), first president, Johns Hopkins University
- Samuel Hoi, president, Otis College of Art and Design (2000–)
- George Latimer, regent, University of Minnesota
- Samuel Laws, president, University of Missouri (1876–89); president, Westminster College, Missouri (1854–61)
- Frank Macchiarola, chancellor (2008–), president (1996–2008), St. Francis College
- Barry Mills (1979), president, Bowdoin College (2001–present)
- Stuart Rabinowitz, eighth president, Hofstra University (2000–present), former Hofstra School of Law dean
- Emanuel Rackman (1910–2008), Modern Orthodox rabbi; president of Bar-Ilan University
- Mitchell Reiss (J.D.), 27th president of Washington College (2010–)
- Michael I. Sovern (1955), president, Columbia University (1980–93); professor (1957–present) and dean (1970–79), Columbia Law School; chairman, Sotheby's (2002–present)
- Hiram F. Stevens (1874), one of the five founders of William Mitchell College of Law
- Norman Adrian Wiggins (LL.M., S.J.D.), chancellor and president, Campbell College (subsequently Campbell University) (1967–2003)

=== Legal academia ===
- Penelope Andrews (LL.M.), dean of Albany Law School; professor of law, South African constitutional law
- Fionnuala Ní Aoláin (LL.M.), Northern Ireland professor of law, University of Ulster, specializing in human rights law
- Nina Appel (1959), legal scholar and first female dean of Loyola Law School
- Donna Arzt (LL.M.), longtime professor of law, Syracuse University College of Law, human rights law, Director of the Center for Global Law and Practice
- John F. Banzhaf III (1965), professor and practitioner of public interest law, George Washington University School of Law
- Mark Barnes (LL.M.), expert on healthcare law, public health, managed care law, and law and medicine
- Barbara Aronstein Black (1955), first woman to head an Ivy League law school; professor and dean, Columbia Law; contracts and legal history
- Lee Bollinger (1971), dean (1987–94), professor (1973–94), University of Michigan Law School; provost of Dartmouth College (1994–96); president, University of Michigan (1996–02); president, Columbia University (2002–); defendant in the Supreme Court case Grutter v. Bollinger (2003); scholar of First Amendment and freedom of speech
- Lea Brilmayer (LL.M.), Howard M. Holtzmann Professor of International Law, Yale Law School
- Alexandra Carter, clinical law professor, mediator, media personality, negotiation trainer and author
- Alta Charo (1982), professor of Law and Bioethics, University of Wisconsin–Madison; appointments in both Wisconsin's law and medical schools
- Felix S. Cohen (1931), expert on Native American law, legal philosopher; professor, Yale Law School; early proponent of legal realism
- Morris L. Cohen (1951), "one of the nation's most influential legal librarians" and professor of law, University of Pennsylvania, Harvard Law School, Yale Law School
- Lawrence Collins (LL.M.), co-author of standard reference work on conflict of laws (since 1987); author, many other books, articles on private international law; English judge
- Robert Cover (1968), professor, Columbia Law (1971–72) and Yale Law School (1972–86); scholar of history, philosophy, literature, and law
- Brainerd Currie (LL.M.), noted for his work in conflict of laws and for his creation of the concept of governmental interests analysis; dean, University of Pittsburgh School of Law; professor, University of Chicago Law School, Duke Law School; considered the poet laureate of law professors; namesake of annual Brainerd Currie Memorial Lecture
- Eduardo De Los Angeles (1970), dean and professor of law, Ateneo Law School (Philippines); president, Philippine Stock Exchange
- Paul Demaret (LL.M.), rector, College of Europe (Bruges, Belgium), director of Legal Studies; former professor, University of Liège
- Donald L. Drakeman, fellow, Judge Business School, Cambridge University; former faculty member, Princeton University (courses and seminars on U. S. civil liberties)
- Samuel Estreicher (B.A. 1970, J.D. 1975), Dwight D. Opperman Professor of Law, New York University School of Law, director of its Center for Labor and Employment
- E. Allan Farnsworth (1952), expert on the law of contracts and professor, Columbia Law (1952–2004)
- Nathan Feinsinger (Law, post-graduate study); expert, labor law; professor, University of Wisconsin Law School, arbitrated a number of national labor disputes
- Robert Isaac Field, expert in many areas of health care law and regulation
- Claire Finkelstein, professor at the University of Pennsylvania Law School
- Edward Foley, theorist of the blue shift and former Ohio Solicitor General
- Marvin E. Frankel (1948), professor, Columbia Law, federal judge, partner at Kramer Levin Naftalis & Frankel (1983–2002)
- Charles Fried (1960), professor, Harvard Law (1961–87, 1989–95, 1999–present), U.S. Solicitor General (1985–89)
- Michael Geist, Canadian legal academic in internet and E-Commerce law at the University of Ottawa
- Ruth Bader Ginsburg, first woman on both Columbia and Harvard Law Reviews; professor, Rutgers School of Law–Newark; first woman granted tenure, Columbia Law; co-founded Women's Rights Law Reporter; Associate Justice, United States Supreme Court
- Harvey Goldschmid (1965), professor, Columbia Law and expert on securities law
- Paul Goldstein (1967), professor, Stanford Law School and expert copyright law
- Lino Graglia (1954), professor, University of Texas specializing in antitrust litigation; critic of affirmative action, racial quotas, and some aspects of judicial review; failed nomination, United States Court of Appeals for the Fifth Circuit
- R. Kent Greenawalt (1963), professor, Columbia Law; fellow, Clare Hall, Cambridge University (1972–73); fellow, All Souls College, Oxford University (1979); main interests legal philosophy, civil rights; former deputy solicitor general of the United States
- Jack Greenberg (1948), dean (1989–93), professor (1984–), Columbia Law; Presidential Citizens Medal; counsel and second president, director-counsel, NAACP Legal Defense and Educational Fund (1949–84), in which capacity he argued Brown v. Board of Education (1954); argued 40 civil rights cases before the U.S. Supreme Court
- William Dameron Guthrie, legal educator and lawyer; Storrs Lecturer, Yale University; professor, Columbia Law; author of legal treatises
- James C. Hathaway (LL.M., J.S.D.), legal scholar in the field of international refugee law
- John D. Hawke, Jr. (1969), legal scholar in federal regulation of financial institutions, author of Commentaries on Banking Regulation (1985)
- Alfred Hayes, Jr. (1889), professor, Cornell Law School (1907–17); Progressive Era advocate for Theodore Roosevelt's Progressive Party and the Bull Moose initiative
- Geoffrey C. Hazard, Jr. (1954), Sterling Professor, emeritus, Yale Law School; Trustee Professor of Law, University of Pennsylvania Law School
- Charles Evans Hughes (1884), professor, Cornell Law School; United States secretary of state; associate and chief justice, U.S. Supreme Court
- Huger Jervey, dean (1924–28), Columbia Law (succeeded Harlan Fiske Stone), professor (1923 to 1949)
- Sanford H. Kadish (1948), influential professor of Criminal Law, University of California, Berkeley
- Yale Kamisar (1955), expert on criminal law and professor, University of Michigan Law School (1965–present)
- Benjamin Kaplan (1933), Royall Professor of Law, emeritus, Harvard Law School, copyright scholar and jurist
- John Marshall Kernochan, law professor; founded Columbia Law's Kernochan Center for Law, Media and the Arts; pioneering work in intellectual property law
- Marvic Mario Victor F. Leonen (LL.M.), dean (2008–11), law professor, University of the Philippines College of Law
- Howard Lesnick (LLB 1958), Jefferson B. Fordham Professor of Law Emeritus, University of Pennsylvania Law School
- Victor Hao Li (J.D. 1964), professor at Stanford Law School, president of East–West Center (1981–1990)
- Jessica Litman, expert on copyright law, professor, University of Michigan Law School
- Louis Lusky (1937), pioneer in field of civil rights law; former professor, Columbia Law
- Gerard E. Lynch (1975), vice dean (1992–97), professor, Columbia Law; primary scholarly interests include criminal law and procedure, sentencing, and professional responsibility; judge, United States Court of Appeals for the Second Circuit (2009–)
- Wendy Mariner, internationally recognized authority in health law, published more than 100 articles in the legal, medical and health policy literature
- Harold Medina (1912), professor, Columbia Law (1912–47); lawyer; judge, federal trial court ('47–51), federal appellate court ('51–80); cover of Time magazine, 1949
- Soia Mentschikoff (1937), drafter, Uniform Commercial Code; first woman to teach at Harvard Law School; dean, University of Miami School of Law
- Gillian Metzger (1995), professor, Columbia Law
- Alan C. Michaels (1986), dean, Ohio State University Moritz College of Law (2008–present)
- Dorothy Miner (1961), helped develop nationwide legal protections for historic landmarks, professor of law
- Richard B. Morris, historian, legal scholar, best known for his pioneering work in colonial American legal history
- Trevor Morrison (1998), dean, New York University School of Law (May 31, 2013–); associate White House counsel, President Barack Obama (2009–10)
- Wayne Morse (J.S.D. 1932), dean and professor, University of Oregon School of Law
- Robert Pitofsky, dean, Georgetown University Law Center; professor of law, leading scholar in the area of trade regulation; former chairman, U.S. Federal Trade Commission
- S. Jay Plager (LL.M. 1961), former dean and professor, Indiana University Maurer School of Law (1977–84)
- Mitchell Reiss (J.D.), vice-provost of International Affairs and professor, William and Mary Law School
- Lawrence Sager (1966), dean, University of Texas Law School (2006–present); longtime professor, New York University Law School; visiting professor, Harvard Law School, University of Michigan Law School, Princeton University; one of the nation's preeminent constitutional theorists and scholars
- Rudolf Schlesinger (1942), professor, Cornell Law School, seminal work in comparative law
- Whitney North Seymour (1923), professor, Yale Law School and New York University, assistant U.S. solicitor general (1931–33)
- Hans Smit (LL.B. 1958), professor at Columbia Law School, expert on international law
- Munroe Smith (1877), pioneering work in comparative jurisprudence, a founder of Political Science Quarterly; dean, School of Mines
- Michael I. Sovern (1955), dean (1970–79) and professor (1957–present), Columbia Law; president, Columbia University (1980–93); chairman, Sotheby's (2002–present), scholar of labor law; expert on employment discrimination
- Stewart Sterk, professor, Benjamin N. Cardozo School of Law, leading casebook on trusts and estates
- Hiram F. Stevens (1874), first dean, William Mitchell College of Law; professor, University of Minnesota Law School
- Clyde Wilson Summers (LL.M. 1946, S.J.D. 1952), professor, Yale Law School (1956–75); professor, University of Pennsylvania Law School (1975–05); helped write Labor Management Reporting and Disclosure Act
- Stanley S. Surrey (J.D. 1932), tax law scholar known as "a dean of the academic tax bar" and "the greatest tax scholar of his generation"
- K. A. Taipale (LL.M.), lawyer, scholar, and social theorist specializing in information, technology, and national security policy
- Paul Tappan (J.S.D. 1945), criminologist; professor of Law and Criminology at the UC Berkeley School of Law
- Arthur T. Vanderbilt, served for many years as dean of the New York University School of Law, currently housed in a building that bears his name; on two separate occasions he declined to be considered for nominations to the United States Supreme Court; chief justice of the New Jersey Supreme Court (1948–57)
- Judith Vladeck (1957), legal scholar, attorney; helped set new legal precedents against sex discrimination and age discrimination
- Charles Warren (1933), legal scholar, Pulitzer Prize for History (Supreme Court in United States History)
- Amy Wax (J.D. 1987), Robert Mundheim Professor of Law at the University of Pennsylvania Law School
- Herbert Wechsler (1931), professor, Columbia Law (1933–78); director, American Law Institute (1963–84); argued in U.S. Supreme Court the seminal libel case New York Times v. Sullivan (1964); known for his constitutional law scholarship and creation of the Model Penal Code
- Jack B. Weinstein, professor, Columbia Law (1952–98), author of a leading treatise on evidence; judge, United States District Court for the Eastern District of New York
- Mark D. West (J.D. 1993), dean (2013–) and professor, University of Michigan Law School, widely published on subject of Japanese law and the Japanese legal system
- Louis Westerfield (LL.M. 1980), professor and first African-American dean, University of Mississippi School of Law (1994–96)
- Steven Winter, Walter S. Gibbs Professor of Constitutional Law at Wayne State University Law School
- George Winterton (J.S.D.), professor of Constitutional Law at the University of Sydney, University of New South Wales
- Harold Wren (1921–2016), dean of three law schools

== Arts and letters ==
- John Kendrick Bangs (1883–84), writer and satirist associated with so-called "Bangsian fantasy"
- Alfred Bester (dropped out), science fiction author, TV and radio scriptwriter, magazine editor, Hugo Award
- Charles Chaille-Long (1880), writer, explorer of Africa, soldier
- Da Chen, Chinese author; Brothers awarded best book of 2006 by Publishers Weekly and The Washington Post
- Thomas Frederick Crane, folklorist, academic at Cornell University, lawyer
- Ernest Howard Crosby, author
- John Watts de Peyster (studied at the Law School), author on the art of war, military history and biography; also published drama, poetry, military criticism
- Bruce Ducker (1964), novelist, Pulitzer Prize-nominated, Colorado Book Award
- Freddie Gershon, published author of hugely successful roman à clef concerning the music industry (in the 1960s through the 1980s)
- William Francis Gibbs (LL.B., M.A.), renowned naval architect
- Martin Gottfried, critic, drama critic, columnist and author
- Isaac Hollister Hall (1865), famed Orientalist and curator of the Metropolitan Museum of Art (1885–96)
- Thomas Hauser (1970), award-winning author; 1991 William Hill Sports Book of the Year; Pulitzer Prize-nominated
- Eddie Hayes, memoirist
- Arthur Garfield Hays (1905), author of numerous books and articles
- William Ivins, Jr. (1907), curator of prints at the Metropolitan Museum of Art (1916–46), author
- Speight Jenkins (1961), arts administrator, general director of the Seattle Opera (1983–)
- Tudor Jenks (1880), author, poet, artist, editor, lawyer
- Caroline Kennedy (1988), writer, editor, author of seven best selling books (including two on civil liberties), attorney; daughter of President John F. Kennedy
- John Marshall Kernochan, law professor, composer, and music publisher
- Gustav Kobbe (1879), music critic and author, best known for his guide to opera, The Complete Opera Book
- Hamilton Wright Mabie (1869), essayist, critic, and lecturer
- Brander Matthews (1873), writer and educator, first U.S. professor of dramatic literature, Legion of Honor
- Brad Meltzer (1996), New York Times best-selling novelist, DC Comics author, and co-creator of the television series Jack & Bobby
- Duffield Osborne (1881), author
- Edward Packard, children's author who developed the "choose your own adventure" style of storytelling
- Isaac Rice (1880), author, inventor, and chess patron
- James N. Rosenberg (1898). artist
- Karenna Gore Schiff (2000), author, journalist, attorney, daughter of Vice-President Al Gore
- Eugene Schuyler (1863), translator of Ivan Turgenev and Leo Tolstoi, writer, scholar
- Paula Sharp, author, translator
- Gerald Tomlinson, writer of mysteries and books on baseball and other topics
- Arthur Dudley Vinton, author and lawyer
- Charles Warren (S.J.D.), Pulitzer Prize for History
- Manly Wade Wellman, writer, recipient of Edgar Allan Poe Award
- Daniel R. White (1979), lawyer, humorist, writer, editor; best known as the author of The Official Lawyer's Handbook, a satire of the legal profession, and White's Law Dictionary, a parody of Black's Law Dictionary
- Charles Yu, writer; 2020 National Book Award winner (fiction) for Interior Chinatown, 2007 National Book Foundation "5 Under 35" Award; How to Live Safely, runner up, 2011 Campbell Memorial Award

== Performing arts ==
- Suchindra Bali, Tamil actor
- Leonard Cohen (1956–57), Canadian singer-songwriter, musician, poet and novelist
- Wafah Dufour (LL.M.), singer/songwriter
- Eric Eisner (1973), lawyer, former president of The Geffen Company and founder of the Young Eisner Scholars program
- Alonzo Elliot, composer and songwriter (studied with Nadia Boulanger and Leonard Bernstein)
- Oscar Hammerstein II², writer, producer, and director of musicals, awarded two Academy Awards, two Pulitzer Prizes, and nine Tony Awards
- Hoyt Hilsman, screenwriter, playwright and critic
- Howard Koch, blacklisted in the 1950s, work includes Casablanca (1942) (for which he received an Academy Award), The War of the Worlds (1936), Letter to an Unknown Woman (1948)
- Robinne Lee, actress, Seven Pounds (2008) with Will Smith, Hav Plenty (1997)
- Rod MacDonald (1973), singer/songwriter
- Abraham Polonsky (1935), Academy Award-nominated screenwriter blacklisted in the 1950s
- Paul Robeson (1923), actor of stage and film, singer (opera, lieder, international folk music, spirituals), and writer; fluent or near fluent in 12 languages
- Tom Rothman (1980), co-chairman and CEO of Fox Filmed Entertainment
- Nick Santora (1996), writer (The Sopranos, Law & Order), producer (Prison Break) and novelist
- Franklin Schaffner (legal education interrupted by service during World War II), Academy Award-winning film director
- Stephen Strimpell, actor of stage and film

== Business and philanthropy ==
- Dan Abrams (1992), general manager of MSNBC; formerly chief legal correspondent for NBC News and host of The Abrams Report
- William Waldorf Astor (1875), Anglo-American financier, son of John Jacob Astor, US minister to Italy (1881–85)
- Mark Attanasio (1982), investment banker and owner of the Milwaukee Brewers (since 2004, incumbent as of 2011)
- Roland W. Betts (1978), investor, film producer, lead owner in George W. Bush's Texas Rangers partnership (1989–98), and developer and owner of Chelsea Piers (1989–)
- Douglas Black (1918), president of Doubleday (1946–63)
- Frank Blake (1976), CEO of Home Depot (2007–)
- Bruce Buck (1970), chairman of Chelsea F.C. (2003–)
- Stephen Carlton Clark (1907), Singer Sewing Machine heir, founder of the Baseball Hall of Fame and other Cooperstown, New York cultural institutions
- Alan N. Cohen (1954), chairman, CEO, Madison Square Garden Corp. (1974–77); former principal owner, New Jersey Nets, Boston Celtics, New York Knicks, New York Rangers
- Luca Cordero di Montezemolo, president and CEO of Ferrari
- Philippe Dauman (1978), president and CEO of Viacom, parent company of Paramount Pictures and MTV Networks
- Bruce Davis, CEO, chairman, Digimarc; formerly, head of Imagic and Activision; known for his role in development of video game industry
- Henry Clay Folger (1881), president of the Standard Oil Company (1911–23) and founder of the Folger Shakespeare Library
- Ted Forstmann (1965), co-founder of Forstmann Little & Company, chairman and CEO of Gulfstream Aerospace (1990–99), and member of Forbes 400 (1998–2003)
- George Griswold Frelinghuysen (1872), president of P. Ballantine & Sons Company
- Stephen Friedman (1962), chairman of Goldman Sachs (1990–94), director of the National Economic Council (2002–05)
- Charles Patrick Garcia, president of Sterling Hispanic Markets Capital Group; White House Fellow, chairman of the Board of Visitors of the United States Air Force Academy
- Daniel Hunt Gilman (1877), attorney and railroad builder
- Jerome L. Greene (1928), real estate investor and namesake of Columbia's main building, Jerome L. Greene Hall
- Edward S. Harkness (1928)³, Standard Oil Company heir, donated funds used to construct Butler Library at Columbia and most of the undergraduate dormitories at Yale and Harvard, as well as to Phillips Exeter Academy
- Fairfax Harrison (studied law), president, CEO of Southern Railway Company (1913–37)
- Morton L. Janklow (1953), literary agent to Sidney Sheldon, Pope John Paul II, Danielle Steel, Ronald Reagan, and J.K. Rowling
- Mark N. Kaplan (1953), CEO of Drexel Burnham Lambert and Engelhard
- Michael Karlan (1992), founder of the nation's largest social and networking group, Professionals in the City
- Jerome Kohlberg, Jr. (1950), co-founder of Kohlberg Kravis Roberts, member of the Forbes 400
- Orin Kramer (1970), chair of the New Jersey Pension Fund
- Stephen M. Kravit, entertainment attorney and business affairs executive
- Harvey M. Krueger (1953), CEO of Kuhn, Loeb & Co. and vice chairman of Lehman Brothers and Barclays
- James T. Lee (1899), prolific Manhattan real estate developer/magnate; grandfather of Jacqueline Kennedy Onassis
- Richard LeFrak (1970), billionaire real estate investor
- H. F. Lenfest (1958), media proprietor and member of Forbes 400 (from 1999)
- Randy Lerner (1987), chairman and CEO of MBNA (2002–05); owner, Cleveland Browns (2002–) and Aston Villa Football Club (2006–); member of Forbes 400 (since 2002))
- Francis Levien (1928), director of Gulf and Western Industries, namesake of Levien Gymnasium
- Michael Lynne (1964), president (1990–2001), co-CEO and co-chairman (since 2001, incumbent as of 2006) of New Line Cinema
- Douglas H. McCorkindale (1964), CEO (since 2000, incumbent as of 2006) and chairman (since 2001, incumbent as of 2006) of Gannett
- Mark J. Penn, worldwide CEO, public relations firm Burson-Marsteller; president, polling firm Penn, Schoen and Berland Associates
- Tom Pollock, co-founder of The Montecito Picture Company, former chairman of Universal Pictures
- Steven Price, co-founder of Townsquare Media, and minority owner of the Atlanta Hawks
- Freeman Ransom, general manager of Madame C.J. Walker Manufacturing Company and civic leader
- Bruce Ratner (1970), founder (1985), president, and CEO of Forest City Ratner; principal owner of the New Jersey Nets
- Isaac Rice (1880), founded the Electric Boat Company, renamed itself the General Dynamics Corporation in 1952
- Tom Rogers, president and CEO Tivo; former chairman and CEO of Primedia Inc.
- Thomas Rothman (1980), co-chair of Fox Filmed Entertainment
- Lynn Forester de Rothschild, CEO of E L Rothschild (2002–)
- Herb Sandler, founder of Golden West Financial (1963), philanthropist, member of Forbes 400 (from 2003)
- Moose Scheib, founder and CEO of LoanMod.com
- Robert B. Shapiro (1962), CEO of Monsanto Company
- Robert Shaye (1964), founder, chairman/co-chairman and CEO/co-CEO of New Line Cinema (since 1967, incumbent as of 2006)
- Sid Sheinberg, president and COO of MCA
- James Sherwin (B.A. and J.D.), corporate executive and International Master in chess
- Herbert M. Singer (1928), director of PepsiCo
- David Stern (1966), commissioner of the National Basketball Association (since 1984, incumbent as of 2006)
- Todd Stitzer (1978), CEO Cadbury plc (incumbent as of 2009)
- Audrey Strauss (1982), chief legal officer of Alcoa
- Franklin A. Thomas (1963), president of the Ford Foundation (1979–96)
- Russell E. Train (1948), founding trustee, CEO, president, and chairman of the World Wildlife Fund
- S. Robson Walton (1969), chairman of Wal-mart (1992, incumbent as of 2006) and member of the Forbes 400 (since 1992)
- Mark Weldon (1997), CEO of New Zealand Stock Exchange (2002–12)
- Devin Wenig, president and CEO of eBay
- H. Donald Wilson, database pioneer and entrepreneur, first president and one of the principal creators of Lexis and Nexis
- Buchanan Winthrop (1864), philanthropist and descendant of Wait Winthrop and Joseph Dudley
- Justin Woolverton (2009), co-founder and CEO of Halo Top Creamery

== Journalism ==
- Dan Abrams (1992), media legal commentator
- Poultney Bigelow, journalist and author
- Dean Budnick (1990), journalist, filmmaker and author
- Julius Chambers, F.R.G.S., New York journalist, investigative reporter, author, travel writer
- William Dudley Foulke (1871), journalist, literary critic
- Eddie Hayes, journalist, lawyer
- Tudor Jenks (1880), journalist, editor, lawyer
- Robert Krulwich (1974), media journalist, Alfred I. duPont-Columbia University Award, Emmy Award, George Polk Award
- Henry Demarest Lloyd, referred to as the "father of investigative journalism"
- Cynthia McFadden, ABC news anchor, George Foster Peabody Award
- Matthew Miller (1986), also columnist and author, The Two Percent Solution
- Victor Robinson, medical journalist and physician
- Karenna Gore Schiff (2000), journalist, author, lawyer
- Alexander Simpson (attended), journalist, attorney
- Cenk Uygur, creator and co-host of The Young Turks
- H. Walter Webb, journalist

== Private legal practice ==
- Alan J. Altheimer (1925), managing partner of Altheimer & Gray and former president of the Jewish Council on Urban Affairs
- Paul Drennan Cravath (1886), name partner of New York law firm Cravath, Swaine & Moore (awarded first Municipal Law prize, and prize tutorship)
- William Nelson Cromwell (1878), founder of New York law firm Sullivan & Cromwell
- George Davidson (1967), head of the Litigation Department of the New York law firm Hughes Hubbard & Reed
- Gerald Dickler (1933), name partner of Hall, Dickler, Kent, Friedman & Wood and former chairman of Pollock-Krasner Foundation
- Leslie Fagen (1974), litigator; senior partner at the international law firm of Paul, Weiss, Rifkind, Wharton & Garrison
- Marvin E. Frankel (1948), name partner in New York Law firm Kramer Levin Naftalis & Frankel LLP, litigator, federal judge, professor at Columbia Law, legal scholar
- Michael Furst (1878), lawyer
- Bruce Givner (1976), played a minor role on the evening of the Watergate burglary
- William Golub (1937), lawyer and advisor to Governor Nelson Rockefeller
- Sylvan Gotshal, a founder of New York law firm Weil, Gotshal & Manges
- Natasha Hausdorff (born 1989), British barrister, international news commentator, and Israel advocate
- Ed Hayes (1972), defense attorney and Court TV anchor; basis for the character Tommy Killian in the Tom Wolfe novel The Bonfire of the Vanities
- Arthur Garfield Hays (1905), prominent corporate litigator.
- Charles Evans Hughes, a founder of New York law firm Hughes Hubbard & Reed LLP; argued over 50 times before U.S. Supreme Court 1925–1930
- Roberta A. Kaplan (1991), litigator and partner of Paul, Weiss, Rifkind, Wharton & Garrison, argued in United States v. Windsor
- Arundhati Katju (2017), lawyer and advocate at the Supreme Court of India, appeared in many LGBTQ cases in India
- Benjamin Kaye (1907), lawyer, playwright, co-founder of Kaye Scholer
- Caroline Kennedy (1988), daughter of President John F. Kennedy; former candidate for U.S. senator (New York)
- Jeffrey L. Kessler, litigator; partner at the international law firm Winston & Strawn
- Ezra G. Levin (1959), name partner of Kramer Levin Naftalis & Frankel
- Horace Manges, a founder of New York law firm Weil, Gotshal & Manges
- Harvey R. Miller (1959), The New York Times called him "the most prominent bankruptcy lawyer in the nation" in 2007
- Ira Millstein (1949), antitrust expert, partner at Weil, Gotshal & Manges, longest-practicing partner in big law
- Gary P. Naftalis (1967), co-chairman of New York law firm Kramer Levin Naftalis & Frankel LLP
- Louis Nizer, noted trial attorney, senior partner of New York law firm Phillips Nizer LLP
- Karuna Nundy (2001), dual qualified lawyer, senior advocate at the Supreme court of India
- C. Allen Parker (1983), presiding partner of Cravath, Swaine & Moore
- Frank Polk (1897), name partner of Davis Polk & Wardwell
- Charles Rembar (1938), First Amendment rights lawyer
- Simon H. Rifkind, name partner of New York law firm Paul, Weiss, Rifkind, Wharton & Garrison
- Charles F.C. Ruff (1963), Washington attorney who represented Anita Hill and President Bill Clinton
- Jonathan D. Schiller (1973), co-founder of Boies Schiller Flexner LLP
- Whitney North Seymour (1923), president of the ABA; chairman of Simpson Thacher & Bartlett
- Isaac Shapiro (1956), of counsel of Skadden, Arps, Slate, Meagher & Flom, former president of Japan Society
- Sidney B. Silverman, trial lawyer specializing in stockholder actions
- John W. Simpson (1873), a founder of New York law firm Simpson Thacher & Bartlett
- David Sive (1948), pioneer in environmental law; founding partner, Sive, Paget & Riesel, PC
- John Slate (1938), name partner of Skadden Arps Slate Meagher & Flom
- John William Sterling (1867), founder of the New York law firm Shearman & Sterling; major donor to his undergraduate alma mater, Yale University; namesake of Yale's library, law building, and its most prestigious endowed chair
- Francis Lynde Stetson (1869), early leader of New York law firm Davis Polk & Wardwell
- Max Steuer (1893), one of the most effective American trial attorneys in the first half of the 20th century
- Moses J. Stroock (1888), a founder of the law firm Stroock & Stroock
- Sol M. Stroock (1894), a founder of the law firm Stroock & Stroock
- Henry Waters Taft, one of the most notable lawyers in New York, brother of President William Howard Taft
- Thomas Thacher (1873), one of founders of Simpson, Thacher & Bartlett
- Samuel Untermyer (1878), prominent corporate lawyer and civic leader
- Frank Weil, a founder of New York law firm Weil, Gotshal & Manges
- Louis S. Weiss, name partner of New York law firm Paul, Weiss, Rifkind, Wharton & Garrison
- John F. Wharton, name partner of New York law firm Paul, Weiss, Rifkind, Wharton & Garrison

== Religion ==
- J. Reuben Clark (1906), leader in the Church of Jesus Christ of Latter-day Saints (LDS Church); member, Quorum of the Twelve Apostles (1934–61)
- Bernard Hebda (1983), Catholic archbishop of the Archdiocese of Saint Paul and Minneapolis (incumbent as of 2016)
- Charles J. O'Byrne (1984), former Catholic priest

== Activism ==
- Bella Abzug (1947), social rights activist and a leader of the women's rights movement
- Mark Barnes (LL.M. 1991), advocate for public healthcare law at the state and national levels, co-founded the first AIDS law clinic
- Edward Bassett (1886), a founding father of modern-day urban planning
- Lee Bollinger, advocate for affirmative action, defendant in Grutter v. Bollinger and Gratz v. Bollinger
- Robert L. Carter (1941), civil rights activist, NAACP Legal Defense and Educational Fund general counsel, in which capacity he argued Brown v. Board of Education II (1955)
- Julius L. Chambers (LL.M. 1964), civil rights leader, attorney, and educator; third president and director-counsel of the NAACP Legal Defense and Educational Fund
- Felix Cohen (1928), advocate for Native American rights, fundamentally shaped federal Native American law and policy
- Roy Cohn (1947), conservative lawyer who became famous during the investigations of Senator Joseph McCarthy into alleged Communists in the U.S. government
- Robert Cover (1968), civil rights and international anti-violence activist, professor at Yale Law School
- Albert DeSilver (1913), a founding member of the American Civil Liberties Union (ACLU)
- Edward Ennis (1932), chairman of the ACLU from 1969 to 1976
- William Dudley Foulke (1871), reformer, one of the principal reformers, New York State and the federal civil service systems; early president, American Suffrage Association
- Marvin Frankel (1949), founder, Lawyers Committee for Human Rights, served as its chairman for many years; also helped establish sentencing guidelines for the federal courts
- Ruth Bader Ginsburg, women's rights advocate, co-founded the Women's Rights Law Reporter; co-authored the first law school casebook on sex discrimination; as chief litigator of the ACLU's women's rights project, she argued cases before the U.S. Supreme Court
- Richard Gottfried, leading advocate for patient autonomy and for universal access to quality, affordable health care
- Jack Greenberg (B.A. 1945, LL.B. 1948), second president and director-counsel of the NAACP Legal Defense and Educational Fund; argued 40 civil rights cases before the U.S. Supreme Court, including Brown v. Board of Education (1954)
- Arthur Garfield Hays (1905), civil liberties activist, general counsel for the ACLU, notable trials included Scopes Trial, trial of Sacco and Vanzetti, and Scottsboro case
- Charles Evans Hughes, a co-founder of the National Conference of Christians and Jews to oppose the Ku Klux Klan, anti-Catholicism, and anti-Semitism
- Arundhati Katju (LL.M. 2017), has litigated many notable cases at the Supreme Court of India and the Delhi High Court, including the Section 377 case, which overturned Section 377, a colonial-era sodomy law in India which was used to criminalize homosexuality.
- Caroline Kennedy (1988), principal fund raiser of private funds for the New York City public schools, co-founder of Profiles in Courage Award, a director of the Commission on Presidential Debates and the NAACP Legal Defense and Educational Fund, one of three co-chairs of President-elect Barack Obama's Vice Presidential Search Committee (2008), adviser to the Harvard Institute of Politics
- John Marshall Kernochan, advocate for artists' intellectual property rights
- William Kunstler (1948), civil rights and human rights activist, director of the American Civil Liberties Union (ACLU) (1964–72); co-founded the Center for Constitutional Rights
- John Brooks Leavitt (1871), reformer, author
- Peter Lehner, lawyer and environmentalist; executive director, Natural Resources Defense Council
- Charles K. Lexow, first attorney for the Legal Aid Society of New York City; brother of Clarence Lexow (class of 1872)
- Li Lu (1996), leader of the Tiananmen Square Protests (1989), first student at Columbia to simultaneously receive B.A., M.B.A., and J.D. degrees
- Louis Marshall (1876–77), mediator and Jewish community leader who worked to secure religious, political, and cultural freedom for all minority groups; conservationist
- Vilma Socorro Martínez, served for almost ten years as president and general counsel of Mexican American Legal Defense and Educational Fund
- James Meredith (1968), American civil rights movement figure, first African-American student at the University of Mississippi
- Constance Baker Motley (1946), attorney for the NAACP Legal Defense and Educational Fund (1945–64); Manhattan Borough president (1964–66); first African-American woman appointed to the federal bench (1966–86)
- Nancy Northup, president of the Center for Reproductive Rights
- Marshall Perlin (1942), civil liberties lawyer, defended Soviet spies Julius and Ethel Rosenberg
- Anika Rahman (1990), president and CEO, Ms. Foundation for Women (2/2011)
- Paul Rapoport (1965), co-founder of the New York City Lesbian, Gay, Bisexual and Transgender Community Services Center and the Gay Men's Health Crisis
- Michael Ratner (1969), human rights activist on national and international level, current president of the Center for Constitutional Rights (co-founded by William Kunstler in 1969), the National Law Journal named him as one of the 100 most influential lawyers in the US (2006)
- Isaac Rice, U.S. chess patron
- Paul Robeson (1923), civil and human rights activist, international social justice activist, writer, Spingarn Medal
- Menachem Z. Rosensaft (1979), a leader of the Second Generation Movement of children of Jewish survivors
- Brad R. Roth (LL.M. 1992), social and human rights activist, critic of torture policies in the administration of George W. Bush
- Charles Ruthenberg (1909), founder of the Communist Party of America (1919)
- Mikheil Saakashvili (LL.M. 1994), founder and leader of the United National Movement in Georgia (country), leader of the bloodless "Rose Revolution"
- Clive Stafford Smith, British lawyer; received Gandhi International Peace Award (2005) for representing Guantanamo detainees and campaigning against extraordinary rendition
- Cenk Uygur, activist, creator of online progressive network and host of The Young Turks, founder of Wolf-PAC and Justice Democrats
- Judith Vladeck (1947), civil rights advocate, particularly on behalf of women; helped set new legal precedents against sex discrimination and age discrimination
- Charles Weltner (1950), advocate for racial equality, second individual to receive the John F. Kennedy Profile in Courage Award
- Maya Wiley (born 1964), civil rights activist and lawyer, 2021 mayoral candidate for New York City

== Athletics ==
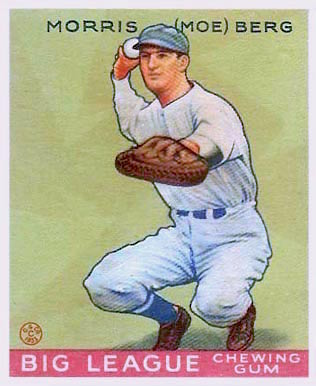
Moe Berg

- Mario Ančić (LL.M. 2013), former Croatian professional tennis player
- Mark Attanasio (1982), investment banker and owner of the Milwaukee Brewers (since 2004, incumbent as of 2006)
- Lou Bender (1935), pioneer player with the Columbia Lions and in early pro basketball, later a successful trial attorney
- Moe Berg (1930), catcher for the Brooklyn Robins (1923), Chicago White Sox (1926–30), Cleveland Indians (1931, 1934), Washington Senators (1932–34) and Boston Red Sox (1935–39); able to speak 12 languages; spy for the OSS; according to Casey Stengel, "the strangest man ever to play Major League Baseball"
- David Mark Berger (1970), winner of NCAA weightlifting title in the 148 pound-class, winner of the gold medal in the middleweight weight-lifting contest at the 1969 Maccabiah Games, winner of a silver medal at the 1971 Asian Games in weightlifting, and member of the 1972 Israeli Olympic team who was murdered during the Munich Massacre at the 1972 Munich Summer Olympics
- Roland W. Betts (1978), investor, film producer, lead owner in George W. Bush's Texas Rangers partnership (1989–98), and developer and owner of Chelsea Piers (since 1989, incumbent as of 2006)
- Nick Bravin (1998), Olympic fencer
- Alan N. Cohen (1954), chairman and CEO of the Madison Square Garden Corporation (1974–77), principal owner of the New Jersey Nets, and principal owner of the Boston Celtics (1983–2004)
- Caryn Davies (Class of 2013), rower; gold medals, 2012 Summer Olympics and 2008 Summer Olympics; silver medal, 2004 Summer Olympics
- Leo Fishel (1900), former pitcher in Major League Baseball
- Stan Kasten (1976), president (2003–) of the MLB Washington Nationals; president (1986–2003) of the MLB Atlanta Braves; president (1986–2003) and general manager (1979–90) of the NBA Atlanta Hawks; president (1999–2003) of the NHL Atlanta Thrashers
- Walter O'Malley (transferred from), owned the Brooklyn/Los Angeles Dodgers team in Major League Baseball 1950–1979
- Paul Robeson (1923), All-American Athlete
- David Stern (1966), NBA commissioner (1984–2014)
- Marc Stern (1969), part-owner of the Milwaukee Brewers
- John Montgomery Ward (1883), played baseball for the Providence Greys (1878–82), New York Giants (1883–89, 1893–94), Brooklyn's Ward Wonders (1890) and Brooklyn Grooms (1890–91); president of the Boston Braves (1911–12); advocate for player's rights; member of the Baseball Hall of Fame (1964)
- Mark Weldon (1997), member of the New Zealand men's swim team at the 1992 Summer Olympics in Barcelona; CEO, New Zealand Stock Exchange; in 2007, rated 25th on New Zealand Listener Power List of the 50 most powerful people in New Zealand

== Notes ==
¹ Studied law at Columbia University prior to the founding of the Law School.

² Failed to complete the law degree.

³ Received the LL.D.
