= Robert Field =

Robert Field may refer to:

- Robert Field (painter) (1769–1819), North American miniaturist
- Robert C. Field (1804–1876), American legislator
- Robert W. Field (born 1944), professor of chemistry
- Robert Isaac Field, public health academic
- Robert Nettleton Field (1899–1987), New Zealand artist, sculptor, potter and art teacher
- Rob Field (born 1994), Scottish field hockey player

== See also ==
- Roberts Field, an airport in Deschutes County, Oregon, United States
- Robert's Field
- Robert Fields (born 1934), American actor
