= Bruce Cutler =

American criminal defense lawyer (1948–2025)

- Born: April 29, 1948; New York City, U.S.
- Died: October 6, 2025 (aged 77); New York City, U.S.
- Education: Brooklyn Law School; Hamilton College
- Occupation: Trial attorney
- Known for: Representing John Gotti and Phil Spector
- Website: brucecutler.com

Bruce Cutler (April 29, 1948 – October 6, 2025) was an American criminal defense lawyer, known for having defended clients including Phil Spector and John Gotti, and for media appearances as a legal commentator.

== Life and career ==
Cutler was born in Brooklyn, New York, on April 29, 1948. His father, Murray Cutler, was a detective in the New York City police who later became a criminal defense attorney. While being interviewed on the radio program Conversations With Allan Wolper on WBGO 88.3 FM, Cutler said that he was inspired by his father's pro-labor, pro-union loyalties to an FDR-style Social Democratic position.

Growing up in a Jewish family in Flatbush, he graduated from Poly Prep Country Day School.

Formerly a Brooklyn Assistant District Attorney, Cutler gained notoriety in the 1980s when he won three acquittals for Gambino Crime Family boss John Gotti (including one where at least one juror accepted a bribe in return for voting to find Gotti not guilty). Gene Mustain and Jerry Capeci wrote in their book Mob Star that Cutler could "take the prosecution's evidence, spin it, scuff it, twist it and pound it to a pulp, until it was nothing more than a lumpy pile of reasonable doubt."

When Gotti was indicted in 1990 for the 1985 murder of Paul Castellano and several other crimes, presiding judge I. Leo Glasser disqualified Cutler and two associates from representing Gotti. Citing evidence from wiretaps at Gotti's Ravenite Social Club, prosecutors contended that Cutler and his colleagues may have known about criminal activity. Since the attorney–client privilege does not apply in these circumstances, prosecutors argued that Cutler was "part of the evidence" and thus liable to be called as a witness. They also argued that Cutler had represented other potential witnesses and thus had a conflict of interest. Glasser sided with the prosecutors, contending that Cutler was the "in-house counsel" for the Gambino family.

Subsequent to his disqualification, Cutler was held in criminal contempt for public statements he made in violation of a court order. Cutler was sentenced to ninety days' house arrest, three years' probation, and an 180-day suspension from practicing law in the Eastern District of New York. On appeal to the Second Circuit, Cutler’s conviction was affirmed.

Cutler appeared in the Robert De Niro and Ed Burns film, 15 Minutes, playing himself. He also appeared on Court TV, with attorney Ed Hayes, discussing criminal cases and current events on Cutler and Hayes, and on the CW network had his own TV show, Jury Duty. He also made two guest star appearances in the episodes "Drawing Dead" and "Open Secrets" of the 4th season of the CBS show Blue Bloods. He was godfather to Hayes' daughter, Avery.

Cutler was the lead defense attorney for Phil Spector until August 27, 2007, when he announced that he was leaving Spector's defense due to "a difference of opinion between Mr. Spector and me on strategy."

Cutler died on October 6, 2025, from kidney failure at a care facility in Brooklyn, at the age of 77.
