= Sidney B. Silverman =

American lawyer

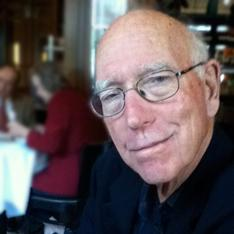
- Born: December 30, 1932; Brooklyn, New York, U.S.
- Died: November 4, 2021 (aged 88)
- Education: A.B. Colgate University; LLM Columbia Law School; Master's, Graduate School of Arts and Science of Columbia University
- Alma mater: Colgate University; Columbia Law School; Columbia University
- Occupations: Lawyer, retired author philanthropist
- Notable work: Books – A Happy Life; What Money Can Buy
- Spouse: Irene Levy Silverman
- Children: Emily Ann Silverman, David Levy Silverman, Julia Rose Levy Silverman
- Website: Sidney B. Silverman

Sidney B. Silverman (December 30, 1932 – November 4, 2021) was an American trial lawyer specializing in stockholder actions. He began in 1957 and retired in 2001. Silverman lectured before legal and business groups. In the fall of 1983, he was appointed an adjunct professor at Yale University. Silverman died on November 4, 2021, after a lengthy illness.

After retiring from law, Silverman enrolled in the Graduate School of Liberal Arts and Sciences at Columbia University. Attending classes only in the fall semester, at age seventy four, he obtained a Masters with a concentration in philosophy. Buoyed by his success in graduate school, he turned to chess, a game he had played for many years. A rank amateur, he sought to become a master, a lofty sounding title but not a high rank in chess circles. Silverman was tutored by Lev Alburt, an International Chessmaster, the highest rank in chess. Despite Alburt’s valiant efforts, Silverman failed. He did obtain a chess rating, a low one far below that of master.

Upon closing chapters in law, philosophy and chess, Silverman opened a new one as an author. He published four books, a memoir: A Happy Life: From Courtroom to Classroom (2009) and three novels, What Money Can Buy (2011), Divorce Lawyer: A Satyr's Tale (2013), and The Prophet and a Jack Mormon (2014).

== Early life and education ==
Silverman was born on December 30, 1932, in Brooklyn, New York. His mother was born in Brooklyn; his father in Rosh Pinah in Palestine, then a Turkish mandate and now part of Israel. Silverman attended an elementary school and a high school in Brooklyn. In 1950, he enrolled in Colgate University and graduated with an A.B. in 1954. He then began the study of law at Columbia Law School graduating in 1957 with an LL.B.

== Legal career ==
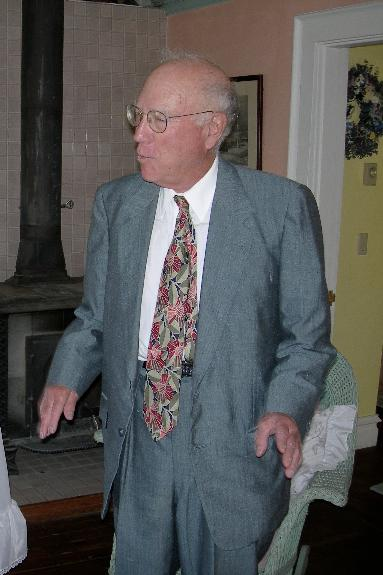

Silverman started his own law practice in 1960 when he was 27 years old. During his career he specialized in corporate litigation, representing clients from the stockholder side of corporate transactions. He was recognized as a leader of the stockholder bar, representing stockholders in leading cases such as Feit v. Leasco, Lynch v. Vickers Energy, Sonet v. Plum Creek, and Herbst v. Itt.

In 1971, Silverman representing the Reliance Insurance Company’s stockholders in a lawsuit against Saul Steinberg and his company Leasco Data. The shareholders contended that their consent to a merger with Leasco was obtained by means of a false and misleading proxy statement. After trial before the honorific Jack B. Weinstein, he ruled in a hundred and twenty five-page decision that the Reliance stockholders had indeed been defrauded. The case has been cited in many subsequent cases and has been noted as one of the most important decision under the National Securities Law.

Silverman represented the public stockholders in Dart Group Corporation. His clients owned class A stock, a non-voting security. The voting stock, class B was owned by members of the Haft family. During the course of the litigation control of the corporation was wrested from the Haft family and placed in a voting trust. Silverman was one of two voting trustees. Through Silverman's efforts, the company was sold for the benefit of all the stockholders.

Silverman also represented individuals in non-stockholder litigations. In Leo v. General Electric, he pursued an action for striped bass fishermen who accused General Electric of polluting the Hudson River with polychlorinated biphenyls discharged from GE factories. The river is the breeding ground of the striped bass. The fish ingested the poisonous chemical. New York State banned, for seven years, harvesting of the fish. Striped bass was the money fish for local fishermen. After many years of litigation, the case was settled. The fishermen received $7 million representing their loss of income from the closure of the fishery. GE also paid Silverman's legal fees and expenses to ensure a full recovery for the fishermen.

Silverman represented Herman Taitt, a black officer employed by Chemical Bank. Taitt accused the bank of promotion discrimination. He was joined by most of his fellow black officers. After a settlement was reached, the bank fired Tait. Silverman then represented Taitt claiming the bank retaliated against Taitt for asserting his civil rights, a right protected by federal law. Taitt's case went to trial. While the case was in the hands of the jury, it was settled. The settlement was placed under seal and cannot be disclosed.

Silverman died on November 4, 2021, at the age of 88.

== Author ==
Silverman is the author of four books, his memoirs, and three novels.

Publication year	Title	Publisher	ISBN
2014	The Prophet and a Jack Mormon	A division of Amazon.com	ISBN 1462030777
2013	Divorce Lawyer: A Satyr's Tale	A division of Amazon.com	ISBN 1481248936
2011	What Money Can Buy	iUniverse	ISBN 1462030777
2009	A Happy Life: From Courtroom To Classroom	iUniverse	ISBN 1440150850

== Philanthropy ==
Silverman has made contributions to Columbia Law School, Columbia University and The Israel Vocal Arts Institute in Tel Aviv, Israel.

He established a scholarship at the law school in the name of his father-in-law, Daniel Levy. The Daniel Levy Scholarship awards grants annually to two law students. The criterion is that an applicant must have attended a special NY high school as did Daniel Levy.

In 2007, Silverman celebrated his fiftieth anniversary as a graduate of the Law School. He marked the occasion by establishing the Irene and Sidney B Silverman Loan Repayment Fund. Recipients of grants, burdened by student debt are relieved of paying interest and repaying the loan if, for a period of five-year, they devote their efforts to serving the public interest. Silverman endowed a chair at Columbia University named the Irene and Sidney B. Siverman Professor of the Humanities. The current holder is Colm Toibin, Irish novelist and leading literary light.

In 2019 Silverman endowed a second Chair to Columbia University, The Irene and Sidney B. Silverman Associate Professor of Medicine, on behalf of Dr. Maryjane Farr.

Silverman established the Bertha and David L Silverman Scholarships at the International Vocal Arts Institute in honor of his parents. The institute trains opera students from all over the world. Scholarships are granted each year to two Israeli students and two non-Israeli students. The program has been in effect since 2002 and will end in 2012.
