= Paula Sharp =

American author

Paula Sharp is an American author whose fictional works focus on the American family and explore themes of social injustice. Her books include The Woman Who Was Not All There (Harper & Row 1988), The Imposter (HarperCollins, 1991), Lost in Jersey City (HarperCollins 1993), Crows over a Wheatfield (Hyperion 1996) and I Loved You All (Hyperion 2000). She is also a translator of Latin American fiction, including Antonio Skármeta's La insurrección (The Insurrection).

== Biography ==
Paula Sharp was born in San Diego, California in 1957. Her parents, nuclear physicist Rodman Sharp and anthropologist Rosemary Sharp, divorced when Sharp was eight. Her mother, a southerner by birth, subsequently relocated the family to Chapel Hill, North Carolina and pursued field work in Mexico and Guatemala. Three years later, the family relocated again to New Orleans. In an interview, Sharp noted that her southern upbringing and early exposure to Latin American culture influenced her literary tastes: "I was raised on Borges and Faulkner, Cortázar and Tennessee Williams, Octavio Paz and Flannery O'Connor, and thus my view of writing was bound to be a little odd: imagine Flem Snopes cheating Borges out of piece of fatback, only to awaken and discover that Borges and the fatback are a dream, but that Flem Snopes is real. That about sums up the way I grew up thinking about literature – it was a territory full of tantalizing ideas and wild characters.”

Sharp's family relocated a third time, in 1972, to Ripon, Wisconsin, where she attended high school. At the age of seventeen, Sharp won first place in The Atlantic Monthly’s national contest for high school students, in the categories of both poetry and essay-writing. Sharp subsequently attended Dartmouth College, where she received the Academy of American Poets Prize for college students and studied modern German and Latin American literature. After completing a thesis on the works of Peruvian poet César Vallejo, Sharp obtained her B.A. in 1979, Phi Beta Kappa and with Highest Honors in Comparative Literature. Sharp has related: “My first love was poetry. But by my mid-twenties, I wanted to write fiction, because I fell in love with plot and grew to treasure complicated plots and complex characters.”

Over the next few years, Sharp worked as a secretary; as a parochial school teacher in an inner city school in Jersey City, New Jersey; as a criminal investigator in the Jersey City public defender’s office; and as a Spanish-English translator for Amnesty International. Sharp also translated Latin American fiction, including Chilean writer Antonio Skármeta’s novel, La insurrección (The Insurrection) and stories by Peruvian author Isaac Goldemburg and Cuban writer Humberto Arenal. Sharp thereafter enrolled in Columbia University Law School, earning her J.D. in 1985. While in law school she clerked for Legal Services and the American Civil Liberties Union and co-edited the Columbia Human Rights Law Review. In law school, Sharp also continued to translate and to write fiction; her first short story, "The Man", was published by the New England Review, and two more stories, "A Meeting on the Highway" and "Hot Springs", were accepted for publication by The Threepenny Review; the latter two subsequently were anthologized in New Stories from the South: The Year's Best, and "The Man" later would become the first chapter of Sharp’s first novel.

After graduating from law school, Sharp joined an anthropological project in Brazil, and she lived for a year in Colider, Mato Grosso, in the Brazilian Amazon. While there, she wrote her first novel, The Woman Who Was Not All There. Upon returning to the United States in 1986, she commenced employment as a public defender for the Legal Aid Society in Manhattan, where she remained until 1993. Her first novel was accepted by Harper & Row three months after she began legal work. In the same year, she was awarded a National Endowment for the Arts Fellowship in fiction. Her first novel was followed by four other novels and a short story collection.

Sharp has taught creative writing at Bryn Mawr and Yale, and was a visiting author at the College of Letters at Wesleyan University in Connecticut from 2003 to 2011.

== Major works of fiction ==
A comic novel about a single parent raising four children in North Carolina in the 1960s, The Woman Who Was Not All There was featured as a Book of the Month Club selection and awarded the Joe Savago New Voice Award by the Quality Paperback Book Club for “the most distinctive and promising work of fiction or non-fiction offered by the book club in 1988”. Carlton Smith of The San Diego Union likened Sharp's writing to that of Flannery O'Connor.

While working as a public defender, Sharp produced two more books. The first was The Imposter, a short story collection published by HarperCollins in 1991. Carolyn See, reviewing for the Los Angeles Times, wrote that “These wonderful stories are about all of us, and they question whether American family life, ever, at any time, had a chance in hell. They remind us that without a little crime we’d all die of boredom; that the best experiences we have are almost always forbidden, and that all of us are just one or two baby steps from losing it altogether.” Sharp's second book once again drew comparisons to the works of Flannery O’Connor. American literary scholar Bruce Gentry wrote in the Flannery O’Connor Literary Bulletin that Sharp's stories echoed “O’Connor’s fascination with our secret desires for trespass and with the mysterious connections between danger and salvation.”

Sharp's short story collection was followed by Lost in Jersey City (1993), a comic novel about a Louisiana widow, Ida Terhune, who flees north to raise a family on her own. Her destination, Walter Satterwait of The New York Times Book Review wrote, is the unlikely metropolis of Jersey City, “its air stinking of fish and sewage, its gamy streets potholed, its landlords wicked, its cops crooked, its politicians and judges warped by greed and corruption. Ms. Sharp exploits these wonderful possibilities, both comic and tragic, with skill, compassion and zest.” The novel was recognized as a New York Times Book Review Notable Book. Lost in Jersey City portrays the American family against an exploration of deeper political issues forming the frayed fabric of American society. Chris Goodrich of the Los Angeles Times compared Sharp's work to that of Louise Malle and Virginia Woolf, stating "...Woolf, I suspect, would have loved it -- and perhaps even been a little envious."

After the publication of her third book, Sharp moved to upstate New York with her family, relinquishing her legal career to write full-time. Her third novel, Crows over a Wheatfield, was published by Hyperion in 1996 and departed markedly from her two previous comic novels. Like Sharp's earlier works, Crows over a Wheatfield focuses on the portrayal of the American family – in this case, a seemingly intact nuclear unit with a father, mother and small child – but the family's semblance of normalcy cloaks dangerous undercurrents, and Crows over a Wheatfield explores the gloomy realm of the treatment of domestic violence victims in American family courts. A national bestseller, Crows over a Wheatfield was an editor's choice of both the Chicago Tribune and the San Francisco Chronicle; a New York Times Book Review Notable Book; and a Book-of-the-Month club featured selection.

In an interview about Crows over a Wheatfield, Sharp explained that she had avoided writing about legal topics for many years: “I found legal work to be a respite from writing, and writing to be an escape from legal work.” Sharp told Philadelphia Inquirer book critic Carlin Romano, “It’s almost fortuitous that this is a book with legal themes. Because when I start to write, I have characters in mind, a story…. Obviously, as a lawyer, I have very definite views about law and how women are treated. But I exorcised those demons in the course of my profession and I never really felt compelled to write about them.” Sharp has noted, however, that her exposure to the dramas of court life greatly affected her writing: “You spend a lot of time as a criminal lawyer puzzling people together, making sense of their motives and figuring out how their lives’ circumstances led them down the wrong roads, or in some cases why nothing led to where they are but their own questionable selves. Watching trials also had a profound effect on how I perceived the nature of narrative authority in writing, and on my assumptions about truth itself. As a defense lawyer in any case, you have to view a crime from many perspectives – the defendant's, the victim's, the prosecutor's, the jurors’. You're forced to understand, repeatedly, that a single act has multiple, contradictory meanings. From the day I watched my first trial, I was never able to write the same way again.”

Sharp's next novel, I Loved You All, was also a New York Times Book Review Notable Book. In this novel, Sharp continued to explore the commingling of the comic and serious, while depicting the American family in the context of a modern political dilemma. Film and literary critic David Templeton wrote: “Crows over a Wheatfield, set in the strange world of the family court system, became a bestseller in 1996, in part owing to its author's knack for taking a serious, potentially morose subject (domestic violence) and cramming it with unexpected pockets of laugh-out-loud humor. Now, with I Loved You All, Sharp pulls off an even trickier stunt, producing a riveting comedy about abortion.” Sources as diverse as The Times of London and Salon.com remarked on Sharp’s penchant for rich characterization and described Sharp’s novel as a refinement of her interest in charting the personal and emotional undercurrents that fuel political ideology. Craig Seligman, writing for The New York Times Book Review, noted that “Sharp has the born novelist's gift of breathing life into her characters. Even the minor characters seem to get up and step off the page. … Sharp's gifts are enormous."

== Photojournalism and Nonfiction Works on Conservation ==
In 2012-2015, Sharp relocated to Brazil to undertake a photojournalism project about the Mato Grosso Amazon. Since 2013, she has lived part-time in the United States and part-time in Brazil, working as a photojournalist, documenting life in the Brazilian Amazon and environmental issues in the United States.

In 2015, Sharp, together with photographer Ross Eatman, co-founded Sharp-Eatman Nature Photography, a photographic society dedicated to documenting conservation issues. Sharp and Eatman's photographs have appeared widely in Science and other scientific periodicals. From 2016 through 2025, an exhibit of Sharp and Eatman's photographic works has been on a national tour in prominent forums, among them the Houston Museum of Natural Science, the Santa Barbara Botanic Garden, Connecticut's Bruce Museum of Art and Science, the International Museum of Art and Science, and the Irving Arts Center Dupree Gallery of the Dallas Metropolitan area. The exhibit appeared most recently, in July 2024, in the Philadelphia area at the Barnes Foundation Arboretum/Maguire Art Museum.

Beginning in 2019, Sharp and Eatman undertook a five-year project documenting native bee species found in the unique habitats of the Texas-Mexico border. Pursuant to her research, Sharp authored a 500-page nonfiction book titled Native Bees of the Lower Rio Grande Valley. Published in January 2025 by Texas A & M University Press, this peer-reviewed work features vivid photographs of 100 species of North American bees, accompanied by short histories summarizing entomological research conducted to date on each species. Many of the bees shown were first documented in the late 1800s and had never appeared previously in published photographs.

Sharp notes: “I wanted to write a book that would reach both academics and ordinary people who love nature. This guide is addressed to anyone interested in native bees – among them, naturalists, gardeners, citizen scientists and conservationists -- as these are the people who, in the end, will strive to preserve natural lands where our native fauna and flora thrive. I also hope that students of entomology will use this book as a springboard for further research into the novel and diverse bee species of the Lower Rio Grande Valley and America’s other borderlands.”
