= Bruce Givner =

American attorney (1950–2025)

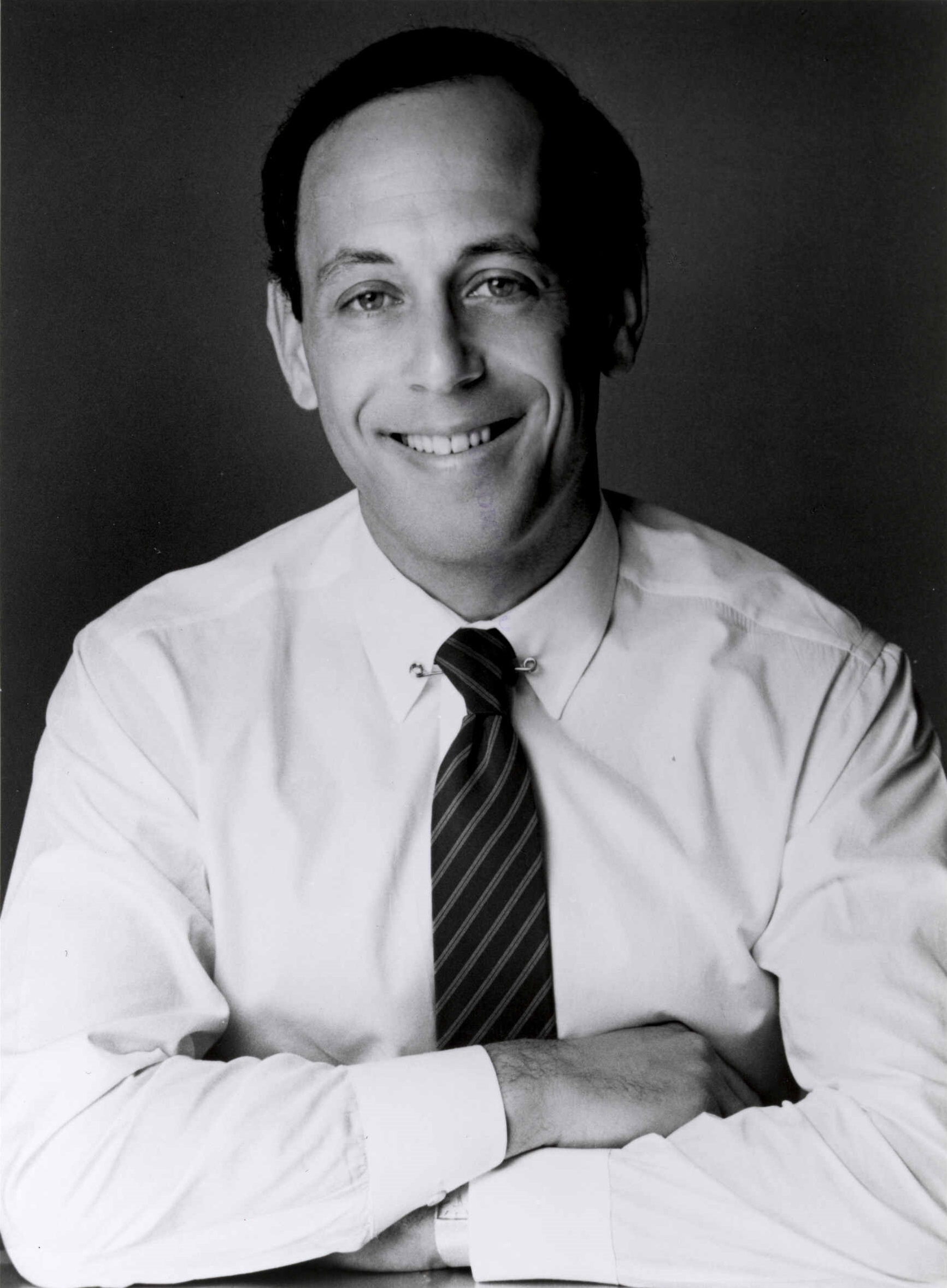
- Born: Bruce Givner; November 16, 1950; Lorain, Ohio, U.S.
- Died: October 23, 2025 (aged 74)
- Education: University of California, Los Angeles, Columbia Law School, New York University
- Occupation: Attorney
- Website: www.kfbrice.com/attorneys/bruce-givner/

Bruce Givner (November 16, 1950 – October 23, 2025) was an American attorney best known for his role on the evening of the Watergate burglary. While working as an intern, Givner remained in the Democratic National Committee's Watergate offices until just after midnight, making free long-distance phone calls to friends and family. His presence substantially delayed the break-in and indirectly led to the eventual arrests of the burglars.

== Early life ==
Givner was born and raised in Lorain, Ohio. Givner's father, Eugene, was diagnosed with multiple sclerosis when Givner was eight years old. Givner's father was forced out of the family business—Givner's Luggage and Jewelry, a general store of sorts in Lorain that sold luggage, jewelry, and the engraving of it, as well as men's clothing. Due to his illness, Eugene Givner was restricted to a wheelchair and was told he would have to move his family to a less humid climate. The family chose to move to Encino, California, after finding a wheelchair-friendly home in that town. Givner's mother, Sonia Ann ("Sunny") worked as a realtor (and sometimes in the Givner store's jewelry department).

== Education ==
Givner attended the following schools:

- Washington Elementary School (1956 to 1963)
- Hawthorne Junior High (1963 to 1964)
- Lorain Admiral King High School, Lorain, Ohio (1965 to 1969)
- University of California, Los Angeles, CA (1973); B.A. – Major: History
- Columbia Law School, New York, New York, (1976); J.D.
- New York University School of Law, New York, New York, (1977); LL.M. (Tax)

The day after Givner graduated from Admiral King High School in Ohio, he flew to Los Angeles and moved into Sproul Hall at UCLA. By the end of 1971, his sophomore year, he became involved in student government. The faculty assigned him to a group that included Rick Tuttle, an original freedom rider with Martin Luther King Jr. who would later become treasurer of the city of Los Angeles. Sheila Kuehl, a future L.A. County Commissioner, was also a part of that group. At the end of his junior year at UCLA, Givner entered the Summer Internship Program which placed students in various government offices in Los Angeles, Sacramento, and Washington, D.C. Givner landed an internship at the Democratic National Committee, not the most coveted position; those who were lucky were given ones with members of Congress.

== Watergate ==
Givner played a role in the FBI's investigation of the Watergate scandal. He was featured in Joseph Rodota's book The Watergate: Inside America's Most Infamous Address. Givner is also cited in many articles such as Harper's January 1980 feature story: "The McCord File" by Jim Hougan. He also was the only subject in Columbia Law School News' "If Not for Him, Nixon Might Still Be President" by Jim Shaw, referring to Givner as the person "if not for…". He also has been written about in a book by Roger Stone and Mike Colapietro titled Nixon's Secrets: The Rise, Fall, and Untold Truth about the President, Watergate, and the Pardon, and White House Call Girl: The Real Story written by Phil Stanford.

Givner was a 21-year-old intern working at the DNC offices on the sixth floor of the Watergate office complex when his prolonged stay on that floor the night of June 16, 1972, precluded the group of "bandits" from entering the building to correct their earlier wiretap work. The criminals were set up across the street in a suite above the Howard Johnson's, while they waited for the lights to go out in the offices on the sixth floor at the DNC offices. Though Givner finished his intern duties around 7:30 p.m., he stayed to use a WATS line to make "about 20" free long-distance calls to friends and family, both in Los Angeles and Ohio. Sometime during the middle of those calls, Givner needed to use the restroom. Realizing he could not re-enter the suites when using the bathroom in the hallway because he had no key to re-enter, Givner stepped out onto the balcony and relieved himself in a cement planter. (The Watergate burglars likely witnessed that event through binoculars as they lay in wait for the right time to make their move, which they finally did less than an hour after Givner left the building shortly after midnight.) That was long after the burglars had hoped to get in.

After his phone calls that evening, Givner finally turned off the lights on Saturday, June 17, 1972, at 12:05 a.m., he told numerous reporters over the years. He then bolted down the stairwell, where he began chatting in the lobby with Frank Wills, the security guard on duty at midnight at the Watergate. After some friendly small talk, Wills and Givner headed across the street to the Howard Johnson's restaurant for cheeseburgers, fries, and milkshakes. Wills began to follow up with his supervisor's supervisor (he couldn't reach his own)—the person to whom he reported the tape on the level two basement door before he left for the Howard Johnson's. The tape was still there which prevented the door from locking. Shortly after reconnecting with his supervisor's supervisor, Wills called police, who arrived within minutes. The burglars had sneaked in, and arrests were quickly made.

When Givner returned to his office at the DNC the following day – Saturday afternoon, around 3 p.m. – the sixth floor was swarming with police, FBI and other authorities. Givner let them know he had not left the building until shortly after midnight. That critical piece of information was pivotal to the investigation.

On November 10, 1974, The New York Times Sunday Magazine published an article by Sol Stern about the Watergate burglary, "A Watergate Footnote," wherein Stern refers to Givner as "the mystery man" in the Watergate event. Givner wrote to the Times explaining who he was and downplaying any participation in the critical and historical event. |quote=I have now been contacted by the so‐called mystery man and he turns out to be not very mysterious. He is Bruce Givner, 24, a second‐year law student at Columbia University.}}</ref> The Times published his letter. Givner also was interviewed by Bob Fink, a researcher for The Washington Post, who had been hired by Woodward and Bernstein to work on their book, All the President's Men. Fink confronted Givner, at first, strongly suggesting that Givner may have been a part of the botched event, a plant, but shortly after that conversation, Fink was convinced Givner had not played a role in the crime.

Wills was lauded as the hero who alerted police of the break-in, though later, Givner was credited as having provided critical information. Givner was not only questioned by the D.C. police and the FBI, but in October 1973 he also was interviewed by Senator Fred Thompson, who was the minority counsel to the Senate Select Committee on Presidential Campaign Activities. Givner was credited with having stopped the McCord group from getting into the building to do their dirty work "on time".

In 2019, Givner released a book titled My Watergate Scandal Tell-All: How I Unwittingly Caused This Historic Event recalling and detailing his experiences and life before and during the Watergate events. He held a press conference at the former DNC headquarters (now SAGE publishing) along with Watergate arresting officers, Paul Leeper and John Barrett. The three took media on a tour of the 6th floor of the Watergate describing each moment of Givner's late stay there and the officers' blow-by-blow description of the arrest.

== Career ==
Givner was admitted to the State Bar of California in December 1976 and began practicing law in Encino. Givner later practiced tax law in Los Angeles at the law offices of KFB Rice LLP.

== Death ==
Givner was diagnosed with leukemia in 2022 and died of complications related to his illness on October 23, 2025.
