= Paul Tappan =

- Born: Paul Wilbur Tappan; 1911; Danbury, Connecticut, US
- Died: July 9, 1964 (aged 52–53); Berkeley, California, US
- Education: Clark University; University of Wisconsin–Madison; New York University; Columbia University
- Scientific career
- Fields: Criminology
- Institutions: University of California, Berkeley

Paul Wilbur Tappan (1911 – July 9, 1964) was an American criminologist who served as Professor of Law and Criminology at the UC Berkeley School of Law from 1962 until his death in 1964. He earned a Ph.D. in sociology from the University of Wisconsin–Madison in 1935 and subsequently began his academic career at Miami University of Ohio. His interest in criminal behavior and treatment led him to earn an LL.B. (New York University School of Law, 1943) and J.S.D. (Columbia Law School, 1945). He was chairman of the United States Board of Parole from 1953 to 1954. Prior to joining the faculty of the University of California, he taught at Queens College and at New York University. He was the author of numerous books and scholarly articles, and was active in professional societies, conferences, and advisory committee work, including United Nations Section on Social Defense, the American Correctional Association, the American Bar Association, and the Third International Congress of Criminology for which he was named United States National Reporter.
