= Robert Cover =

Legal theorist and professor

Robert M. Cover
- Born: July 30, 1943; Boston, Massachusetts, U.S.
- Died: July 18, 1986 (aged 42); Middletown, Connecticut, U.S.
- Scientific career
- Fields: Jurisprudence
- Institutions: Yale Law School

Robert M. Cover (July 30, 1943 – July 18, 1986) was an American law professor, scholar, and activist. He taught at Yale Law School from 1972 until his death at age 42 in 1986. Cover wrote on a number of subjects, including the relationship of violence to the law; the centrality of narrative to juridical structures, jurisgenerativity, and court decisions regarding slavery. Cover's interests were wide-ranging and included philosophy of law, baseball, Hebrew texts, and political affairs.

== Biography ==
Robert M. Cover was born on July 30, 1943, in Boston, Massachusetts. Cover attended Princeton University and Columbia Law School, from which he graduated in 1968, subsequently becoming a law professor there until 1971, when he moved to Yale Law School. In 1981, he received a Guggenheim Fellowship for his research on the Supreme Court and American ideology. Cover died on July 18, 1986, at Middlesex Memorial Hospital in Middletown, Connecticut, from a heart attack. Surviving family members included his wife Diane; his son Avidan, a professor at Case Western Reserve University School of Law; his daughter Leah; and his brother Arnold.

He lent his strong support to the campaign to divest Yale of apartheid South African financial holdings. He was also interested in Jewish social and legal history, and at the time of his death he was translating a Renaissance Hebrew text on the law of jurisdiction.

== Work ==
=== Nomos and Narrative ===
In "Nomos and Narrative", he tells that "we inhabit a 'nomos' — a normative universe. We constantly create and maintain a world of right and wrong, of lawful and unlawful, of valid and void". He explains that the normative universe is held together by the force of interpretive commitments — some small and private, others immense and public. These commitments — of officials and of others — determine what law means and what law shall be. If there existed two legal orders with identical legal precepts and identical, predictable patterns of public force, they would nonetheless differ essentially in meaning if, in one of the orders, the precepts were universally venerated while in the other they were regarded by many as fundamentally unjust.

From this it follows, that ...

the rules and principles of justice, the formal institutions of the law, and the conventions of a social order are, indeed, important to that world; they are, however, but a small part of the normative universe that ought to claim our attention. No set of legal institutions or prescriptions exists apart from the narratives that locate it and give it meaning. For every constitution there is an epic, for each decalogue a scripture. Once understood in the context of the narratives that give it meaning, law becomes not merely a system of rules to be observed, but a world in which we live.

=== Violence and the Word ===
In his most famous article, "Violence and the Word", he writes that

"Legal interpretation takes place in a field of pain and death. This is true in several senses. Legal interpretive acts signal and occasion the imposition of violence upon others: A judge articulates her understanding of a text, and as a result, somebody loses his freedom, his property, his children, even his life. Interpretations in law also constitute justifications for violence which has already occurred or which is about to occur. When interpreters have finished their work, they frequently leave behind victims whose lives have been torn apart by these organized, social practices of violence. Neither legal interpretation nor the violence it occasions may be properly understood apart from one another";

He concludes:

"The perpetrator and victim of organized violence will undergo achingly disparate significant experiences. For the perpetrator, the pain and fear are remote, unreal, and largely unshared. They are, therefore, almost never made a part of the interpretive artifact, such as the judicial opinion. On the other hand, for those who impose the violence the justification is important, real and carefully cultivated. Conversely, for the victim, the justification for the violence recedes in reality and significance in proportion to the overwhelming reality of the pain and fear that is suffered. Between the idea and the reality of common meaning falls the shadow of the violence of law, itself".

=== Justice Accused: Antislavery and the Judicial Process ===
Examines how judges in the antebellum era who personally opposed slavery nevertheless decided cases in favor of slave masters. An example was Herman Melville's father-in-law, Lemuel Shaw.

=== On Baseball ===
He also published the brief "Your Law-Baseball Quiz" on the editorial page of The New York Times on April 5, 1979, comparing Supreme Court justices to baseball players. It proved influential among law students, leading to the adoption of many baseball-related metaphorical devices.

== Bibliography ==
=== Books ===
- Justice Accused: Antislavery and the Judicial Process (1975)
- The Structure of Procedure (1979)
- Narrative, Violence, and the Law: The Essays of Robert Cover (1995)

=== Articles (selected) ===
- "Forward: Nomos and Narrative". Harvard Law Review. 97 (1): 4. November 1983.
  - A Hebrew translation was published by Shalem Press in 2012.
- "Violence and the Word". Yale Law Journal. 95 (8): 1601. July 1986.
- Cover, Robert M. (1987). "Obligation: A Jewish Jurisprudence of the Social Order". Journal of Law and Religion. 5 (1): 65–74. doi:10.2307/1051017. JSTOR 1051017.
- Cover, Robert M. (1988). "Bringing the Messiah Through the Law: A Case Study". Nomos. 30: 201–217. JSTOR https://www.jstor.org/stable/24219327
  - A Hebrew translation was published by Shalem Press in 2012.
