= Duffield Osborne =

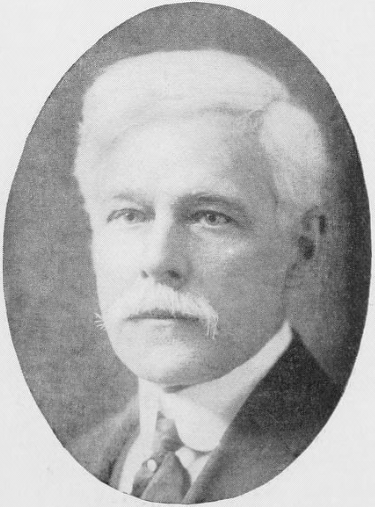
- Born: Samuel Duffield Osborne; June 20, 1858; Brooklyn, New York, US
- Died: November 20, 1917 (aged 59); Brooklyn, New York, US
- Education: Polytechnic University of New York; Columbia College; Columbia Law School
- Occupation: Writer

Samuel Duffield Osborne (1858–1917) was an American writer.

== Biography ==
Duffield Osborne was born on June 20, 1858, in Brooklyn, New York. He was a son of Samuel Smith and Rosalie Willoughby (Duffield) Osborne; grandson of Samuel and Abbie M. (Theall) Osborne, and of James Murdoch and Margaretha A. (Prince) Duffield, and a descendant of George Duffield, who emigrated from Ireland to Pequea Township, Pennsylvania, in 1720, and of Carel de Beauvais, who emigrated from France and settled in New York in 1659.

Osborne attended the Polytechnic University of New York and was a graduate from Columbia College, A.G., 1879, A.M., 1882, and from the Columbia Law School, LL.B., 1881. He was admitted to the bar in 1881 and practised in New York City, 1881–92. He was assistant secretary of the Brooklyn department of city works, 1892–94; traveled in Europe, 1895–96, and on his return settled in New York City and engaged in literary work. He was elected a member of the Linnaean Society in 1878; a corresponding member of the Nuttall Ornithological Club in 1879, and an associate member of the American Ornithologists' Union in 1883.

He edited: Livy's Roman History in the World's Great Books series (1898); Macaulay's Lays of Ancient Rome (1901), and became associate editor of the Home Library of Literature and Achievement, in 1901. He is the author of: The Spell of Ashtaroth (1888); The Robe of Nessus (1890); The Secret of the Crater (1900); The Lion's Brood (1901), and of many short stories, essays and poems.

Osborne died from pneumonia in Brooklyn on November 20, 1917.
