= Hall Dickler Kent Goldstein & Wood =

Hall Dickler Kent Goldstein & Wood was a New York–based law firm founded in 1974 upon the merger of two firms that traced their roots back to the 1940s. In 2003 it was absorbed into Reed Smith LLP.

== History ==
The law firm of Hall Casey & Dickler opened for business in 1945. Leonard W. Hall served several times as Republican Party chairman, and ran parts of President Dwight D. Eisenhower's election campaigns. William Casey went on to head the Securities and Exchange Commission (SEC), the Export-Import Bank and the Central Intelligence Agency (CIA).

Gerald Dickler specialized in the arts and broadcasting, representing a diverse group of clients including Lowell Thomas, Mike Todd, Georgia O'Keeffe, Isaac Asimov, Buckminster Fuller, Norman Vincent Peale and Bruce Catton. Dickler was also chairman of the Pollock-Krasner Foundation; and a founder of Capital Cities Communications, in which Casey was also an investor and partner.

== Acquisition ==
The law firm with which it merged, Lawler Sterling & Kent, was entertainment-law focused.

Private investment company Oak Point Partners acquired the remnant assets, consisting of any known and unknown assets that weren't previously administered, from the Hall Dickler, LLP Bankruptcy Estate on December 23, 2011.

== See also ==
- Parker Chapin Flattau & Klimpl
