= Gerald Dickler =

American lawyer

- Born: August 20, 1912; New York City, United States
- Died: February 13, 1999 (aged 86); New York City, United States
- Education: Columbia University (BA, LLB)
- Occupation: lawyer
- Known for: co-founder of Capital Cities Communications; chairman of the Pollock-Krasner Foundation; founder of Hall Dickler Kent Goldstein & Wood

Gerald Dickler (August 20, 1912 – February 13, 1999) was an American lawyer who represented artists such as Georgia O'Keeffe, John Henry Faulk and Lee Krasner and was the former chairman of the Pollock-Krasner Foundation, which he helped establish. He was also a founding member of Capital Cities/ABC Inc. and founding partner of the law firm Hall, Dickler, Kent, Friedman & Wood.

== Biography ==
Dickler was born in Manhattan to immigrants from Russia and Romania and graduated from George Washington High School in 1928. He graduated from Columbia College in 1931 and obtained his law degree from Columbia Law School in 1933. After graduating from law school, he worked for the law firm of Samuel Rosenman, an advisor to Franklin D. Roosevelt, for two years before starting own practice.

Dickler was asked by news broadcaster and commentator H. V. Kaltenborn to help with organizing the first radio workers' union, a forerunner of the American Federation of Television and Radio Artists. He was then recommended by Kaltenborn to work for other artists, including Lowell Thomas and movie director Mike Todd in promoting the wide-screen movie format Cinerama.

In the 1950s, he co-founded Capital Cities Communications and served as its corporate secretary. The company took over ABC and became Capital Cities/ABC Inc., of which he was a board member. In 1959, he joined what is now the firm of Hall, Dickler, Kent, Friedman & Wood, from which he retired in 1989.

Dickler also helped co-found the Pollock-Krasner Foundation, under the will of Lee Krasner, widow of Jackson Pollock, and served as the foundation's chairman from 1985 until his death.

== Personal life ==
Dicker died on February 13, 1999, at Mount Sinai Medical Center at 86. He was married to Ruth Crohn Dickler, who he married while studying at Columbia's law school. His wife was active in the Citizens Housing and Planning Council of New York City and served as a board member there.

He and his wife established the Gerald and Ruth Dickler Foundation in 1996 to address education reform and issues such as literacy and equitable access to education in New York's public schools.
