= Peter Lehner =

Peter Lehner (born 1958) is an American lawyer and environmentalist. He leads the sustainable food and farming program at Earthjustice, developing strategies to reduce harmful effects of food production on climate, human health and the environment, and to promote a more ecologically sound agricultural system. In 2022, he wrote Farming for Our Future, about the policies and legal reforms needed for climate-neutral agriculture in the U.S., with Nathan Rosenberg He is a frequent blogger and has written numerous legal articles and been on many podcasts.

== Education ==
Lehner received Bachelor of Arts degrees in philosophy and mathematics from Harvard College and is an honors graduate of Columbia Law School.

== Career ==
From 1985 to 1994, Lehner worked for the New York City Law Department and eventually created and led the environmental prosecution unit. His cases protecting the city's drinking water laid the foundation for the city's current watershed protection program. Subsequently, he joined NRDC as director of the water program from 1994 to 1999, where he brought attention to the problem of stormwater pollution.

From 1999 to 2006, Lehner served as chief of the Environmental Protection Bureau of the New York State Attorney General's office. He supervised all environmental litigation by and against the state and developed multi-state strategies targeting global warming and air pollution from the nation's electric utilities. Law established in Supreme Court decisions in two of these cases, Massachusetts v. EPA and American Electric Power v. Connecticut, remains critical to climate change mitigation efforts. Lehner also initiated watershed-wide enforcement programs and led cases addressing invasive species, wildlife protection, and public health.

Lehner was the executive director of the Natural Resources Defense Council and the NRDC Action Fund from 2007 to 2015. During his tenure, he managed environmental advocates in seven NRDC offices and led the Action Fund's political activities. He opened new offices for NRDC in Beijing and Chicago and launched a Center for Market Innovation. In 2010, he co-authored the book In Deep Water, about the 2010 Deepwater Horizon oil spill, with Bob Deans. Among other new initiatives, Lehner shaped a clean food program addressing food waste, antibiotics in meat, regional food, and climate mitigation. He delivered a TEDx talk on food waste in 2013.

== Awards and honors ==
Lehner has been honored with the Distinguished Public Service Award by the Association of the Bar of the City of New York; the Earth Day Good Government Award by the City of New York; the Environmental Leadership Award by Hudson Riverkeeper; the Region II Environmental Quality Award by the U.S. Environmental Protection Agency; the Environmental Leadership award by Environmental Advocates; and the Public Interest Achievement Award from the Public Interest Law Foundation. In 2015, Lehner was presented with the Right Stuff Award from the Apollo Alliance Project of the Blue Green Alliance, for outstanding efforts to promote a sustainable environment and economy.

== Personal life ==
Lehner is married to Fritz Beshar and has three daughters: Nadine, Eliza and Marina.

== See also ==
- Earthjustice
- NRDC
