= Norman H. Wolfe =

American judge

Norman H. Wolfe (born 1928) is a former Special Trial Judge of the United States Tax Court.

Born in New York, Wolfe attended public school in Maplewood, New Jersey and graduated from Columbia High School in 1946. He received an A.B. from Yale University in 1950 and an LL.B. from Columbia Law School in 1953, where he was a Stone Scholar, a James Kent Scholar, and in Phi Beta Kappa.

Wolfe was admitted to the New York Bar in 1953. He was in military service from 1953 to 1957, becoming a 1st Lieutenant in the Judge Advocate General Corps in 1954 and holding that position for the duration of his service. He was in private practice with the law firm of Gordon, Brady, Caffrey & Keller in New York City from 1957 to 1959. He worked for the United States Department of Justice from 1959 to 1965 as a trial attorney in the appellate section of the Tax Division.

Admitted to the Massachusetts Bar in 1965, Wolfe returned to private practice in Boston, Massachusetts, with the firm of Foley, Hoag & Eloit LLP (now Foley Hoag LLP), primarily in the tax area. He became a partner in 1967, and continued with the firm until 1985. He was appointed as Special Trial Judge, United States Tax Court, on July 1, 1985.

Among the cases decided by Wolfe was Crawford v. Commissioner, holding that Special Trial Judges of the United States Tax Court could decide constitutional questions relating to tax deficiencies. This decision was upheld by the United States Court of Appeals for the Ninth Circuit.
