= Rocky Pollack =

Robert (Rocky) L. Pollack was appointed to the Provincial Court of Manitoba on December 15, 2006.

Judge Pollack began his legal career with the Manitoba Attorney General's department in 1972 and later worked as a Crown attorney until moving into private practice in 1976. Prior to his appointment to the bench, he was a partner in the Winnipeg law firm of Myers Weinberg LLP. He held the appointed position of Commissioner of the Manitoba Securities Commission from 2002 until 2006. Pollack's practice was focused on criminal law, but extended to other areas, including child protection, victims' rights, administrative law and civil litigation. He has also been an active member of the community serving on many boards and agencies over the years.
