= Eddie Hayes (lawyer) =

American lawyer

Edward W. Hayes
- Born: November 3, 1947 (age 79); New York City, US
- Education: University of Virginia (BA); Columbia Law School (JD)
- Occupations: Lawyer, author
- Spouse: Susie Gilder (m. 1986)
- Children: two

Edward Walter Hayes (born November 3, 1947) is an American lawyer, journalist, and memoirist. He is known for his role in settling the estate of Andy Warhol and representing several organized crime figures. Tom Wolfe's character Tommy Killian in The Bonfire of the Vanities is based on Hayes. Hayes is often regularly featured on different radio stations, in both Ireland and the USA. Most recently, Hayes was portrayed as a character in the Broadway hit, Lucky Guy, starring Tom Hanks.

== Early life ==
Hayes was born in New York City in the neighborhood of Sunnyside, Queens, and grew up for a period of time in Jackson Heights, Queens before his family finally settled in Smithtown, New York. In his memoir, Mouthpiece, Hayes recalls the regular beatings he received from his alcoholic father as well as other children in the neighborhood. He also recalls watching his father beat his mother and attempting to intervene. Hayes has two younger siblings, one sister and one brother. He and his brother both attended the University of Virginia where they were members of the fraternity Sigma Phi Epsilon. Both Hayes and his brother received B.A. degrees and went on to receive J.D. degrees from Columbia Law School together. Hayes supported himself through college first as a bartender, and later as a law clerk. At Columbia, Hayes met former New York governor George Pataki, with whom he formed a close friendship.

== Legal practice ==
Hayes became a licensed attorney in New York in 1973 and worked as an Assistant District Attorney in the homicide unit in the Bronx before opening a private practice.

In the matter of the Warhol estate, Hayes was hired by the artist's foundation for a fee proportional to the value of the estate. His appraisers valued the estate at nearly $700 million, in contrast to the $100 million figure that Christie's auction house had given the foundation. The Court found the estate was worth $500 million. The Foundation is required to give away 5% of the value of its assets, so this decision was important to the public, as well as to Hayes. After several rounds of litigation between Hayes and the Foundation, an Appellate Court ruled he had been overpaid, violated his fiduciary duties to the Estate and owed them over a million dollars. On August 23, 1996, Hayes filed for bankruptcy according to the Second Circuit's opinion in the case. Hayes filed a complaint against the Appellate Judge who ruled against him, Justice Francis Murphy, on the grounds that Murphy had a relationship with the lawyer for the Foundation that he should have disclosed. Murphy resigned rather than answering the complaint.

In the 2000s, Hayes collaborated with Bruce Cutler, best known as John Gotti's former attorney, in defending a pair of New York police officers accused of organized crime related murders. At this time, Hayes also represented Daniel Libeskind, the master plan architect for the reconstruction of the World Trade Center site in Lower Manhattan.

== Pop culture ==
Tom Wolfe met Hayes socially and they became close friends. In addition to dedicating his 1987 novel The Bonfire of the Vanities to Hayes, Wolfe has acknowledged that he based the lawyer character Tommy Killian on him.

Andy Warhol had met the lawyer briefly in the fall of 1980 and wrote in his diary:

Defense lawyer named Ed Hayes who looked like he was from Laverne and Shirley, like a plant that people invite to parties to wear funny clothes and jump around and make things ‘kooky.’ Sort of forties clothes, really crew cut, about twenty-nine. He said, ‘I can get ya outta anything.’

In the 1990 American film classic Goodfellas, Hayes played Robert De Niro's attorney. Hayes also represented De Niro off screen.

Hayes's phrase, "I can get ya outta anything," is widely used among the many news reporters and journalists that Hayes represents. Hayes's representation of famed tabloid columnist Mike McAlary was depicted in the 2013 Broadway hit, Lucky Guy, starring Tom Hanks.

He has been named to Vanity Fair's International Best-Dressed List Hall of Fame. Hayes has also been featured in the 2013 book, I am Dandy by Rose Callahan and Nathaniel Adams.

== Other work ==
In 2006, when Hayes published his memoir Mouthpiece: A Life in—and Sometimes Just Outside—the Law (written jointly with Susan Lehman), describing his life and law career, Wolfe wrote its introduction.

Hayes was a weekly contributor to The Sunday Supplement Show on Irish radio station Today FM until 2010.

As of 2014, Hayes is a weekly correspondent on the John Batchelor Show, where he covers topics such as crime, NYC politics, and more.

== Personal life ==
Hayes married Susie Gilder, model and actress, on May 31, 1986. Their wedding was covered in Vanity Fair.

Hayes has struggled with psychological trauma from his abusive childhood and chronic depression for most of his life, and in his memoir, covers his efforts to treat it with therapy and eventually medication. He also abstains from drinking alcohol because of his father's alcoholism. Hayes has been motivated by his childhood trauma to help people, such as representing twenty 9/11 police widows who were having problems collecting relief money.

He has two children, a daughter named Avery and a son named John. Hayes's friend and sometimes partner, Bruce Cutler, is Avery's godfather. Avery was also featured in a Daily News article about daughters sartorially influenced by their fathers.
