= Harvey Goldschmid =

American lawyer

- Born: Harvey Jerome Goldschmid; May 6, 1940; New York City, New York, U.S.
- Died: February 12, 2015 (aged 74); New York City, New York, U.S.
- Education: Columbia University (BA, JD)
- Scientific career
- Fields: Corporation law, securities law
- Workplaces: Columbia Law School

Harvey Jerome Goldschmid (May 6, 1940 – February 12, 2015) was the Dwight Professor of Law at Columbia Law School. From 2002 to 2005, he served as a member of the Securities & Exchange Commission, where, though a Democrat, often sided with chairman William H. Donaldson. He was also an advisory board member of the Millstein Center for Corporate Governance and Performance at the Yale School of Management.

== Biography ==
Goldschmid was born in The Bronx on May 6, 1940. He graduated from Columbia College and Columbia Law School. He joined the Columbia Law School faculty in 1970 and became the Dwight Professor of Law in 1984.

== Role in securities regulation ==
Goldschmid was recognized as perhaps the most influential SEC Commissioner who did not become the Chairman of the regulatory commission in the agency's history.

Goldschmid was an advisor and general counsel to SEC Chairman Arthur Levitt. Goldschmid supervised the revision of the pivotal SEC Rule of Practice 102(e) and helped draft Regulation FD. SEC Rule of Practice 102(e)(iv), four paragraphs long, articles "improper professional conduct".

During the chairmanships of Harvey Pitt and Bill Donaldson, Goldschmid continued his service as a Commissioner.

Goldschmid publicly opposed the confirmation of Bill Webster as the first chair of the Public Company Accounting Oversight Board due to issues with the appointment process. Webster was confirmed by a three-to-two vote over Goldschimd's dissent. Later, both Webster and Chairman Pitt resigned.

During the subsequent chairmanship of Bill Donaldson, the Commission budget was expanded. One issue where Goldschmid differed with Donaldson was over shareholder proxy access.

Goldschmid was one of the reporters on the American Law Institute's (ALI) Principles of Corporate Governance project. Part IV of this document addressed the business judgment rule and duty of care.

== Personal life ==
Goldschmid died of complications from pneumonia in Manhattan on February 12, 2015, aged 74.

Preceded by Richard H. Walker	SEC General Counsel; 1998–1999	Succeeded by David M. Becker
