= Robert Isaac Field =

Robert I. Field is a professor at Drexel University Kline School of Law.

Field received his undergraduate degree from Harvard College, Juris Doctor degree from Columbia Law School, master's in public health from the Harvard School of Public Health, and doctorate in psychology from Boston University.

He has worked in private law firms, an academic medical center, and policy research centers, including the Institute of Medicine.
