= Jailhouse lawyer =

Criminal who gives legal advice to other criminals while incarcerated

Jailhouse lawyer is a colloquial term in North American English to refer to an inmate in a jail or other prison who, though usually never having practiced law nor having any formal legal training, informally assists other inmates in legal matters relating to their sentence (e.g. appeal of their sentence, pardons, stays of execution, etc.) or to their conditions in prison. Sometimes, they also assist other inmates in civil matters of a legal nature. The ability that inmates have to help other illiterate inmates file petition for post conviction relief was first recognized in Johnson v. Avery. This same case also determined that unless states provide reasonable alternative, they must permit such action by jailhouse lawyers.

The term can also refer to a prison inmate who is representing themselves in legal matters relating to their sentence. The important role that jailhouse lawyers play in the criminal justice system has been recognized by the U.S. Supreme Court, which has held that jailhouse lawyers must be permitted to assist illiterate inmates in filing petitions for post-conviction relief unless the state provides some reasonable alternative.

Many states in the U.S. have jailhouse lawyer statutes, some of which exempt inmates acting as jailhouse lawyers from the licensing requirements imposed on other attorneys when they are helping indigent inmates with legal matters. However, this is a service that can be taken away or restricted and states may lay down restrictions on jailhouse lawyers especially if they find that inmates are not only being abused by jailhouse lawyers but committing abuse themselves. Such restrictions that can be placed include limitations on the times when and places where such business can be conducted, but none of these restrictions can simply be placed without reason or simply arbitrarily. The most common reason that restrictions are added is that prisoners have started to provide more formal legal advice. Unless one has taken a bar exam in the state in which one resides and has passed said exam, one is not allowed to provide legal counsel. They also found in Shaw v. Murphy that inmates do not hold a First Amendment right to provide formal legal counsel to other inmates.

Cases brought by inmates have also called attention to the need for jailhouse lawyers to have access to law libraries.

Since 1978 the Columbia Human Rights Law Review of Columbia Law School has published A Jailhouse Lawyer's Manual ("the JLM"), intended to help prisoners and jailhouse lawyers appeal their sentence, protest their conditions of imprisonment, etc. The eleventh edition was published in 2017. It is available for free online. In 2003 the Center for Constitutional Rights and National Lawyers Guild published The Jailhouse Lawyers Handbook for inmates needing rudimentary information on jailhouse lawyering. The 6th edition (2021) addresses resources for LGBTQ+ prisoners and the Prison Rape Elimination Act.

== Notable jailhouse lawyers ==
- Mumia Abu-Jamal
- Calvin Duncan
- B. Kwaku Duren
- Shon Hopwood; after his release, went to law school and became a professor of law.
- Brett Kimberlin
- Howard Marks
- Burt Pugach, as recounted in the 2007 film Crazy Love.
- Jerry Rosenberg
- Arthur William Taylor
- Melvin Williams
- Angola Three
- Clarence Gideon
- Andre Evans, won his freedom in 1998 from the Texas Department of Criminal Justice.
- Larry Lawton
- Jonathan Lee Riches
- Martin Sostre
- Carol Crooks, who was at the center of the August Rebellion.
- Sean Swain, anarchist author and radio personality.

== See also ==
- Pro se legal representation
