= Paula Franzese =

American legal scholar

Paula Ann Franzese
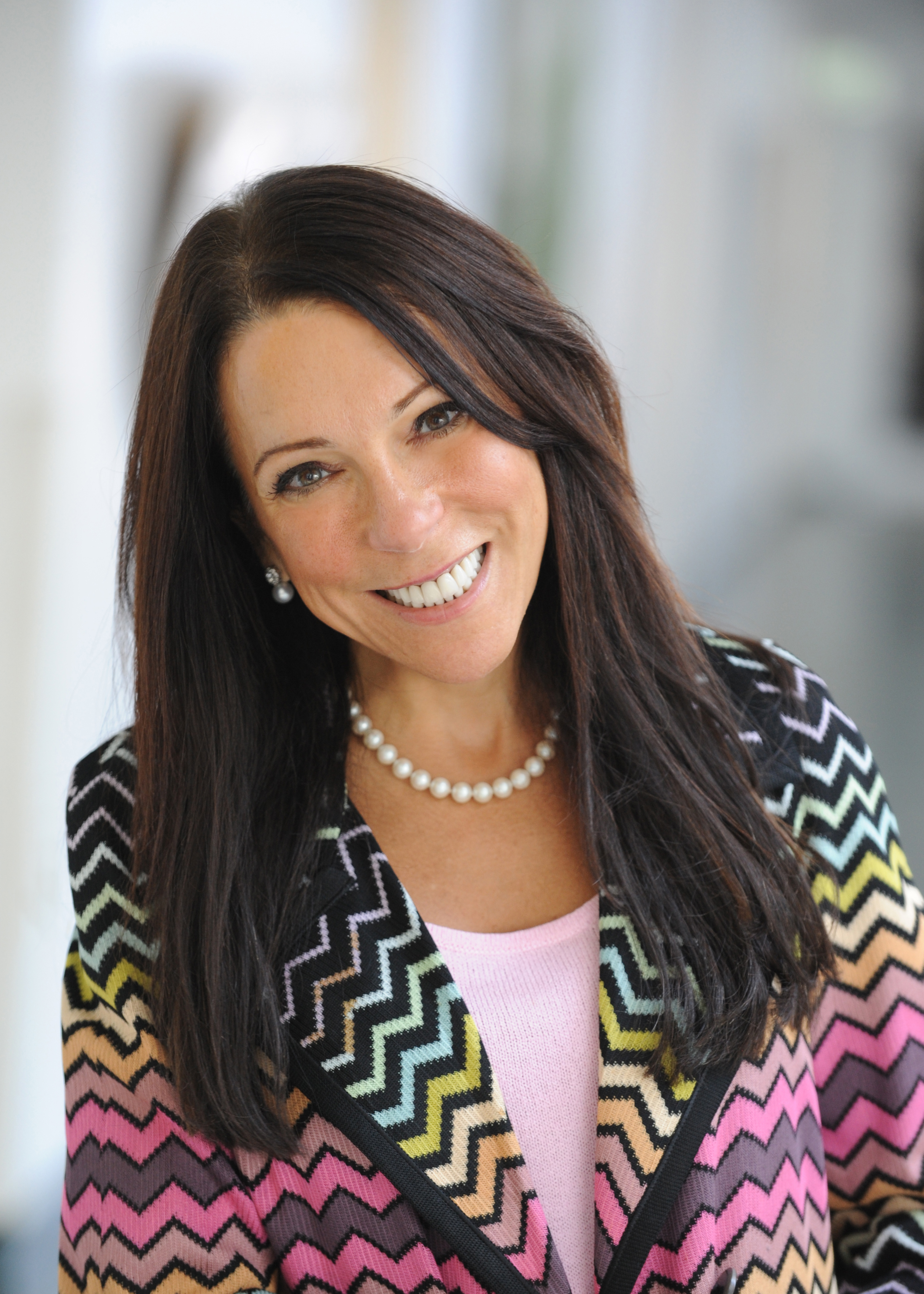
- Children: 2

Academic background
- Education: Barnard College (BA); Columbia University (JD)

Academic work
- Discipline: Legal scholar
- Institutions: Seton Hall University
- Main interests: Property law

Paula Ann Franzese is an American legal scholar based in New Jersey who focuses on government ethics and property law. She is the Peter W. Rodino Professor of Law at the Seton Hall University School of Law. Franzese is an educator who has been named one of the 26 best law teachers in the United States. She is also a prominent advocate for government ethics reform, a spokesperson for legal education, a housing advocate, and an author.

== Career ==
Franzese graduated summa cum laude, Phi Beta Kappa, with a bachelor's degree from Barnard College. Franzese received a Juris Doctor degree from Columbia Law School and won several academic prizes, including the Rosenman Prize for excellence in public law courses.

Franzese became a professor of law at Seton Hall Law School in 1986, and she later became the Peter W. Rodino Professor of Law at Seton Hall. In 2020, she was named one of the Top Women in Law by the New Jersey Law Journal.

== Scholarship ==
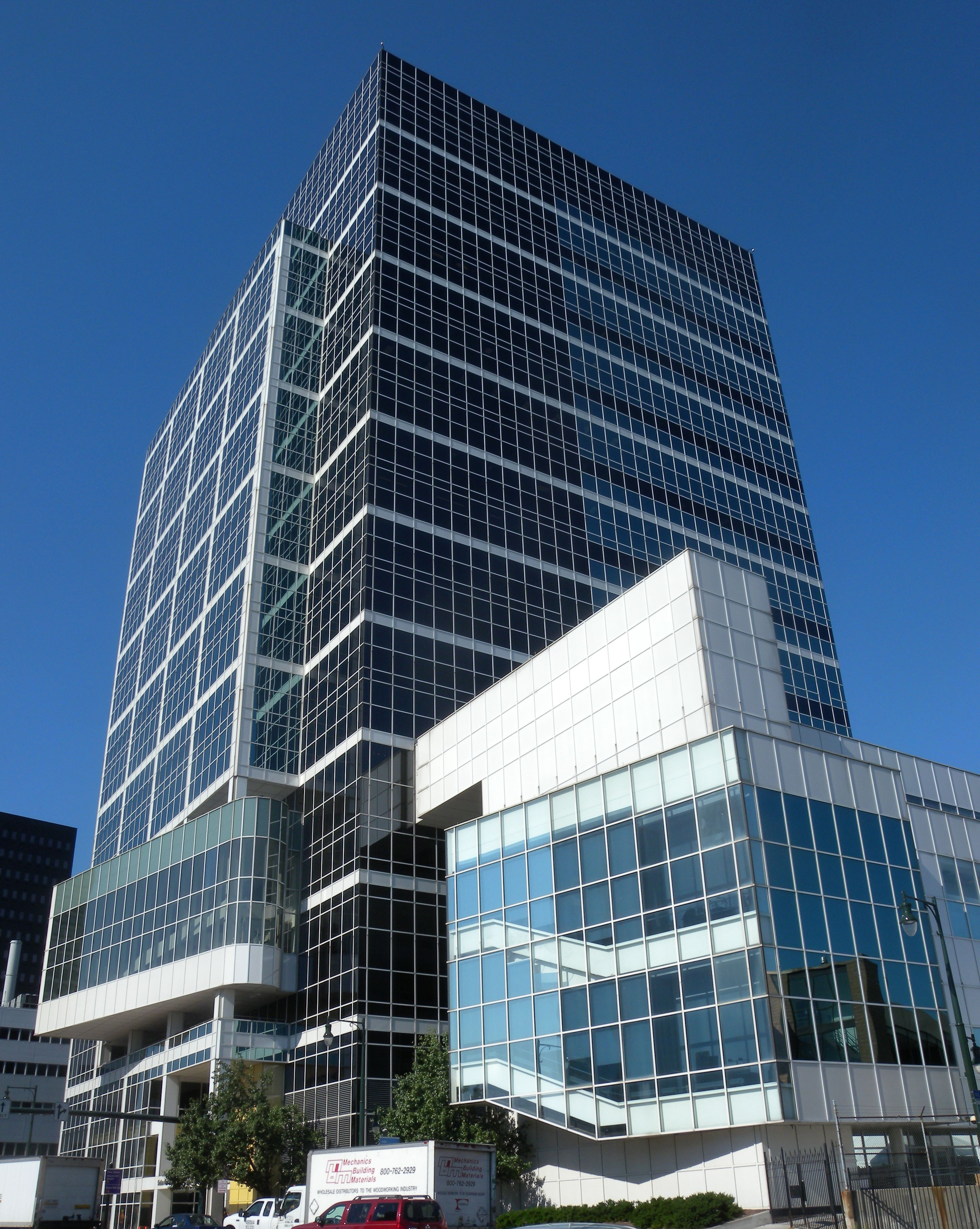
Building at Seton Hall's school of law in Newark, New Jersey.

Franzese's scholarship focuses on two main areas of the law: government ethics and property law. Her research into property law includes landlord-tenant reform, common interest communities including homeowners' boards, and affordable housing, including a legal analysis of the Mount Laurel doctrine. In addition to her scholarship, Franzese wrote two general-purpose guidebooks for students, including A Short & Happy Guide To Being A College Student and A Short & Happy Guide To Being A Law Student. Franzese has advocated for a right to counsel for low-income tenants facing eviction and moderated fair housing programs.

== Teaching ==
Franzese was featured as one of the 26 best law teachers in the nation in the book What the Best Law Teachers Do and has been named as an Exemplary Teacher by the American Association of Higher Education. In 2019, the Seton Hall Student Bar Association's Professor of the Year Award was renamed the Paula A. Franzese Professor of the Year Award in her honor after she won the award 10 times. Franzese was recognized as one of twenty Inspiring Women in Education by SheKnows media for her volunteer efforts teaching middle school students civics and has presented on education as a human right at the UN International Human Rights Summit. Franzese pioneered the cause of law-related and civic education during her tenure as President of the Justice Resource Center, the largest non-profit provider of law-related and civic education for grades four through twelve. Franzese also lectured for ten years at BarBri, a bar-exam preparation firm, serving as its national lecturer on property law.

At Seton Hall Law, she is the director of The Leadership Fellows Program. The Program includes "a distinguished speakers series, mentoring component and opportunities for experiential learning that include implementation of a community-based leadership project." She has written on the benefits of a J.D. degree and reasons to go to law school.

== Ethics and Reform Advocacy ==
Franzese is an advocate of ethics reform. As Special Ethics Counsel, she and retired Justice Daniel J. O'Hern promulgated the Uniform Ethics Code in New Jersey, a pioneering statutory achievement that has become a model for national replication. She has published and presented on best practices for ethics reform and restoring the public trust. She received the National Council on Governmental Ethics Laws (COGEL) Award, the highest honor conferred by the organization, in recognition of her "significant, demonstrable and positive contributions to the fields of campaign finance, elections, ethics, freedom of information and lobbying over a significant period of time."

In 2014 and again in 2016, Franzese criticized the administration of New Jersey Governor Chris Christie, stating that officials in the administration conflated their official duties with campaign efforts.

== Publications ==
=== Law Review articles ===
- The Lawyer-Hero: Lessons in Leadership for Lawyers from Watergate to the Present Day, 54 University of Toledo Law Review 359 (2023)
- Disrupting Dispossession: How the Right to Counsel in Landlord-Tenant Proceedings Is Reshaping Outcomes, 52 Seton Hall Law Review 1255 (2022)
- The Anatomy of Government Ethics Reform: Lessons Learned, A Path Forward, 35 Notre Dame Journal of Law, Ethics and Public Policy 523 (2021)
- An Inflection Point for Affordable Housing: The Promise of Inclusionary Mixed-Use Redevelopment, 52 Univ. of Illinois at Chicago John Marshall Law Review 581 (2020)
- Promises Still to Keep: The Fair Housing Act Fifty Years Later, 40 Cardozo Law Review 3 (2019)
- A Place to Call Home: Tenant Blacklisting and the Denial of Opportunity, 45 Fordham Urban Law Journal 661 (2018)
- The Implied Warranty of Habitability Lives: Making Real the Promise of Landlord Tenant Reform, 68 Rutgers Law Review 1 (2017)
- The Power of Empathy in the Classroom, 47 Seton Hall Law Review 1 (2017)
- Empathic Teaching, Empathic Learning, 21 The Law Teacher 54 (2014)
- Law Teaching for the Conceptual Age, 44 Seton Hall Law Review 1 (2014)
- New Jersey Common Interest Communities: Predictors of Distress and an Agenda for Reform, 63 Rutgers Law Review 101 (2011)
- Reclaiming the Promise of the Judicial Branch: Toward a More Meaningful Standard of Judicial Review as Applied to New York Eminent Domain Law, 38 Fordham Urban Law Journal 1091 (2011)
- The Twin Rivers Case: Of Homeowners Associations, Free Speech Rights and Privatized Mini-Governments, 5 Rutgers Journal of Law & Public Policy 4 (2008)
- Trust and Community: The Common Interest Community as Metaphor and Paradox, 72 Univ. of Missouri Law Review 1110 (2007)
- Privatization and Its Discontents: Common Interest Communities and the Rise of Government for the "Nice.", 37 The Urban Lawyer 335 (2005)
- Restoring the Public Trust: An Agenda for Ethics Reform of State Government and a Proposed Model for New Jersey, 57 Rutgers Law Review 1175 (2005)
- Solutions to the Crisis in Affordable Housing: A Proposed Model for New York City, 3 Rutgers Journal of Law & Urban Policy 84 (2005)
- Does it Take A Village? Privatization, Patterns of Restrictiveness and the Demise of Community, 47 Villanova Law Review 553 (2002)
- Audiotape and CD course on property law, Thomson, 2003.

=== Books and book chapters ===
- Learning Core Commercial Law Concepts (West, 2d ed., 2022) (with Epstein, Barnes & Tu)
- Housing and Hope: Private Property and Catholic Social Teachings, appearing in Christianity and Private Law (2021) (with A. Carmella)
- When Home Is Uninhabitable: Realizing Essential Tenant Safeguards in New Jersey Law, chapter in New Jersey Landlord Tenant Law (LexisNexis, 2020)
- Housing and Hope: Private Property and Catholic Social Teachings, appearing in Christianity and Private Law (2019)
- Learning Core Commercial Law Concepts: Course Materials (West, 2018)
- A Short & Happy Guide to The Law of Sales (West, 2018)
- Street Smarts for Women Lawyers, NYC Bar Press (2016) (Contributing Author)
- A Short and Happy Series (Twelve Titles) (West, 2015) (Creator and Editor)
- Experiencing Property (West, 2015)
- A Short & Happy Guide To Being A Law Student (West, 2014)
- A Short & Happy Guide To Being A College Student (West, 2014)
- Beyond Privatopia: Rethinking Residential Private Government, appearing in Journal of Regional Science (2012)
- Strategies and Techniques of Law School Teaching: Property (Aspen Publishing, 2012)
- A Short & Happy Guide To Property (Thompson, 2011)
- Law and Class in America, T. Jones, ed. (2009)
- Property Law and the Public Interest, Third Edition (Lexis, 2007)
- Reaction and Reform in New Jersey, Ethics Reform Recommendations for The Executive Branch of New Jersey Government (Hall Institute, 2007) (with Justice Daniel J. O'Hern)
- The Affective Assistance of Counsel: Practicing Law As a Healing Profession (Carolina Academic Press, 2006)
- Residential Privilege: The Advent of the Guarded Subdivision, appearing in America's Second Gilded Age? Perspectives on Law and Class Differences (NYU Press, 2005)
- The Law According to Skyboxes (2005) (Contributor)
- Legends of the Law on Property, Thomson (2003)
- Strategies and Techniques for Teaching Property, Aspen publishers.
- Legend of the Law, Gilbert series, in property law, Harcourt Brace, 1996.
