= RLJ (disambiguation) =

RLJ may refer to:

- RLJ Companies, asset management firm
- RLJ Entertainment, film production company and home video distributor
- Rutgers Law Journal, quarterly law review

== See also ==
- R+L=J
