= Columbia Journal of Tax Law =

- Discipline: Tax law
- Language: English
- Edited by: Farhan Khaddad

Publication details
- History: 2010-present
- Frequency: Triannual

Standard abbreviations
- ISO 4: Columbia J. Tax Law

Indexing
- ISSN: 2169-4680
- OCLC no.: 720334071

The Columbia Journal of Tax Law is a law journal covering tax law and policy. It publishes three issues each year featuring scholarly articles, shorter works on current policy topics, and student notes. The journal was established in 2010 and is edited by students at Columbia Law School. The current editor-in-chief is Farhan Khaddad.

== Tax Matters ==
Each issue of the journal includes "Tax Matters", a series of op-eds by tax practitioners in response to a current topic in tax law. The topic is chosen by a tax academic.

== Student board ==
The journal is run by a student board. The board is separated into two parts - an executive board and an editorial board. The executive board manages the operations of the journal, selects the articles and oversees the article editing process. The editorial board manages the editorial process, conducts the business of the journal, and manages its website.

== Roberts & Holland Prize ==
The journal awards an annual cash prize to the author of the best student note. The award is sponsored by the law firm of Roberts & Holland LLP. The winner is selected by a vote of the journal board.

== Past editors-in-chief ==
The following persons have been editors-in-chief:

- Suyash Paliwal (2009-2010)
- Yan Shurin (2010-2011)
- Tamar Lusztig (2011-2012)
- Arjun Sivakumar (2012-2013)
- Meir Lax (2013-2014)
- James Parks (2014-2015)
- Deborah Plum (2015-2016)
- Arisa Manawapat (2016-2017)
- Laura Pond (2017-2018)
- Zhiyuan Zuo (2018-2019)
- Eli Dubin (2020-2021)
- Stephen Groh (2022-2023)
- Ethan Mackey (2023-2024)
- Seth Stancroff (2024-2025)
