= David G. Epstein =

American law professor

David Gustav Epstein is the George E. Allen Professor of Law at University of Richmond School of Law and an expert on bankruptcy.

Epstein was raised in Texas by a Jewish family. Epstein received a B.A. from the University of Texas in 1964, a J.D. from the University of Texas School of Law in 1966, and an LL.M. from Harvard Law School in 1969. While a student at UT, he became a member of the Alpha Epsilon Pi fraternity. He was also a clerk for the Texas Supreme Court.

For twenty-five years, Epstein has been the primary Barbri lecturer on the topic of contracts, and his lectures have thus been viewed by upwards of a million students. He has coauthored textbooks on bankruptcy, commercial law, contracts, and corporations. In 2004, the Commercial Law League of America honored him with their Lawrence P. King Award for Excellence in the Field of Bankruptcy.

Epstein has taught at numerous schools and has been the Dean of two of them, the University of Arkansas School of Law and the Emory University School of Law. He has been a tenured law professor at Southern Methodist University, the University of North Carolina Law School, and the University of Texas Law School, the Charles E. Tweedy Jr. Chair of Law at the University of Alabama Law School, and a visiting professor at Harvard, as well as Georgetown University Law Center, the University of Michigan Law School, the New York University Law School and the University of Chicago Law School.

In 2006, he became Of Counsel to the law firm of Haynes and Boone, working out of their office in Dallas, Texas, one day a week.

== Books ==
- Cases and Materials on Contracts: Making and Doing Deals (6th Edition) (2022)
- A Short & Happy Guide To Contracts, with Bruce A. Markell & Lawrence Ponoroff (Short and Happy Series, 2012) West Publishing ISBN 978-0-314-27793-0
- Making and Doing Deals: Contracts in Context (2nd Edition) (2006)
- Business Structures, with Richard D. Freer, Michael J. Roberts, George Shepherd (American Casebook Series, 2006)
- Bankruptcy: 21st Century Debtor-Creditor Law, with Bruce A. Markell, Steve H. Nickles, Elizabeth L. Perris, (West Publishing, January 2005 [1st edition]; November 2005 9 [2nd edition])
- Bankruptcy and Related Law in a Nutshell (Nutshell Series, 2005)
- Business Structures in a Nutshell, with Joseph Shade (Nutshell Series, 2003)
- Debtor-Creditor Law in a Nutshell (Nutshell Series, 1991)
- Debtors and Creditors: Cases and Materials, with Jonathan M. Landers, and Steve H. Nickles (American Casebook Series, 1987)
