= A Jailhouse Lawyer's Manual =

- Discipline: Jurisprudence
- Language: English, Spanish (Immigration Supplement only)
- Edited by: Peyton Lepp

Publication details
- History: 1978–present
- Publisher: Columbia Human Rights Law Review (United States)

Standard abbreviations
- ISO 4: Jailhouse Lawyer's Man.

Links
- Journal homepage

A Jailhouse Lawyer's Manual ("the JLM") is a resource for incarcerated individuals and jailhouse lawyers. It is published and distributed by the editors of the Columbia Human Rights Law Review, who are students at Columbia Law School. The JLM is designed to assist inmates in understanding their legal rights as prisoners. It contains information about how to challenge convictions and sentences, the rights of the incarcerated, and different ways to obtain an early release from prison.

== History and content ==
Founded in 1978, the twelfth and most recent edition of the JLM was published in 2020. A Spanish-language translation of the fifth edition of the JLM ("SJLM") was produced, but is now out of date; the JLM is working to release an updated SJLM within the next two years. The book also has a section about human rights law.

=== Supplements ===
In addition to the main manual, the JLM produces specific supplements for the following states:

- Texas
- Louisiana

The JLM is working to produce supplements for other states as well.

The JLM also publishes an Immigration and Consular Access Supplement in English, and is working towards a Spanish translation.

== Distribution and cost ==
Each year, over one thousand copies of the JLM are sent to prisoners, as well as to prisons and jails, libraries, and other organizations that work in the criminal justice field. For prisoners or their families, the cost of the JLM is $30; for institutions, the cost is $150. A full copy of the JLM, separated by chapter, is available for free on the JLM's website.

== Reception ==
Associate Justice of the Supreme Court of the United States Thurgood Marshall wrote in a 1992 forward to the JLM that "[b]y making difficult and sensitive legal issues accessible to the lay person, the manual helps to empower prisoners to exercise a right we, as a society, hold dear—the right to speak for oneself. I commend Columbia's law students for publishing so comprehensive and insightful a manual. A Jailhouse Lawyer's Manual should be read by everyone involved in, or concerned about, prisoners' rights."
