= Rutgers University Law Review =

- Language: English
- Edited by: Christopher Terlingo, John Byrnes

Publication details
- History: 2015 to present
- Publisher: Rutgers University Law School (USA)
- Frequency: 5 issues/year

Standard abbreviations
- Bluebook: Rutgers U. L. Rev.
- ISO 4: Rutgers Univ. Law Rev.

Indexing
- ISSN: 2374-3859
- LCCN: 2014202668
- OCLC no.: 887242446

Links
- Journal homepage

Rutgers University Law Review is an American law review created in 2015 from the merger of Rutgers Law Review and Rutgers Law Journal. It is edited and published by students at Rutgers Law School.

== History ==
In 2015 Rutgers School of Law–Newark and Rutgers School of Law–Camden announced a merger into a single law school with two campuses. Many of the existing specialty law journals on each campus would be retained after the merger, but it was decided to combine the two general law reviews into a single journal.

The combined journal commenced operations in 2015, over a year before the formal merger of the law schools. The new Rutgers University Law Review retained the volume numbering from Rutgers Law Review, making the inaugural 2015 volume #67. The 2015 volume published six issues, three on each campus, but subsequent volumes are published five issues per year.

Individual elements from the predecessor journals have been retained. For example, an annual issue on State Constitutional Law remains in the tradition of the Journal, and an annual Symposium issue is published in the tradition of the original Review. The Law Review has two Editor-in-Chief positions, each representing one of the two campuses.

== Prominent alumni ==
Because of the combined nature of the Rutgers University Law Review, prominent alumni from both preceding journals are included.

- Ronald Chen - acting dean of the law school and former public advocate for the State of New Jersey
- Nancy Floreen - former Montgomery County Councilmember, At Large
- Diana Terry - Judge, Colorado Court of Appeals
- Senator Elizabeth Warren - former professor of law at Harvard Law School
