= Eric Talley =

American legal scholar

- Born: Eric Leonard Talley; Los Alamos, New Mexico, U.S.

Academic background
- Education: University of California, San Diego (BA); Stanford University (PhD, JD)

Academic work
- Discipline: Law
- Sub-discipline: Corporate law Corporate governance Financial law
- Institutions: Columbia University; University of California, Berkeley

Eric Leonard Talley is an American legal scholar working as the IIsidor and Seville Sulzbacher Professor at Columbia Law School and faculty co-director of the Ira M. Millstein Center for Global Markets and Corporate Ownership.

== Early life and education ==
Talley is a native of Los Alamos, New Mexico. He earned a Bachelor of Arts degree in political science and economics from the University of California, San Diego, a PhD in economics from Stanford University, and a Juris Doctor from Stanford Law School.

== Career ==
Talley's scholarship focuses on corporate law, governance, and finance. He also teaches and researches in the areas of mergers and acquisitions, quantitative methods, machine learning, contract and commercial law, alternative investments, game theory, and economic analysis of law.

Prior to joining Columbia University, Talley served as the Rosalinde and Arthur Gilbert Foundation Professor in Law, Business and the Economy at the UC Berkeley School of Law.
