= William H. Simon =

Academic background
- Education: Princeton University (AB); Harvard University (JD)

Academic work
- Discipline: Law
- Sub-discipline: Professional responsibility Social policy Regulatory law Legal profession
- Institutions: Columbia Law School; Harvard Law School; Stanford Law School; UC Berkeley School of Law

William H. Simon is an American legal scholar working as the Arthur Levitt Professor of Law and Everett B. Birch Professor in Professional Responsibility of Law at Columbia Law School.

== Education ==
Simon earned a Bachelor of Arts degree from Princeton University in 1969 and a Juris Doctor from Harvard Law School in 1974.

== Career ==
Simon's areas of expertise are professional responsibility and social policy. From 1981 to 2003, he was a professor at Stanford Law School. Simon was also a visiting professor at Harvard Law School and the UC Berkeley School of Law. He joined Columbia Law School as a visiting professor in 2001 and became a full professor in 2003.

He is best known for his public stance against unethical lawyers selling unjustified written legal opinions to clients who use such dubious advice to escape criminal consequences of their actions.

== Recent publications ==
- "The Market for Bad Legal Advice: Academic Professional Responsibility Consulting as An Example," Stanford Law Review (forthcoming 2008);
- "Wrongs of Ignorance and Ambiguity: Lawyer Responsibility for Collective Misconduct," Yale Journal of Regulation (2005);
- "Destabilization Rights: How Public Law Litigation Succeeds," Harvard Law Review (2004) (with Charles Sabel).
