= Barbri =

Bar exam education company

- Industry: Bar examination education
- Founded: 1967
- Headquarters: Dallas, Texas, USA
- Website: www.barbri.com

Barbri (styled BARBRI or barbri) is a company headquartered in Dallas, Texas, whose primary product offering is a bar review course. Because of the general difficulty of state bar exams, a majority of law school graduates choose to take some form of preparation course. Barbri offers law school graduates a six to seven week review course which features lectures by law professors on the seven major areas covered on the Multistate Bar Examination (MBE) – torts, contracts, real property, evidence, criminal law, civil procedure and constitutional law – along with additional lectures on the specific law of the state in which the participant plans to take the bar.

== History ==
The company's predecessors were founded in the 1950s by William A. Rutter in California and in 1967 by three Chicago attorneys – Richard Conviser, Lewis Collens and Beardsley Ruml. The Southeast was developed by Steven H. Levine, and the Northeast was developed by Stan Chess. In 1974, New York City-based publisher Harcourt, Brace, Jovanovich bought San Francisco-based Bay Area Review (BAR) and Chicago-based Bar Review Inc. (BRI) and promptly merged them together. The new subsidiary was officially known as "Harcourt Brace Jovanovich Legal and Professional Publications," but was marketed under the brand name BAR/BRI. William A. Rutter became chairman and CEO.

In 2001, Reed Elsevier (owner of LexisNexis), as part of its acquisition of Harcourt, sold off certain Harcourt assets like BAR/BRI to its rival Thomson Corporation (owner of Westlaw). In April 2011, Barbri was sold to Leeds Equity Partners. In March 2021, Barbri was sold to Francisco Partners.

In July 2022, Barbri acquired Strafford, an online education company for attorneys, accountants, and other professionals.

== Courses and faculty ==
Barbri offers preparation courses in every state and the District of Columbia for both the summer and winter administration of the bar exam. In many larger states live presentations are available in one or more locations during the summer course. The course is also offered remotely in additional locations, often on or near law school campuses. Barbri also provides a "home study" version of the course, in which students can access or make-up lectures through the Barbri website, or by using a mobile device. The course consists of lectures on substantive law, multiple choice question review, a practice administration of the multistate bar exam, and practice essay questions. Most lectures last three to four hours. Barbri also provides course books which include summaries of the substantive law, note-taking outlines, and practice questions. Most Barbri lecturers are full-time tenured law professors, and some have lectured for the company for many years. Among long-time Barbri lecturers include Erwin Chemerinsky (UC Berkeley); John Diamond (UC Hastings); Stanley Johanson (Texas); Faust Rossi (Cornell); Richard Freer (Emory University School of Law); Michael D. Sabbath (Mercer); Roger Schechter (George Washington); John "Kip" Cornwell (Seton Hall Law School); Paula Franzese (Seton Hall Law School); Michael Spak (Chicago-Kent College of Law), Lewis Collins (Chicago-Kent College of Law), David G. Epstein (University of Richmond School of Law), and Irving Younger (University of Minnesota Law School).

Barbri also launched in the UK in 2021, preparing candidates for the new Solicitors Qualifying Examination.
