= Francis M. Ssekandi =

Ugandan lawyer, judge and academic

Francis M. Ssekandi (born 29 September 1940 in Mbarara, Uganda), is a lecturer in law at the Columbia Law School and, since 1 July 2007, a judge of the World Bank Administrative Tribunal. He has published articles on law and development, human rights and good governance. Ssekandi is a former judge in the High Court/Justice of Appeal (1972–1974) and a member of the Uganda Supreme Court (1974–1979).

== Biography ==
Ssekandi graduated in 1965 with LL.B (Hons) from the University of London and obtained his LL.M from Columbia Law School. He became a judge of the High Court of Uganda in 1974 and later justice of appeal of the now renamed Supreme Court of Uganda. Before becoming a judge, he was the director of the Law Development Center, Uganda's premier research and professional legal training institution, and was the pioneer of the highly successful Uganda Bar Course conducted by the Center. He joined the United Nations in 1981 and was a principal legal advisor to the United Nations development programmes and was also in charge of the commercial law cluster resolving commercial disputes with the United Nations. He negotiated several technical co-operations agreements with governments and initiated many innovative institutional legal models for the delivery of UN programmes, including the Joint United Nations Programme on HIV/AIDS (UNAIDS), the African Management Services Company (AMSCO), the Global Environment Facility (GEF) and United Nations Compensation Commission after the 1991 Iraq war. In 1996, he became a deputy to the secretary general's special representative in Liberia, in charge of peacekeeping operations there.

In 1997, he was appointed general counsel of the African Development Bank where he was the anchor for the institutional reforms carried out by President Omar Kabbaj, including revision of the bank's charter to incorporate new voting rights for shareholders, and establishment of an administrative tribunal to judge staff disputes. Ssekandi retired from the African Development Bank in 2000 and has since combined teaching at Columbia and consulting with the United Nations, its agencies and other international institutions. He was appointed a member of the World Bank Administrative Tribunal from 2007 to 2013.

He is the author of many articles on international law and international economic law. He edited Judge Elis's second revised edition of New Horizons in International Law (1992).

As a judge, he pioneered the integration of customary law into the general law of Uganda and wrote a number of authoritative opinions on land tenure. He currently lectures on African law and development at the Columbia University Law School. He is a board member on a number of NGOs, including the International Institute of Rural Reconstruction (IIRR), the War and Peace Centre and the International Law Institute (Uganda). He is also the founder of the African Law Reporter and founding member of the International Projects and Mediation Associates, LLC (IPMA).
