= Rutgers Law School =

Public law school in New Jersey, US

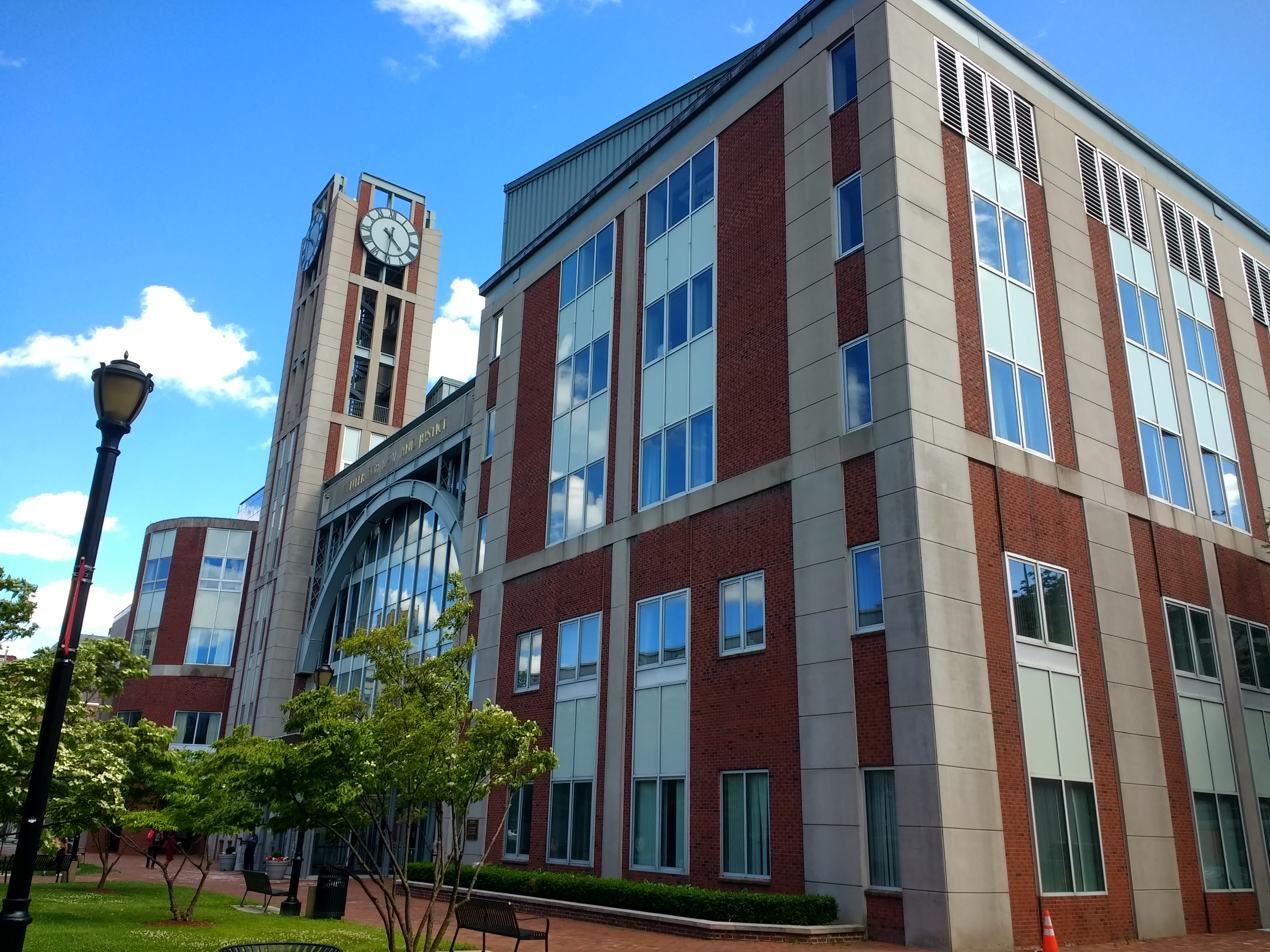
- Center for Law & Justice, Newark.
- Motto: Sol iustitiae et occidentem illustra. "Sun of justice, shine also on the West."
- Parent school: Rutgers University
- Established: 1908
- School type: Public
- Dean: Johanna Bond
- Location: Newark and Camden, New Jersey, United States; 40.7405°N 74.1732°W
- Enrollment: 1,121 (873 full-time, 237 part-time)
- Faculty: 308
- USNWR ranking: 100th (tie) (2026)
- Bar pass rate: 74.6%
- Website: law.rutgers.edu
- ABA profile: Rutgers Law School Profile

Rutgers Law School is the law school of Rutgers University, with classrooms in Newark and Camden, New Jersey. It is the largest public law school and the 10th largest law school, overall, in the United States. Each class in the three-year J.D. program enrolls approximately 350 law students. Although Rutgers University dates from 1766, its law school was founded in Newark in 1908. Today, Rutgers offers the J.D. and a foreign-lawyer J.D., as well as joint-degree programs that combine a J.D. with a graduate degree from another Rutgers graduate program.

According to Rutgers Law School's 2016 ABA-required disclosures, 93.7% of the Class of 2016 obtained full-time, long-term, JD-required or JD-advantage employment nine months after graduation, excluding solo practitioners.

== History ==
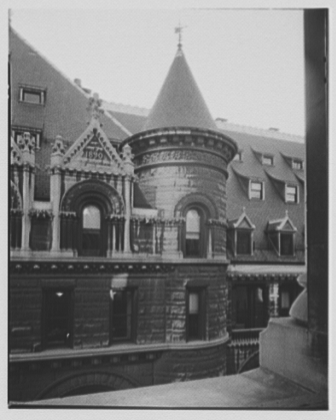
Original site of New Jersey Law School, a predecessor school of Rutgers Law

Rutgers Law School is the oldest law school in New Jersey. Rutgers Law School has its roots in three law schools. The first was founded October 5, 1908 as New Jersey Law School, the second, South Jersey Law School founded in 1926 by Collingswood, New Jersey mayor and businessmen Arthur E. Armitage and a group of South Jersey lawyers, and the final was Mercer Beasley School of Law, named for Mercer Beasley, a former New Jersey Supreme Court Justice and founded in 1926 by several prominent Newark attorneys.

The New Jersey Law School was founded as a for-profit law school by Richard D. Currier, a New York lawyer and graduate of Yale and New York Law School. Currier was joined by Charles M. Mason, a New Jersey attorney, who served as dean until his death in 1928. The school originally had only three faculty members 30 students with classes on the 4th floor of the Prudential Insurance Home Office in Newark for their first classes. In December 1908, the school was moved to a large Victorian townhouse at 33 East Park Street also in Newark. From its founding, women were to be admitted on "equal basis to men."

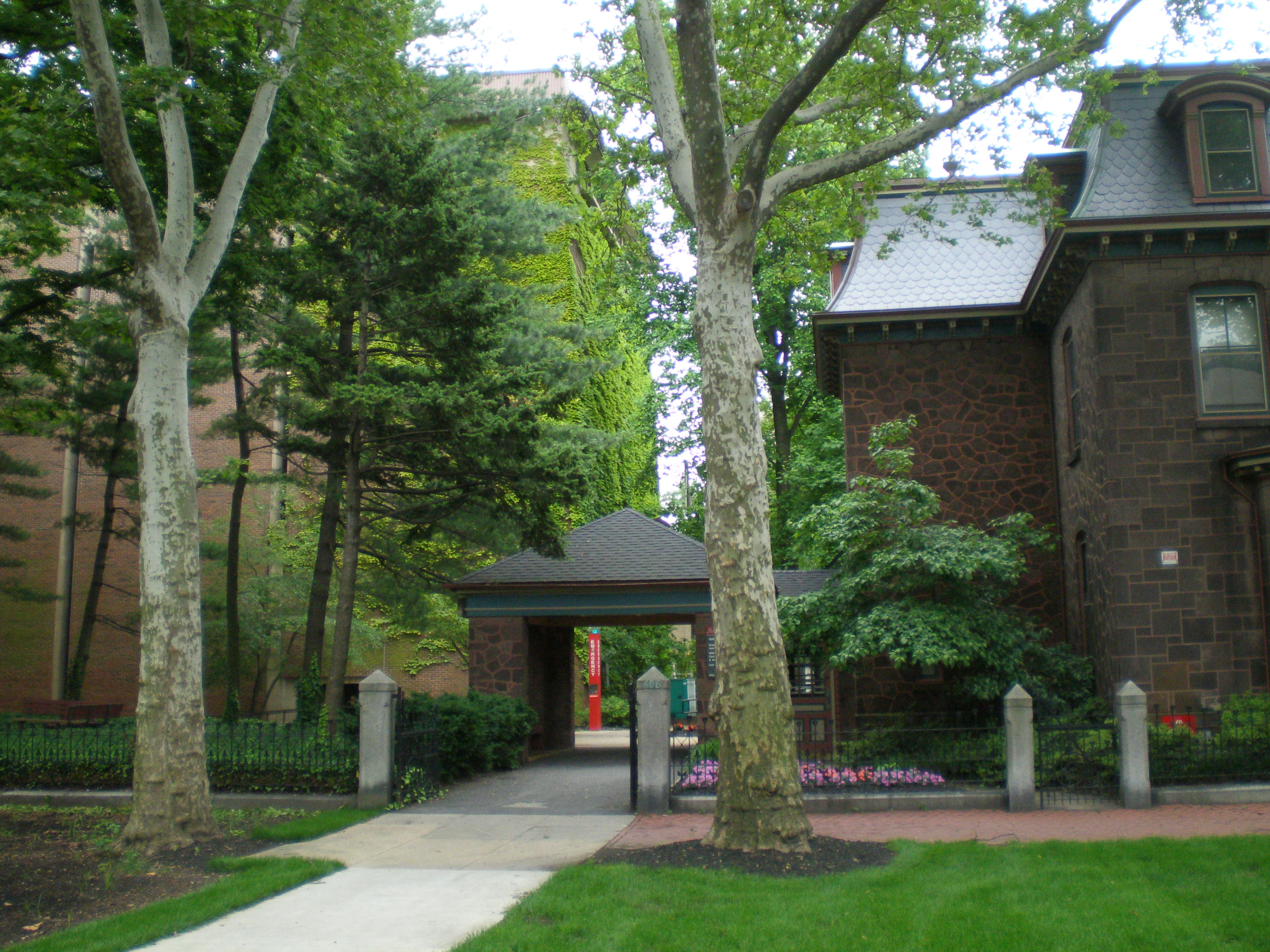
Rear law school courtyard at the Camden campus

After World War I, the New Jersey Law School saw increase in enrollment and by 1927, enrollment had peaked to more than 2,300 students, making it the second largest law school in the United States. In 1927 the school moved to the former Ballantine & Sons Ale Brewery at 40 Rector Street.

In 1934, Mercer Beasley School of Law and Newark Institute of Arts and Sciences merged to form the University of Newark and two years later, the New Jersey Law School joined establishing the University of Newark Law School. Combining the resources of the schools was designed created a stronger institution however the law school experienced a major decline in enrollment due to World War II and therefore was in a precarious financial condition.

In 1946, the University of Newark merged with Rutgers University and the law school was renamed the Rutgers University School of Law. In 1950, the South Jersey Law School in Camden, New Jersey, merged with Rutgers University. The school was divided between the Newark Division and the South Jersey division based in Camden, with the dean and law school administration based in Newark. During the 1950s and 1960s the law school expanded in size creating the largest law library in New Jersey and its faculty tripled in size. In 1963, the future U.S. Supreme Court Justice Ruth Bader Ginsburg was hired as a law professor and served on the faculty until 1972. Ginsburg developed some of the concepts that led to the founding of the Women's Rights Litigation Clinic by Professor Nadine H. Taub, who was its director for many years, and the Women's Rights Law Reporter the first American legal journal dedicated women's rights.

In 1967, the South Jersey Division was split and created as a separate unit, creating two law schools: Rutgers School of Law – Camden and Rutgers School of Law – Newark. In 1968, following the Newark riots of 1967, the faculty created the Minority Students Program (MSP) one of the first law school affirmative action programs in the country, with the goal of increasing African American student enrollment. In 1978, the law faculty voted to admit students regardless of race and revamped the Minority Students Program to focus on socio-economically disadvantaged students in response to the Supreme Court's decision in Bakke. In Doherty V. Rutgers School Of Law-Newark the 3rd Circuit Court of Appeals upheld the MSP in a lawsuit from a white student alleging discrimination. Throughout the 1970s the Newark campus was a center of activism and law students nicknamed it "The People's Electric Law School." Its graduates from this period include United States Senators Elizabeth Warren and Bob Menendez. After eliminating its evening program in 1955, in 1975, the law school restarted an evening program on Camden and Newark campus. From 1965 to 1978 the Newark division of the law school was located on Akerson Hall. In 1978, it moved to a skyscraper at 15 Washington Street which was renamed in honor of billionaire media baron Samuel I. Newhouse Sr., a 1916 graduate of the law school. In January 2000, the school moved to the Center for Law and Justice, a newly constructed 225,000-square-foot, six-story building at 123 Washington Street in Newark. In 2015, Rutgers School of Law–Newark and Rutgers School of Law–Camden were unified into a single, jointly administered Rutgers Law School with two campuses.

== Lawsuits ==
Dean Johanna Bond has been named in three discrimination lawsuits since becoming Dean in 2023. She is defending her position and the position of Rutgers Law School and its employees. These lawsuits have not been ruled on or settled.

On April 27, 2026, Director Jeff Balog of the business office, filed a complaint in the Superior Court of New Jersey, alleging whistle-blower retaliation and discrimination resulting in his wrongful termination he reported similar financial misappropriation. Rutgers Law School Dean Johanna Bond and Associate Dean Paul Rollins are named in the lawsuit.

On March 8, 2026, Dean Cliff Dawkins of the Minority Student Program filed a complaint in New Jersey Federal Court alleging discrimination and retaliation for reporting financial misappropriation and asking for $4.5 million dollars in damages. The lawsuit names Rutgers Law School Dean Johanna Bond, Vice Dean Shani King, and Professor Charles Auffant.

On January 1, 2024, an Orthodox Jewish Rutgers Law student, Yoel Ackerman, sued in Essex County Superior Court in New Jersey alleging antisemitism and a hostile environment. Rutgers Law School Dean Johanna Bond, as well as Rutgers Law School were named in the suit.

== Admissions ==
In 2018, Rutgers had a 48% acceptance rate, with 2,535 applications for admission and 1,237 offers. For the 2018 admitted students, the LSAT 75% – 25% was 158-153 and the UGPA 75% – 25% was 3.61 – 3.08. Rutgers' admissions process offers applicants a choice between competing for admission based primarily on traditional measures such as LSAT scores and college GPAs, or, alternatively, on the basis of an applicant's life experience, with a lesser (though still significant) emphasis placed on traditional factors. Factors that may be considered in the Rutgers admissions process include, but are not limited to, work experience, personal accomplishments, and other aspects of the applicant's personal background.

Rutgers' admissions process is particularly significant when contrasted with the efforts of some law schools to maximize the undergraduate GPA and LSAT scores of their incoming classes, while increasing the number of part-time students whose GPA and LSAT scores are not counted toward rankings, in order to improve their standing in popular law school ranking publications.

== Academics ==
The J.D. program at Rutgers requires a total of 84 credits to graduate. The 1L curriculum requires traditional courses in Torts, Contracts, Property, Criminal Law, Civil Procedure, Constitutional Law, and Legal Analysis, Writing and Research Skills.

All required courses are graded on a standard 2.95 – 3.1 GPA curve. 1Ls are grouped in small sections of roughly 30 people, who take all of the same required classes together. Though two or three sections are generally combined for required courses, each student has a 'small section' class where their section of 30 or fewer people is taught a required subject by a tenured faculty member. Students may choose to attend classes on either a full-time or part-time basis.

== Journals ==
The law school has nine student journals:

- Rutgers University Law Review (a merger of Rutgers Law Review and Rutgers Law Journal)
- Rutgers Computer and Technology Law Journal, the first journal in the country to address the interaction between computers, technology and the law.
- Women's Rights Law Reporter, the first journal in the country to focus on women's rights. Co-founded by then–Rutgers Professor Ruth Bader Ginsburg and Professor Nadine H. Taub.
- Rutgers Journal of Law and Public Policy, previously known as the Rutgers Journal of Law and Urban Policy, focuses on current public policy issue in the United States.
- Rutgers Journal of Law and Religion was founded in 1999 and is one of the few journals on law and religion.
- Rutgers Law Record, the first online law journal in the United States.
- Rutgers Race and the Law Review was founded in 1996 and is the second journal in the country to focus on the broad spectrum of multicultural issues.
- Rutgers Business Law Review, formerly known as the Rutgers Bankruptcy Law Journal.
- Rutgers International Law and Human Rights Journal, is one of the newest journals at Rutgers Law School.

The Business Law Review and International Law and Human Rights Journal were accredited in December 2019.

== Costs ==
Tuition and fees at Rutgers law School for the 2016–2017 academic year is $27,011 (full-time, in-state) and $39,425 (full-time, out-of-state).

== Rankings ==
According to the U.S. News & World Report Law School Rankings for 2026, the law school is ranked tied for 100th overall, with its part-time program ranking 23rd overall out of 70 schools, and its Legal Writing program ranking 8th in the country. The U.S. News rankings are based on successful placement of graduates, faculty resources, academic achievements of entering students, and opinions by law schools, lawyers and judges on overall program quality; however, U.S. News, per its data for 2019, has separately ranked the law school 9th in the country where full-time graduates who borrowed for law school and entered the private sector had the highest salary-to-debt ratio.

The National Law Journal ranked the law school 47th on its 2015 list of the Top 50 Go-To Law Schools. It was the only law school in New Jersey to appear on that list, which reported that 10.1% of the law school's 2014 graduates were hired directly by one of the country's top 250 law firms.

The law school ranks 41st in the nation in the 2019 Above the Law Rankings, which weighs graduate employment, quality of graduate jobs, education cost, alumni feedback, student debt, and the number of alumni serving as federal judges.

Finally, the law school is ranked 30th according to Business Insider's 2014 'Top Law Schools in America' list.

== List of notable alumni ==
- J. Mercer Burrell (1890–1969), New Jersey Legislature and civil rights attorney who represented the Trenton Six
- David A. Christian (born 1948, class of 2011), retired United States Army captain and former candidate for United States Senate, class of 2011
- Louis Freeh (born 1950), former FBI director, class of 1974
- Bill Martini (born 1947, class of 1972), U.S. Representative and federal judge
- Bob Menendez (born 1954, class of 1979), former US senator from New Jersey and convicted felon
- Scott P. Myren (class of 1988), associate justice, South Dakota Supreme Court
- Ozzie Nelson (1906–1975, class of 1930), actor, filmmaker, musician and bandleader, who originated and starred in The Adventures of Ozzie and Harriet
- Hazel R. O'Leary (born 1937, class of 1966), former United States Secretary of Energy
- Barry Ted Moskowitz (class of 1975), California federal district judge
- Zahid Quraishi (class of 2000), New Jersey federal district judge
- Jacqueline C. Romero (class of 1996), US attorney for the Eastern District of Pennsylvania
- Esther Salas (class of 1994), New Jersey federal district judge
- Robert Torricelli (class of 1977), former United States senator from New Jersey
- Elizabeth Warren (class of 1976), US senator from Massachusetts
- Robin Wiessmann (class of 1978), director of Pennsylvania Housing Finance Agency

== People associated with Rutgers Law School ==
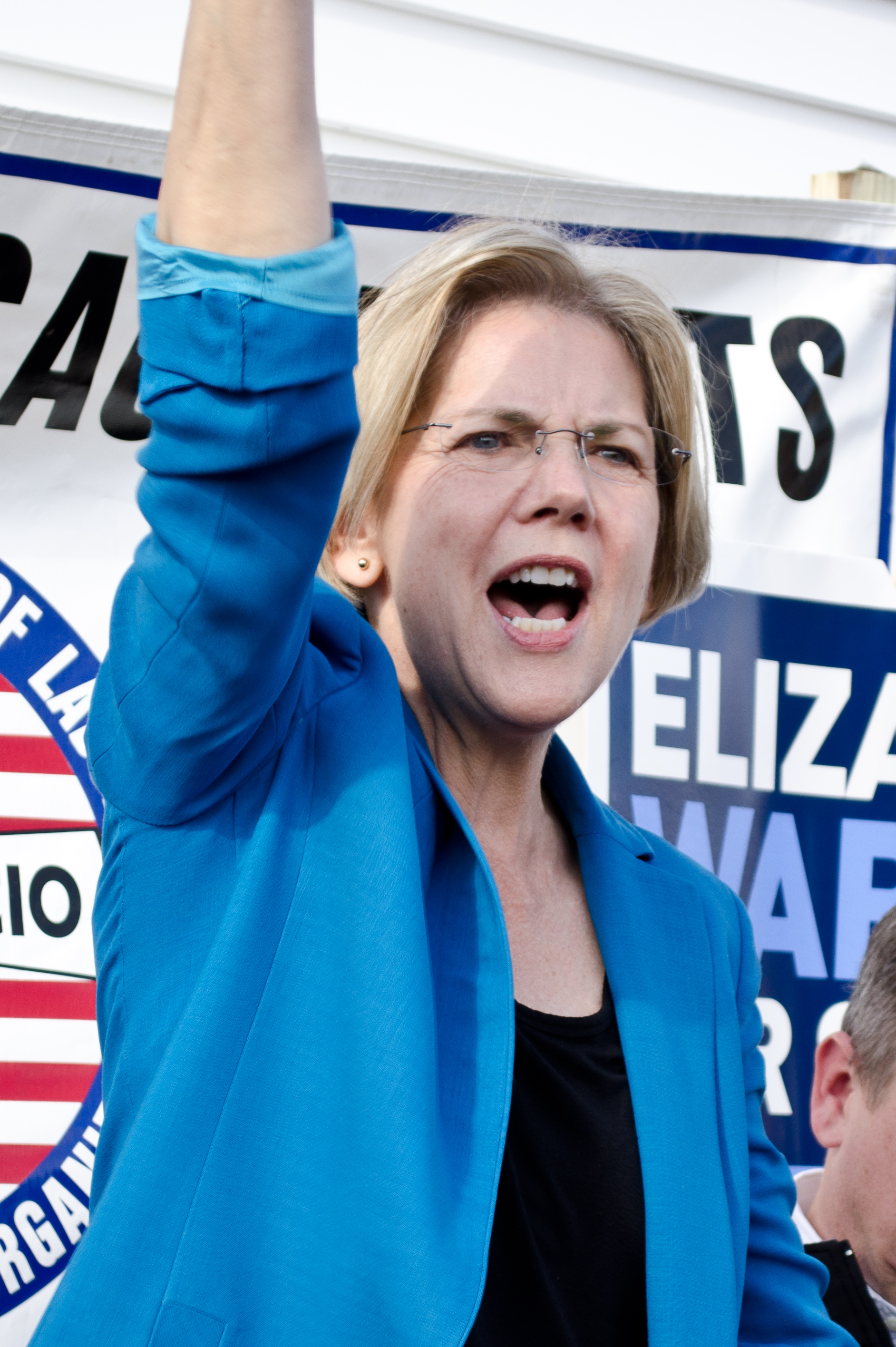
Elizabeth Warren, US Senator 2013–present

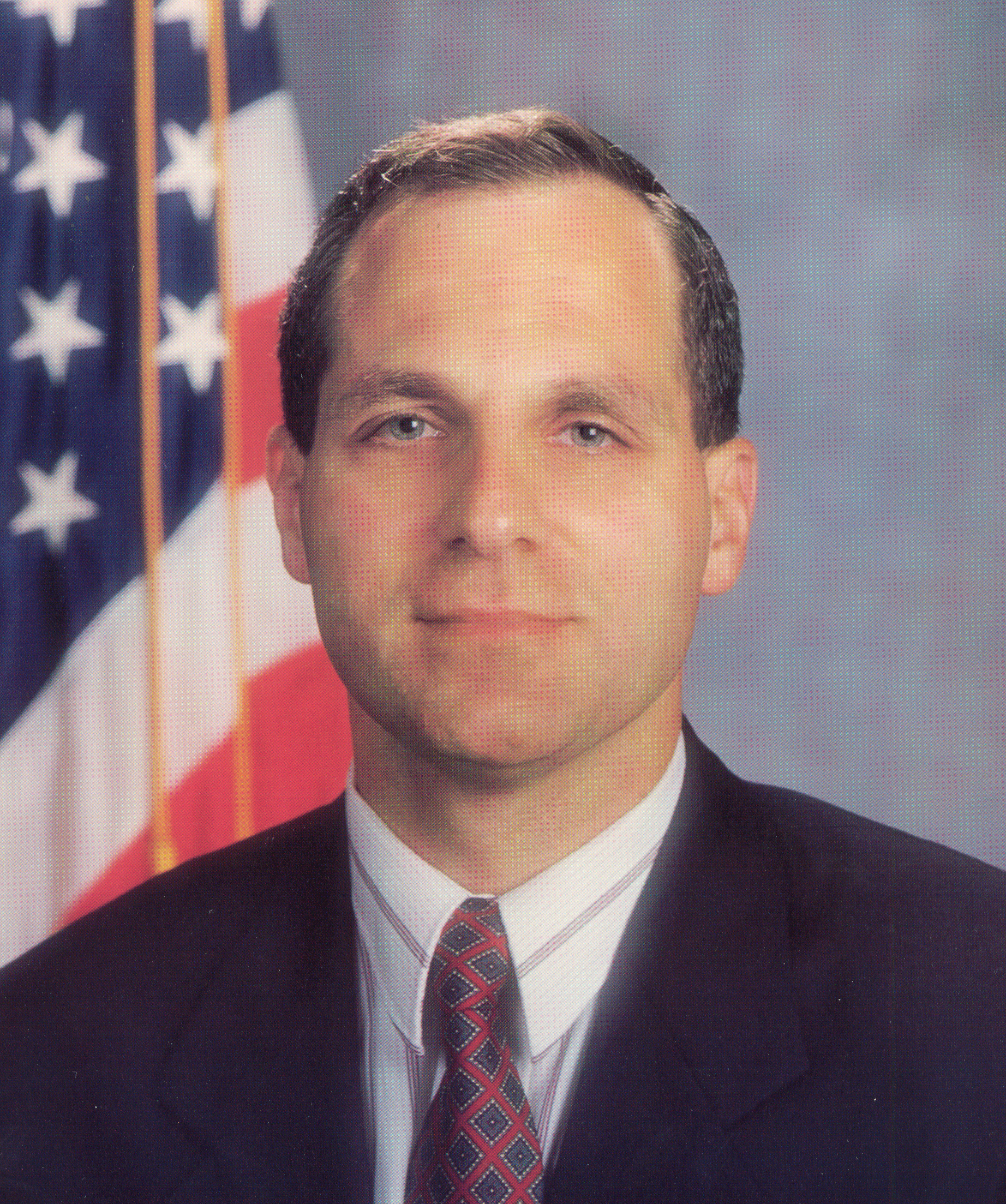
Louis Freeh, FBI Director 1993–2001

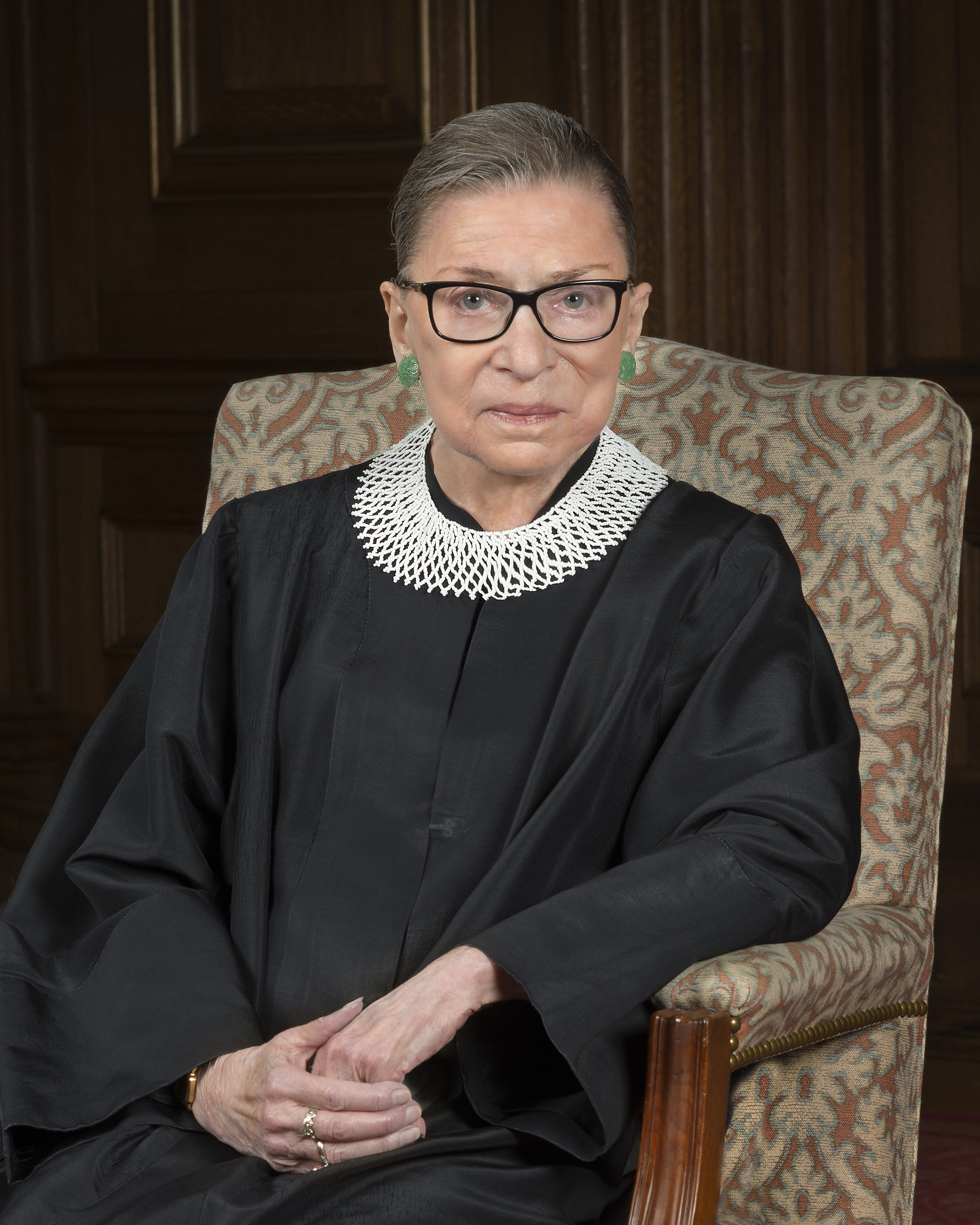
Ruth Bader Ginsburg, Associate Justice of the Supreme Court of the United States
(faculty 1963 to 1972) (deceased)

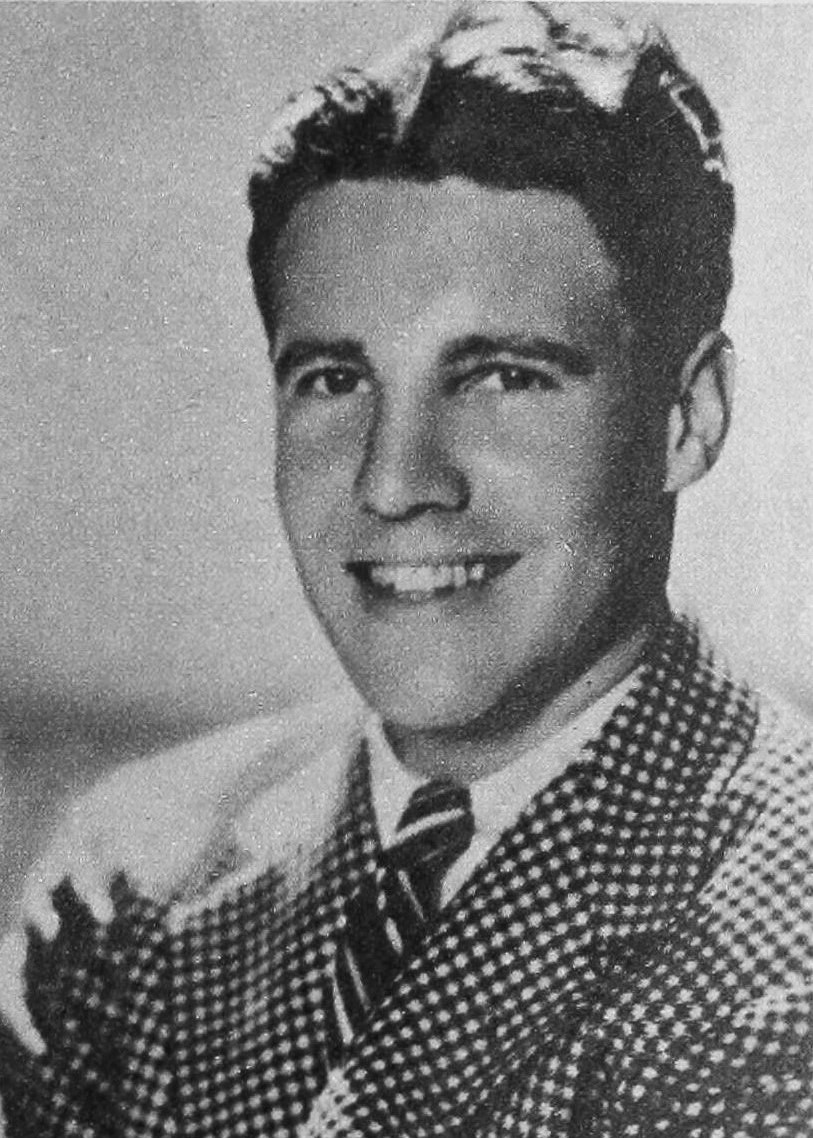
Ozzie Nelson, actor (deceased)

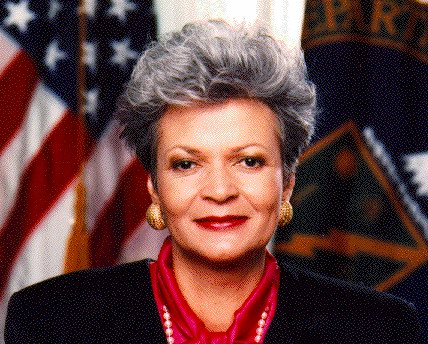
Hazel R. O'Leary, US Secretary of Energy
1993–97

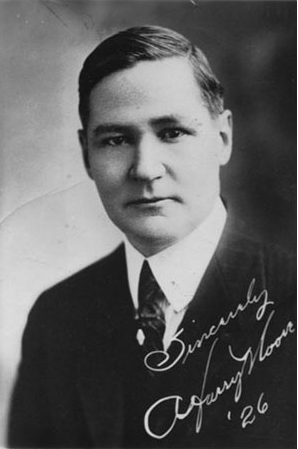
A. Harry Moore, Longest serving Governor of New Jersey in the 20th century
(deceased)

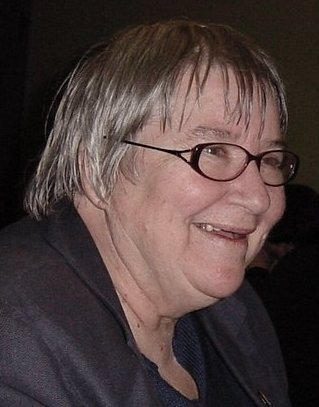
Lynne Stewart, criminal defense attorney convicted and disbarred for providing material support to terrorists (deceased)

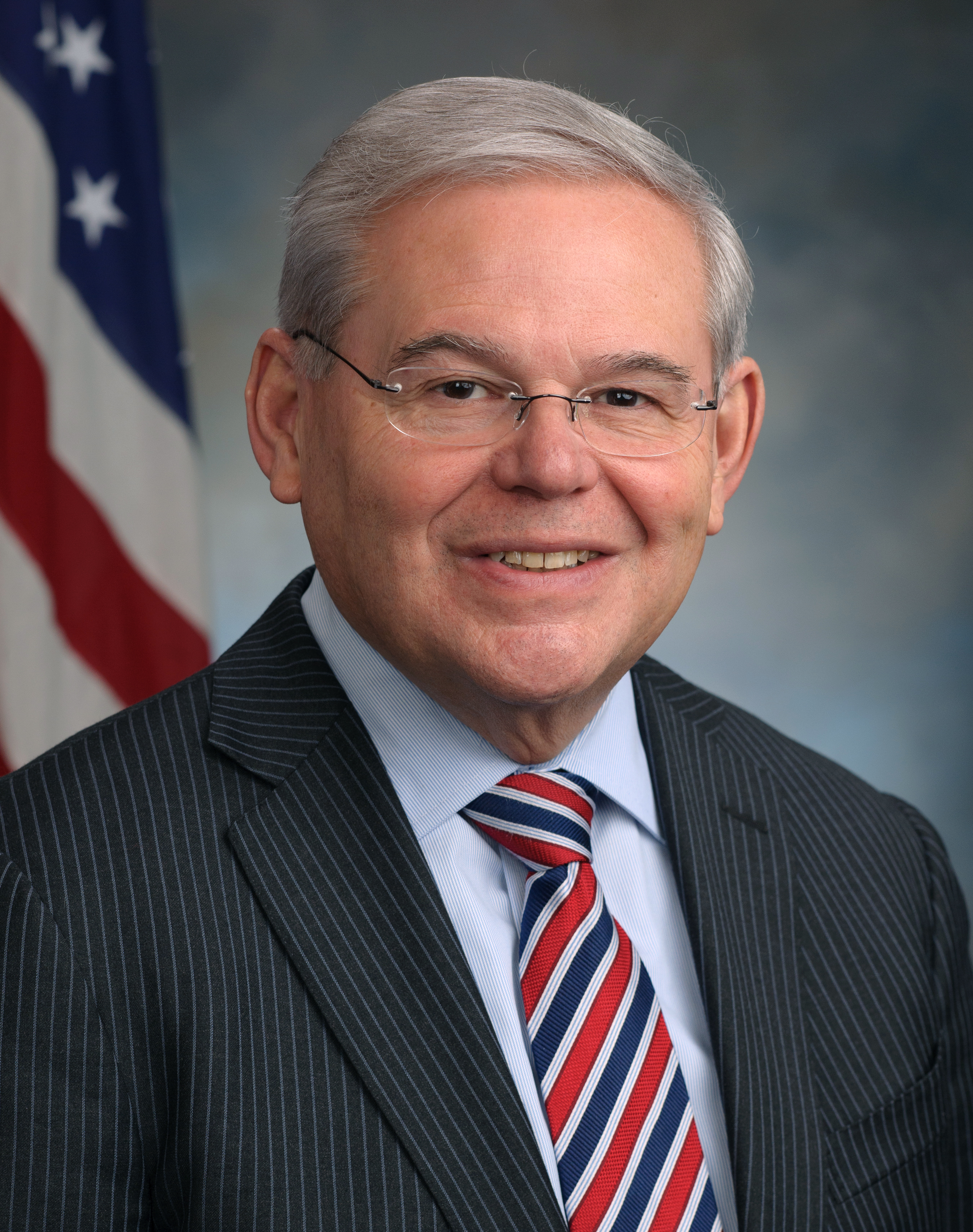
Bob Menendez, US Senator 2006–2024

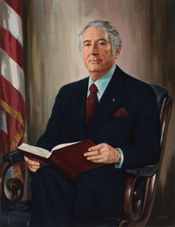
Peter W. Rodino, one of the longest serving members of US Congress from New Jersey
(deceased)

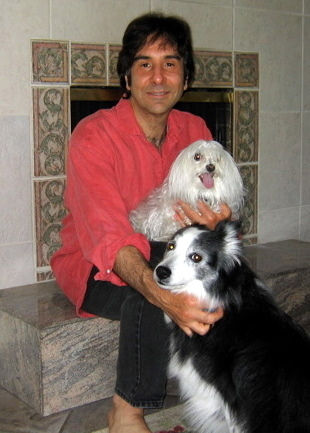
Gary L. Francione, founder of animal law (faculty 1995 – present)

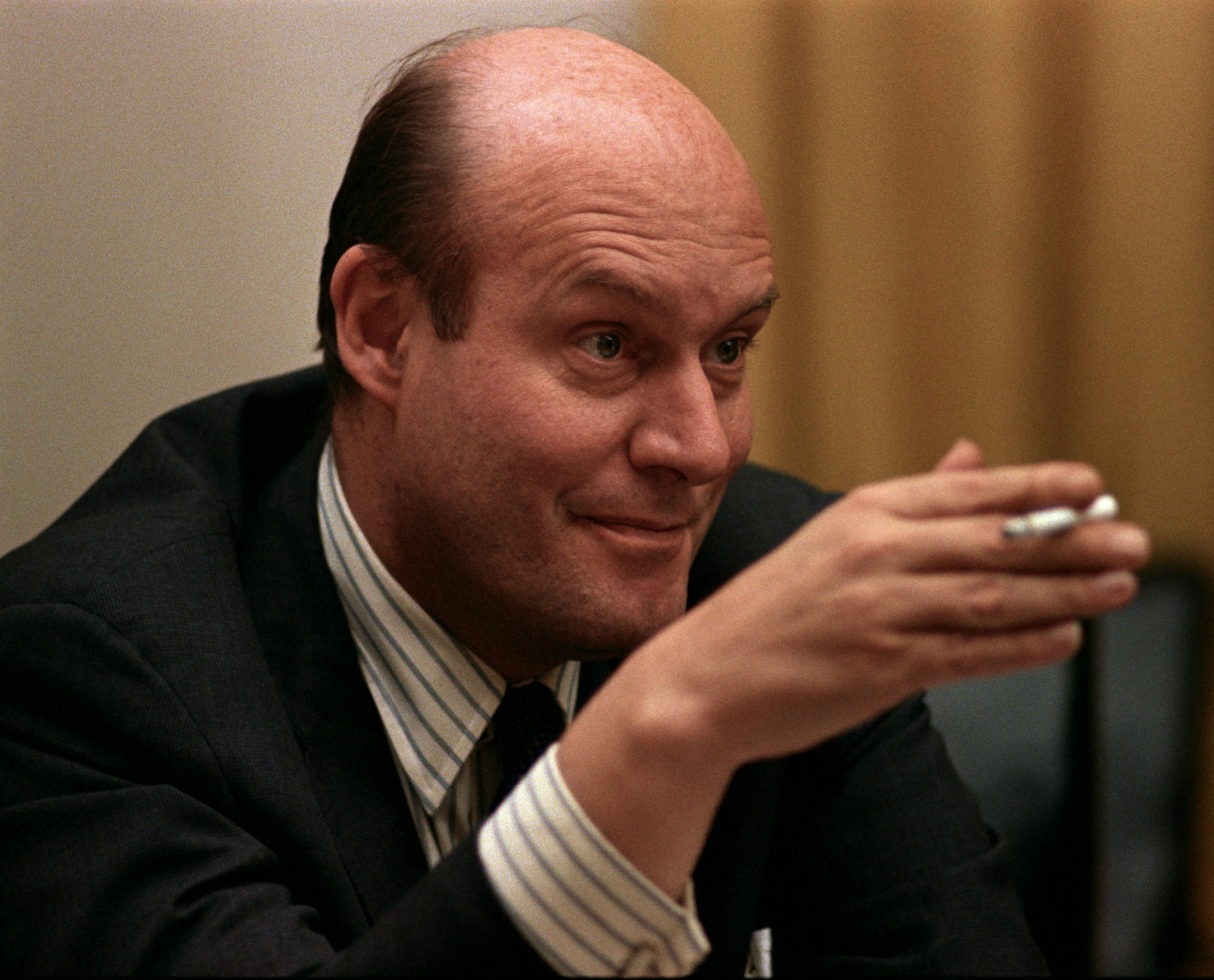
Nicholas Katzenbach, US Secretary of State 1966–69 and US Attorney General 1965–66
(faculty 1950–51) (deceased)

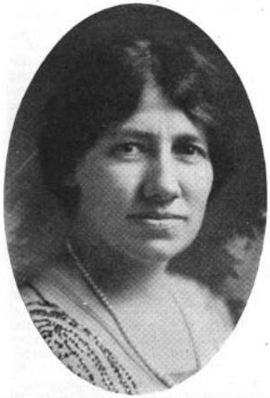
Paula Laddey, Newark suffragist, admitted to bar in 1913
(deceased)
