= Paula Laddey =

German-born American lawyer

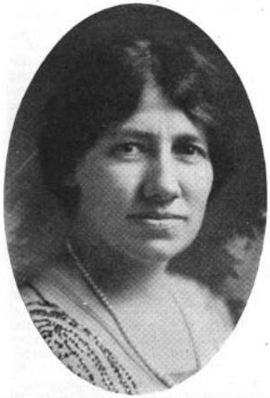
- Born: May 1, 1879; Mannheim, Germany
- Died: August 2, 1966; Nogales, Arizona
- Occupation(s): Lawyer, clubwoman

Paula Laddey (May 1, 1879 – August 2, 1966) was a German-born American lawyer.

== Early life and education ==
Laddey was born in Mannheim, the daughter of Clara Schlee Laddey and Victor H. G. Laddey. Her mother was a lecturer, and president of the New Jersey Woman's Suffrage Association from 1908 to 1912. She moved to the United States with her family as a child in 1888. She graduated from New York University in 1906, and earned a law degree from Newark Law School in 1911.

== Career ==
=== Law and clubwork ===
From 1908 to 1913, Laddey was a probation officer in Newark. In 1913 she was admitted to the practice of law in New Jersey. In time she was also admitted to the bar in Massachusetts, New Hampshire, and Vermont. She represented the New Jersey Legal Aid Society at a national conference in 1916, and in 1919 served on a committee of the National Conference of Social Work. She wrote about workers' compensation laws for the Women Lawyers' Journal. She also spoke in favor of women serving on juries. In 1924 she spoke before a United States Senate subcommittee on the Permanent Court of International Justice.

Laddey served on the board of trustees for the State Home for Girls in Newark. In 1914 she reported on the Conference on the Education of Backward, Truant, Delinquent, and Dependent Children, held that year in Memphis. In 1919 she was a founding member of the National Federation of Business and Professional Women's Clubs, and served as the organization's first treasurer.

In 1936 and 1937, Laddey gave a series of lectures on women's rights, for the League of Women Voters and the Woman's Club of Upper Montclair. She spoke at a Montclair church in 1941, on the subject "Why Women Should Make Wills". She spoke on the same subject in Vermont in 1952.

=== With Beatrice Henry ===
Laddey had a longtime law practice in New Jersey, in partnership with suffragist Vernona Beatrice Henry. In 1916, Laddey and Henry were both on the pageant auxiliary committee for the 250th anniversary of the City of Newark. Both women were active in the Societa Nazionale Dante Alighieri, hosting meetings of the Italian cultural interest group in their home. In 1953, the two and a third woman, Katharine Smith, incorporated a firm called Heel-ins, to manufacture shoe components in St. Albans, Vermont. Laddey and Henry also ran the North Country Press together.

== Personal life ==
Paula Laddey and Beatrice Henry were law partners, and they shared a home in St. Albans Bay, Vermont, with their friend and colleague, Katharine Smith. Henry died in 1954; Paula Laddey moved to Nogales, Arizona to live near her nephew David Laddey, and died there in 1966, aged 87 years.
