= Jerry Rosenberg =

American criminal & convict (1937–2009)

- 1957 mugshot
- Born: Jerome Rosenberg; May 23, 1937; Brooklyn, New York, U.S.
- Died: June 1, 2009 (aged 72); Alden, New York, U.S.
- Other name: Jerry the Jew
- Conviction: First degree murder
- Penalty: Death; commuted to life imprisonment

Jerome "Jerry" Rosenberg (May 23, 1937 – June 1, 2009) was a New York State convict, mobster, and jail house lawyer. He was incarcerated for 46 years, longer than any other prisoner in New York State history. Rosenberg was sentenced to death for his involvement in the 1962 double homicide of two New York City police officers during a robbery carried out with two other Mafia-connected gangsters. His sentence was commuted to life in prison in June 1965, after capital punishment was abolished (save for premeditated murder of law enforcement) in New York. Rosenberg went on to become the first New York State inmate to earn a law degree and in turn gave legal advice to several inmates, including the leaders of the Attica Prison riot. A book was written about Rosenberg and his time in prison which was adapted into a 1988, made-for-TV movie, Doing Life, starring Tony Danza.

== Robbery and murder ==
In 1962, Rosenberg took part in the robbery of Borough Park Tobacco Company in Brooklyn alongside two other Italian-American Mafia-connected gangsters. The robbery was unsuccessful and resulted in the death of two responding police officers. The double homicide of New York City police officers was the first in more than three decades. With 1,000 police officers assigned to the double homicide, Rosenberg would eventually turn himself in. Upon conviction of first degree murder, Rosenberg was to be executed along with his accomplice, Anthony Portelli, who was the triggerman in the 1962 shooting. Throughout his trial and sentence, Rosenberg claimed innocence of the murders.

== Time in prison ==
In 1964, Rosenberg was to be executed (via the electric chair). Shortly before it was to take place, Governor Nelson Rockefeller commuted his sentence and that of Anthony Portelli to life in prison based on new laws that greatly reduced the use of capital punishment in New York. Under the new law, only those convicted of murdering a police officer could face a death sentence. Although the two men had been convicted of killing police officers, Rockefeller said he commuted their sentence anyways since they had been convicted of felony first degree murder, instead of premeditated first degree murder. Four years after Rosenberg's incarceration, he earned a law degree from the Blackstone Career Institute. Prior to Rosenberg, no inmate in the state of New York had ever earned a law degree.

Rosenberg was incarcerated at Attica Correctional Facility at the time of the 1971 rebellion. In the immediate aftermath of the takeover of parts of the prison on September 9, he was one of two men elected to represent C Block on the committee of men who would coordinate action by the insurgent prisoners and take leading roles in the negotiations. Rosenberg was instrumental in articulating demands for immunity from legal and other reprisals. Late on the 9th, in discussions with observers whose presence at Attica had been requested by the rebels, Rosenberg produced a draft of an injunction that, if it could be endorsed by a judge, might prevent state employees retaliating against participants in the revolt after it had ended. That night, observer Herman Schwartz, an attorney and law professor known for his commitment to the cause of prisoner rights, managed to get an injunction against “physical or other administrative reprisals” signed by both the Commissioner of Corrections Russell G. Oswald and, at 3:30 a.m., a Western District judge. However, when Schwartz presented a copy of the document to the men occupying the prison's D Yard, Rosenberg grabbed it and tore it to shreds, arguing not only that it was invalid for lack of the judge's seal, but also that it failed to address the key demand for immunity from criminal prosecution. Over the three days of negotiations that followed, the issue of full amnesty (including protection from criminal charges) proved to be a sticking point, with state officials consistently refusing to countenance the demand. When the insurrection was crushed by an assault by state troopers and corrections officers, Rosenberg was shot in the knee and beaten.

After the riot's resolution, Rosenberg was transferred to Sing Sing Correctional Facility. Circa 1986, Rosenberg was resuscitated when his heart stopped beating during open heart surgery; in 1988, he unsuccessfully argued before a judge that he had died and that this therefore meant that he had served his life sentence. He frequently assisted other prisoners with legal issues as a jailhouse lawyer and estimated he was involved in over 200 lawsuits. Rosenberg was transferred to Wende Correctional Facility in 1991, serving, among other positions within the prison, as paralegal assistant for three years in the law library. Rosenberg was transferred to prison hospital in 2000. He died of natural causes in June 2009 at the age of 72, having served 46 years in state prisons, the longest of any inmate in New York State penal history. He had been eligible for parole, but was denied release every time.

== In media ==
Rosenberg was the subject of a 1982 biography by Stephen Bello called Doing Life: The Extraordinary Saga of America's Greatest Jailhouse Lawyer; in 1988, the book was adapted for an NBC made-for-TV movie called Doing Life with Tony Danza in the role of Rosenberg and Dan Lauria as a prison corrections guard/captain. The film omits and avoids any further criminal activity Rosenberg participated in during his incarceration.

== Notes ==
=== Works cited ===
- Smith, Richard Norton (2014). On His Own Terms: A Life of Nelson Rockefeller. Random House. ISBN 978-0-375-50580-5.
- Thompson, Heather Ann (2017). Blood in the water : the Attica prison uprising of 1971 and its legacy. New York. ISBN 978-1-4000-7824-0. OCLC 970680901.
