= Women's Rights Law Reporter =

- Discipline: Law review
- Language: English

Publication details
- History: 1970-present
- Publisher: Women's Rights Law Reporter (United States)
- Frequency: quarterly

Standard abbreviations
- Bluebook: Women's Rts. L. Rep.
- ISO 4: Women's Rights Law Report.

Indexing
- ISSN: 1942-6755

Links
- Journal homepage

The Women's Rights Law Reporter is a journal of legal scholarship published by an independent student group at Rutgers School of Law—Newark. The journal was originally founded by Anne Marie Boylan out of her apartment in Newark, New Jersey. After publishing one issue, it was disbanded for lack of funding. In 1970 Rutgers law student Elizabeth Langer brought fellow law students together to restart the journal at Rutgers Law School. She recruited Professor Ruth Bader Ginsburg as faculty advisor. It was the first law journal in the U.S. to focus exclusively on women's rights. Langer became chief editor with a team of law students on board. After Professor Ginsburg left Rutgers in 1972, Professor Nadine Taub (now deceased) became faculty advisor to the journal and remained through the 1980s and 1990s. The journal provides a forum for exploring law and public policy relating to women's rights and gender. It is published quarterly.

== History and focus ==
Ann Marie Boylan, a 1970 graduate of Rutgers School of Law created the first issue of the Women's Rights Law Reporter (WRLR), published out of her apartment in Newark in 1970. Shortly after publication of the first issue, the journal was disbanded for lack of funding and support. In the fall of 1970 Rutgers law student Elizabeth Langer recruited a group of Rutgers law students to bring the Women’s Rights Law Reporter to Rutgers Law School. Langer met with the dean, James Paul, who said the Reporter would need to find a faculty advisor, office space in the school and funding. Professor Annamay Sheppard offered space in the Urban Legal Clinic building. Langer met with Professor Ruth Bader Ginsburg who agreed to become faculty advisor. Students obtained small grants from the Women’s Center at Barnard College, the Wallace Eljabar-Fund, the Women’s Division of the Board of Missions of the United Methodist Church, and the Student Bar Association of Rutgers Law School. WRLR was launched and moved onto Rutgers' campus in 1970. It became formally associated with Rutgers in 1974. Upon Professor Ginsburg’s departure in 1972, Professor Nadine H. Taub became faculty advisor and remained for many years.

On its founding advisory board were Arthur Kinoy, Pauli Murray, Eleanor Holmes Norton, Ruth Bader Ginsburg, Margot Champagne, Mary Eastwood, Riane Eisler, Ann Freedman, Jo Ann Evans Gardner, Janice Goodman, Renee Hanover, Bernice Handler, Diane B. Schulder, Faith Seidenberg, and Nancy Stearns.
