= Columbia Human Rights Law Review =

- Discipline: Jurisprudence
- Language: English
- Edited by: Amara Shein

Publication details
- Former name: Columbia Survey of Human Rights Law
- History: 1967–present
- Publisher: Sheridan (United States)
- Frequency: Triannual

Standard abbreviations
- Bluebook: Colum. Hum. Rts. L. Rev.
- ISO 4: Columbia Hum. Rights Law Rev.

Indexing
- ISSN: 0090-7944
- OCLC no.: 81109147

Links
- Journal homepage; Online Access

The Columbia Human Rights Law Review is a law review established in 1967 focusing on human rights issues. Named the Columbia Survey of Human Rights Law for its first three volumes, the journal is produced and edited by students of Columbia Law School and is "dedicated to the analysis and discussion of human rights, civil rights, and civil liberties under both domestic and international law." In 2016, the journal launched HRLR Online (now HRLR Forum), an online publication featuring shorter, cutting-edge pieces focusing on human rights.

== Content ==
The journal has published Justice Ruth Bader Ginsburg, Archbishop Desmond Tutu, Amal Clooney, Judge Morris Lasker, Vernon Jordan, Michael Posner, Vilma Martínez, Jack Greenberg, Marian Wright Edelman, Justice Albie Sachs, Eben Moglen, Louis Henkin, Gerald Neuman, Jeremy Waldron, James Liebman, Harold Hongju Koh, Mary Robinson, Aaron Edward Brown, Fionnuala Ní Aoláin, Sarah Cleveland, and Chief Justice Arthur Chaskalson, among others. Ruth Bader Ginsburg and Louis Henkin also served as faculty advisors for the journal.

== Rankings ==
The journal is currently the highest-ranked human rights law journal in the world. Since 2006, it has been the most cited human rights law journal in the world.

== A Jailhouse Lawyer's Manual ==
Since 1978, the editors of the journal have also published A Jailhouse Lawyer's Manual.

== Editors-in-chief ==
- Amara Shein (vol. 58, 2026–2027)
- Abigail Shaska Carbajal (vol. 57, 2025–2026)
- Skylar Gleason (vol. 56, 2024–2025)
- Namratha Somayajula (vol. 55, 2023–2024)
- Olivia Martinez (vol. 54, 2022–2023)
- Anahi Mendoza (vol. 53, 2021–2022)
- Caitlin Lowell (vol. 52, 2020–2021)
- Will Wilder (vol. 51, 2019–2020)
- Clarisa Reyes-Becerra (vol. 50, 2018–2019)
- Hanna L. St. Marie (vol. 49, 2017–2018)
- Julia Sherman (vol. 48, 2016–2017)
- Brian Yin (vol. 47, 2015–2016)
- Bassam Khawaja (vol. 46, 2014–2015)
- Ashley Starr Kinseth (vol. 45, 2013–2014)
- Gudrun Juffer (vol. 44, 2012–2013)
- Adam L. Shpeen (vol. 43, 2011–2012)
- Kinara A. Flagg (vol. 42, 2010–2011)
- Megan Crowley (vol. 41, 2009–2010)
- Teddy Nemeroff (vol. 40, 2008–2009)
- Beth Morales Singh (vol. 39, 2007–2008)
- Mary Kelly Persyn (vol. 38, 2006–2007)
- Brian E. Murphy (vol. 37, 2005–2006)
- Sarah Stewart (vol. 36, 2004–2005)
- Jennifer L. Co (vol. 35, 2003–2004)
- Lisa Howley (vol. 34, 2002–2003)
- Gretchen Borchelt (vol. 33, 2001–2002)
- Jennifer Arnett Lee (vol. 32, 2000–2001)
- Taryn A. Merkl (vol. 31, 1999–2000)
- Edward H. Smoot (vol. 30, 1998–1999)
- Farhad Karim (vol. 29, 1997–1998)
- Pamela J. Papish (vol. 28, 1996–1997)
- Jonathan S. Abernethy (vol. 27, 1995–1996)
- Anthony P. Ewing (vol. 26, 1994–1995)
- Michael D. Hintze (vol. 25, 1993–1994)
- Salomón Torres (vol. 24, 1992–1993)
- Ivan A. Sacks (vol. 23, 1991–1992)
- Jonathan E. Klaaren (vol. 22, 1990–1991)
- Theodore J. Piccone (vol. 21, 1989–1990)
- Ian Thomas Moar (vols. 19.2, 20.1, 1988–1989)
- Paul D. Leake (vols. 18.2, vol. 19.1, 1987–1988)
- Joseph A. Sullivan (vols. 17.2, 18.1, 1986–1987)
- Matthew H. Adler (vol. 13, 1981–1982)
- Holly Anne Clarke (vol. 12, 1980–1981)
- Regina L. Bryant (vol. 11, 1979–1980)
- Steven S. Tokarski (vol. 7, 1975–1976)
- Bruce M. Montgomerie (vol. 3, 1970–1971) (Columbia Survey of Human Rights Law)
- Marjorie A. McDiarmid (vol. 2, 1969–1970) (Columbia Survey of Human Rights Law)
- David M. Kairys (vol. 1, 1967–1968) (Columbia Survey of Human Rights Law)
