= Columbia Law School =

Private law school in New York City, New York, US

Coordinates: 40°48′25″N 73°57′37″W

- Parent school: Columbia University
- Established: 1858; 168 years ago
- School type: Private law school
- Parent endowment: $14.35 billion (2021)
- Dean: Daniel Abebe
- Location: New York City, U.S.
- Enrollment: 1,410 (2023)
- Faculty: 450 (2023)
- USNWR ranking: 9th (tied) (2026)
- Bar pass rate: 95.39% (2023)
- Website: law.columbia.edu
- ABA profile: Standard 509 Report

Columbia Law School (CLS) is the law school of Columbia University, a private Ivy League university in New York City.

The school was founded in 1858 as the Columbia College Law School. The university is known for its legal scholarship dating back to the 18th century. Graduates of the university's colonial predecessor, King's College, include such notable early-American legal figures as John Jay, the first chief justice of the United States, and Alexander Hamilton, the first secretary of the treasury, who were co-authors of The Federalist Papers.

Columbia Law has many distinguished alumni, including United States presidents Theodore Roosevelt and Franklin Delano Roosevelt; ten justices of the Supreme Court of the United States, making it the only law school to have graduated more than one chief justice; numerous U.S. Cabinet members and presidential advisers; US senators; representatives; governors; and more members of the Forbes 400 than any other law school in the world.

== History ==
=== Background ===
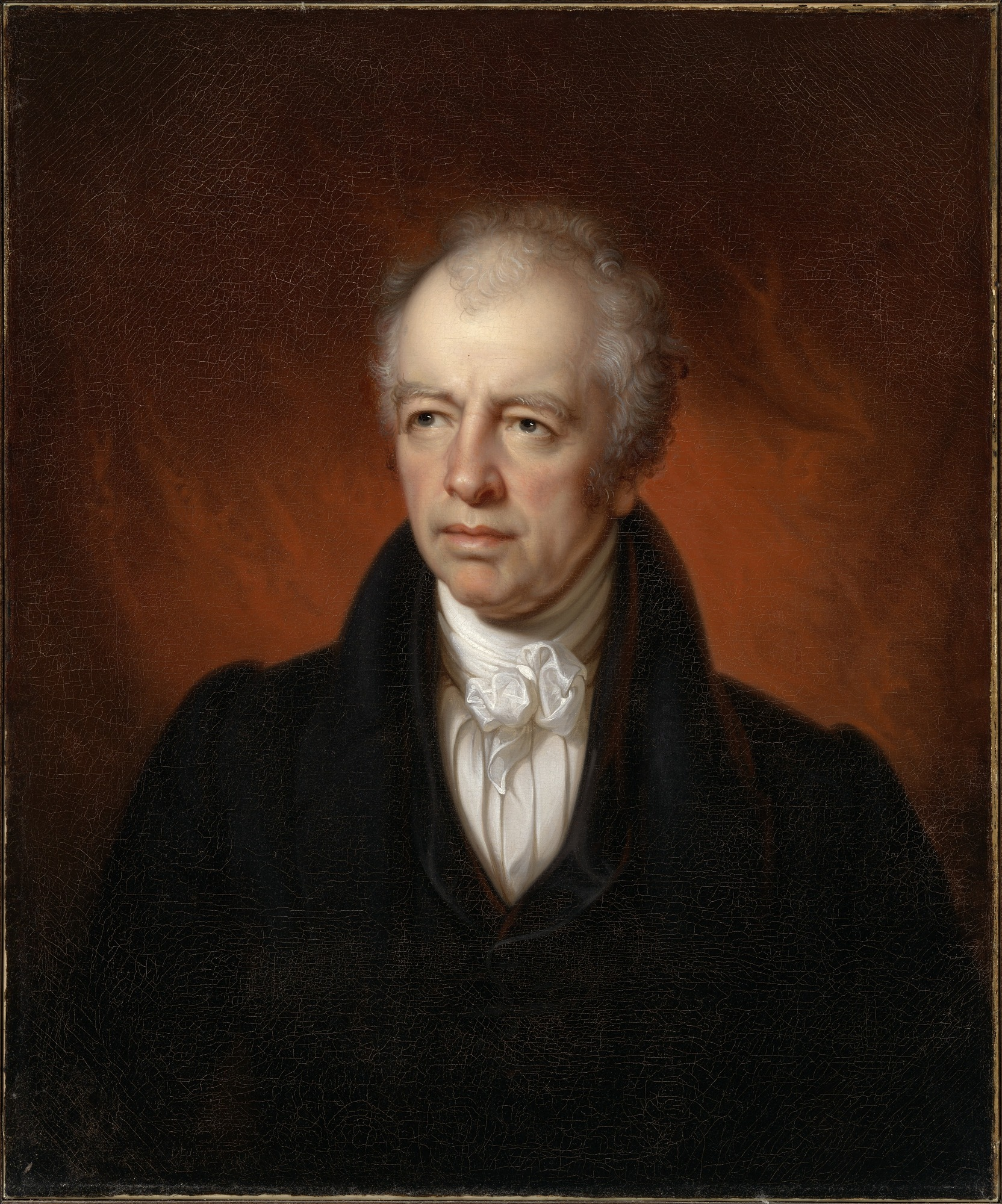
James Kent

The teaching of law at Columbia University reaches back to the 18th century. Graduates of the university's colonial predecessor, King's College, included such notable early American judicial figures as John Jay, who would become the first chief justice of the United States. Columbia College appointed its first professor of law, James Kent, in 1793. The lectures of Chancellor Kent in the course of four years had developed into the first two volumes of his Commentaries, the second volume being published November 1827. Kent did not, however, succeed in establishing a law school or department in the college. Thus, the formal instruction of law as a course of study did not commence until the middle of the 19th century.

=== Founding ===
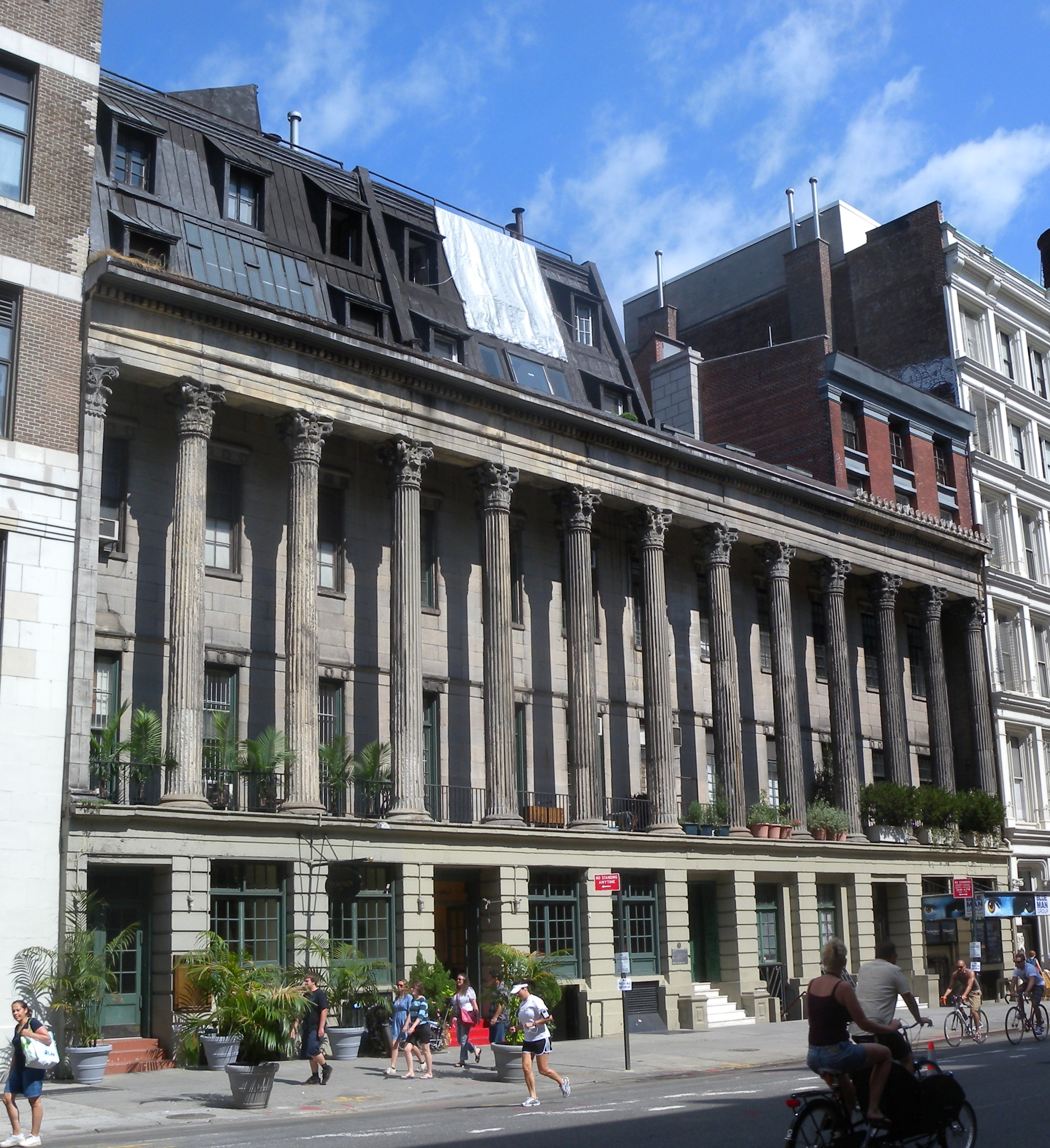
Columbia Law School's classes were originally held at Colonnade Row before moving to the Midtown campus.

The Columbia College Law School, as it was then officially called, was founded in 1858. Classes were originally held on Colonnade Row in a building once owned by John Jacob Astor. Approximately half of Colonnade Row still exists, but the portion occupied by Columbia Law School was demolished in 1902.

The first purpose-built law school building was a Gothic Revival structure located on Columbia's Madison Avenue campus, which also housed the college library. Thereafter, the college became Columbia University and moved north to the neighborhood of Morningside Heights. As Columbia Law Professor Theodore Dwight observed, at the founding of the formal course of study in law, the demand for it was still speculative:

It was considered at that time mainly as an experiment. No institution resembling a law school had ever existed in New York. Most of the leading lawyers had obtained their training in offices or by private reading, and were highly skeptical as to the possibility of securing competent legal knowledge by means of professional schools. Legal education was, however, at a very low ebb. The clerks in the law offices were left almost wholly to themselves. Frequently they were not even acquainted with the lawyers with whom, by a convenient fiction, they were supposed to be studying. Examinations for admission to the bar were held by committees appointed by the courts, who, where they inquired at all, sought for the most part to ascertain the knowledge of the candidate of petty details of practice. In general, the examinations were purely perfunctory. A politician of influence was not readily turned away. Few studied law as a science; many followed it as a trade or as a convenient ladder whereby to rise in a political career."

Indeed, Columbia Law School was one of the few law schools established in the United States before the Civil War. During the 18th and 19th centuries, most legal education took place in law offices, where young men, serving as apprentices or clerks, were set to copying documents and filling out legal forms under the supervision of an established attorney. In New York, John Jay, revolutionary Founding Father and first chief justice of the Supreme Court of the United States, read law with Benjamin Kissam, whose busy practice kept his clerks occupied in transcribing records, pleadings, and opinions. Jay was fortunate to have attentive supervision because the quality and time of learning the law varied greatly within the profession. Theodore Dwight, who had been head of the law department of Hamilton College in Clinton, New York, believed formal legal education, conducted in the classroom with regular lectures, was far superior to casual law office instruction.

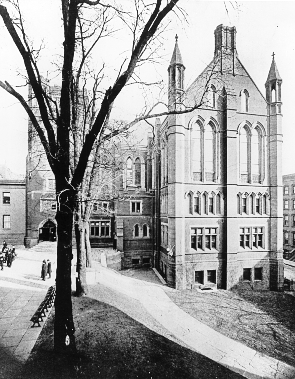
The Gothic Revival Law Library on Columbia's Madison Avenue Campus

At its founding, four distinct courses of lectures of this class were then established: one on Philology, offered by distinguished scholar and statesman, George P. Marsh; a second by Dr. Francis Lieber, a standard writer upon topics of political science and of international law, then a professor at Columbia College; a third course on Ethics, by Professor Nairne, also of the college; and a fourth on Municipal Law, by Theodore W. Dwight, then professor of Law in Hamilton College, New York, which at the time already had a flourishing law school. The original course of study to obtain a degree consisted of just two years, rather than the modern standard of three.

The first lecture in the law school was delivered on Monday, November 1, 1858, by Dwight, at the rooms of the Historical Society. It was an introductory lecture, afterwards printed. The audience consisted mainly of lawyers. It was plain that many of them could be counted upon as friends of a system of legal education. The result was an immediate attendance of 35 students, who showed their intention of pursuing a regular course of study by at once paying a tuition fee for instruction throughout the year. Such assurances were given of a future increase of numbers that it was determined to divide each class at the beginning of the coming year into two sections, for their convenience. The next year, the number of students was 62; in the third year, there were 103. Many of these early students were members of the bar.

In 1860, in order to stimulate excellence in attainments of the students, a series of annual prizes was established, commencing with $250, and diminishing regularly by $50, until the sum of $100 was reached. These were adjudicated by leading members of the bar upon the combined merits of written answers to printed questions, and of essays upon topics selected by the instructors. None could compete for the prizes except those who had fully completed the two years' course. The questions covered the range of studies for the whole course. Stringent rules were adopted in reference to the answers, so as to secure the absolute fidelity of the candidates in their work.

In 1882, George Henry Schanck graduated from Columbia Law as its first black student. There were a few other black students over the next several decades, including Thomas Ayres Church and James Dickson Carr.

=== Dwight Method ===
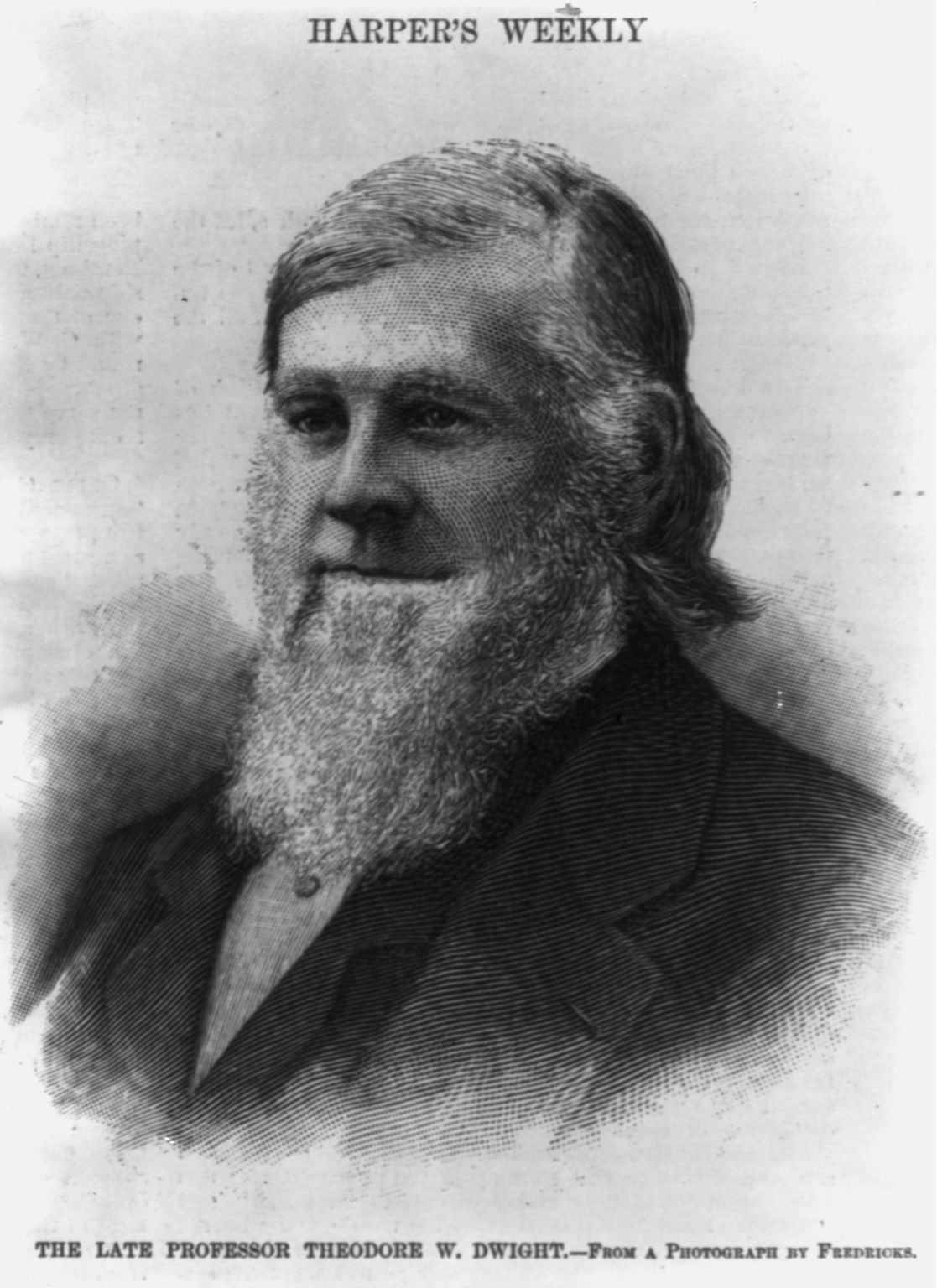
Theodore William Dwight

Professor Dwight believed a course of legal study should focus on the application of basic legal principles, as learned through the study of legal treatises, coupled with frequent moot courts which would permit students to demonstrate their proficiency in applying those principles to new legal problems. In this way, Dwight's method of teaching diverged significantly from the "case method" which had then been popularized by Dean Langdell of the Harvard Law School, which focused on the study of individual cases and the use of inductive reasoning to distill governing legal principles from those cases with little time spent on the practical application of those principles.

Dwight believed that his method was superior to the case method because it helped to create trained legal practitioners ready to enter the profession rather than academics more suited to teaching. In support of his position, Dwight cited the example of legal study throughout the Western World since the Roman empire:

It is not out of place in this connection to refer to the chosen methods of acquiring the Roman law, both as sanctioned by great jurists and by imperial authority, after an experience continuing through centuries . . . The Roman jurists had "cases" to deal with, precisely as we do. They were not mere legal philosophers, but disposed of practical and "burning" questions of their time. They were, however, in the habit of referring back to a legal principle in disposing of a concrete case, and believed that great principles could be so stated as to win the attention of students and give them a solid basis for future detailed acquisitions.

By the late 19th century, Dwight's method gave way to the case method which by the turn of the 20th century had become the standard curriculum at all of the other premier American law schools at Harvard, Yale and the University of Pennsylvania. In 1891, in response to Columbia's adoption of the case method, Dwight and a number of other professors left the law school to found New York Law School in Manhattan's Financial District.

=== 20th century ===
After Dwight's departure, William Albert Keener of Harvard Law School became dean of the law school from 1891 to 1901 when he was succeeded by George Washington Kirchwey. Future Supreme Court Justice Harlan Fiske Stone graduated from the law school in 1898. While practicing law in New York, he began lecturing at Columbia Law School in 1899 and joined the faculty as a full professor. He subsequently became dean of the law school in 1910 and held the position until 1923, when he left to join Sullivan and Cromwell as a partner. Stone became attorney general of the United States in 1924, and held that office for almost a year before joining the Supreme Court of the United States as an associate justice.

Columbia allowed women to enroll in 1927. In 1945, Elreta Alexander-Ralston became the first black woman to graduate from Columbia, followed the next year by Constance Baker Motley. Ruth Bader Ginsburg graduated in 1959, and became the first tenured law professor at Columbia in 1972, as well as the second woman ever on the U.S. Supreme Court.

In the 1920s and 30s, the law school soon became known for the development of the legal realism movement. Among the major realists affiliated with Columbia Law School were Karl Llewellyn, Felix S. Cohen and William O. Douglas.

In September 1988, Columbia Law School founded the first AIDS Law Clinic in the country, taught by Professor Deborah Greenberg and Mark Barnes.

== Academics ==
=== Centers ===
Columbia University was among the first schools to establish both comparative and international law centers, as well as an effective space law department. The law school also has major centers for the study of international law, including the Center for Chinese Legal Studies, the Center for Korean Legal Studies, the Center for Japanese Legal Studies, the European Legal Studies Center, the Sabin Center for Climate Change Law, the Center on Corporate Governance, the Center for Gender & Sexuality Law, the Center for Law and Economic Studies, the Center on Global Legal Transformation], as well as several other centers and law programs. In July 2012, the law school launched the Ira M. Millstein Center for Global Markets and Corporate Ownership to "study global financial markets and their diverse, interdependent actors"; the Center for Constitutional Governance to "bring together a dynamic roster of constitutional scholars who are deeply engaged in the study of governmental structure and relationships, including experts on separation of powers and issues of federalism"; and the Center for International Commercial and Investment Arbitration to "further the teaching and study of international arbitration, building on the Law School's considerable expertise in this rapidly growing area of legal practice."

=== Academic programs ===
==== Externships ====
On May 26, 2009, President Barack Obama nominated Judge Sonia Sotomayor, a lecturer-in-law since 1999, to be a justice of the Supreme Court of the United States. Judge Sotomayor created and co-taught a course entitled "The Federal Appellate Externship" every semester at the law school since the fall 2000. Federal Appellate Externships and many other externships, including Federal District Externships, are offered each year at Columbia Law.

Among other externships, the law school offers a full-semester externship on the federal government in Washington, D.C., which provides students hands-on experience in government law offices. In addition to their placements at federal agencies, students in the program are also required to attend a weekly seminar and write a substantive research paper. The Federal Government Externship has the following three specific components:

1. Field Placements: Students are required to work a minimum of 30 hours a week doing substantive legal work at a federal agency. Options include, amongst others, several sections of the Department of Justice, the Securities and Exchange Commission, the Environmental Protection Agency, the Federal Communications Commission, the Department of Health and Human Services, and the Department of Homeland Security,
2. Seminar: Students conduct an in-depth analysis of the roles lawyers play in federal offices. Each seminar is taught by Columbia Law faculty and a Washington-based adjunct professor. Each seminar also features guest speakers and has a substantive writing component.
3. Supervised Research: Students are required to produce an 8,000–10,000-word research paper on a topic closely connected to their externship and field placement. Externs are encouraged to consult with the agency in which they work to develop their topic.

==== Legal studies ====
Columbia offers a Graduate Legal Studies Program, including the Master of Laws (LL.M.) and the Doctor of the Science of Law (J.S.D.) degrees. The LL.M. Program is considered one of the best in the United States and has been ranked very highly according to private studies. Each year the law school enrolls approximately 210 graduate students from more than 50 countries with experience in all areas of the legal profession, including academia, the judiciary, public service, civil rights and human rights advocacy, non-governmental organizations, international organizations, and private practice. Graduate students are an important component of the law school community. They participate in many co-curricular activities, including student journals, moot courts, and student organizations. Graduate students also organize and speak at conferences, workshops, and colloquia on current legal issues.

==== Clinical programs ====
The law school runs several clinical programs that contribute to the community, including the nation's first technology-based clinic, called Lawyering in the Digital Age. This clinic is currently engaged in building a community resource to understand the collateral consequences of criminal charges. In April 2006, Columbia announced that it was starting the nation's first clinic in sexuality and gender law. The Sexuality and Gender Law Clinic "is the first law school clinic anywhere in the U.S. directed by a full-time law school faculty member and dedicated to legal and public policy issues related to gender and sexuality." In 2007, Columbia opened a new program in law and technology.

==== Joint degrees ====
===== Within the university =====
In December 2010, the law school announced the addition of an accelerated JD/MBA joint degree program, which allows students to obtain both a JD and MBA within three years. The accelerated program will not replace the existing four-year JD/MBA joint degree program. Interested students will be able to choose between the two programs. A joint degree can prove to be beneficial to law students' career objectives. To enable interested students to achieve this goal, the law school may approve a joint degree with any of the following of Columbia's graduate or professional schools:

- Graduate School of Arts and Sciences (Ph.D. in selected programs)
- School of Business
- School of International and Public Affairs (SIPA)
- Graduate School of Journalism
- School of the Arts
- School of Public Health
- School of Social Work
- School of Architecture, Planning and Preservation

===== Study abroad =====
Columbia has cultivated alliances and dual degree programs with overseas law schools, including the University of Oxford, King's College London, University College London, and the London School of Economics in London, England; the Institut d'études politiques de Paris ("Sciences Po") and the Université Panthéon-Sorbonne in Paris, France; the University of Amsterdam in the Netherlands; and the Institute for Law and Finance (ILF) at Goethe University Frankfurt in Frankfurt, Germany. The double degree options include JD/Master's in French Law (four-year program in Paris), JD/Masters Program in Global Business (three-year program in Paris), JD/LLM (three-year program in London), LLB/JD (four-year program in London), and JD/LLM (four-year program in Frankfurt).

Columbia Law School has one of the largest international alliances with China, and with Peking University, specifically, a joint exchange program that began in 2006, when students could be exchanged for a semester, which was expanded as a program in 2011 to allow faculty to teach or co-teach courses abroad, and which was expanded as a program again in 2013 when Columbia Law School dean David Schizer and Peking University Law School dean Zhang Shouwen signed a memorandum of understanding between the universities, allowing for joint publications and joint seminars between faculty at the respective universities.

=== Rankings ===
In 2026, Columbia Law School was ranked tied for 9th by U.S. News & World Report. In 2023, several top law schools, including Columbia Law, withdrew from the publication's rankings—meaning the schools would no longer provide data to the publication; prior to this, Columbia Law had been ranked in the top 5 (along with Harvard, Yale, and Stanford) since U.S. News & World Report's first began ranking law schools in 1987.

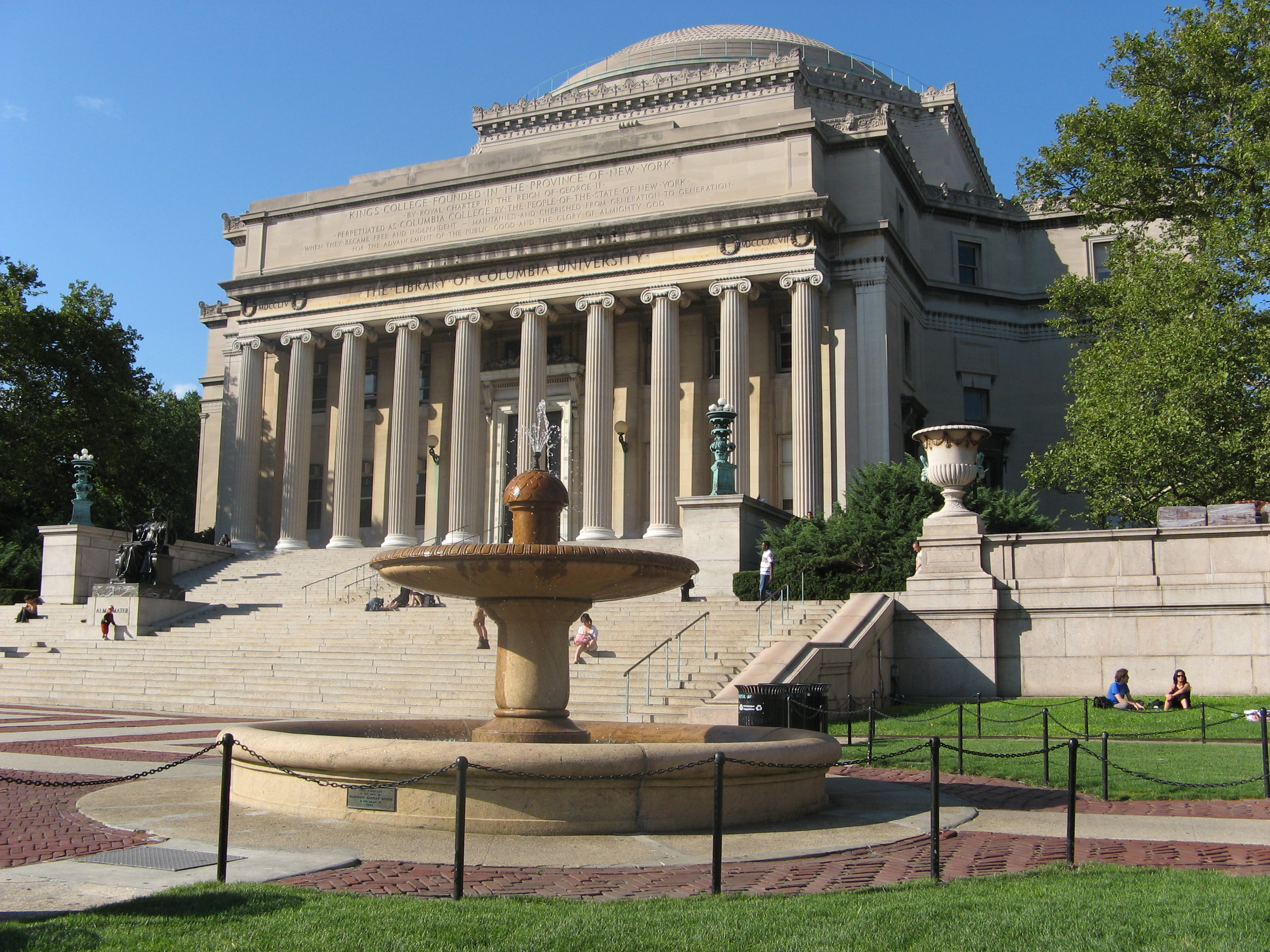
Low Memorial Library

For 2025, U.S. News & World Report ranks Columbia Law tied for 2nd for Business/Corporate Law and tied for 4th for Contracts/Commercial Law and tied for 37th in its Law Schools With the Most Graduates in Federal Clerkships.

According to Columbia Law School's 2021 ABA-required disclosures; 98.3 percent of the Class of 2021 obtained employment within ten months of graduation.

In 2023, the law school was ranked 2nd on the National Law Journal's "Go to Law Schools" ranking, which measures the percentage of graduates securing employment at the largest 100 law firms in the U.S.

In 2025, QS World University Rankings ranked it the 8th best law school in the world.

=== Facilities ===
Columbia Law School's main building, Jerome L. Greene Hall, was designed by Wallace Harrison and Max Abramovitz, architects of the United Nations Headquarters and Lincoln Center for the Performing Arts (which for many years served as the site of Columbia Law School's graduation ceremonies). It is located at the intersection of Amsterdam Avenue and West 116th Street. One of the building's defining features is its frontal sculpture, Bellerophon Taming Pegasus, designed by Jacques Lipchitz, symbolizing man's struggle over (his own) wild side/unreason.

In 1996, the law school was given an extensive renovation and expansion by Polshek Partnership (now Ennead Architects), including the addition of a new entrance façade and three story skylit lobby, as well as the expansion of existing space to include an upper-level students' commons, lounge areas, and a café. In the summer of 2008, construction of a new floor in Jerome Greene Hall was completed providing 38 new faculty offices. Other Columbia Law School buildings include William and June Warren Hall, the Jerome Greene Annex (which Jerome Greene's representatives politely declined to have renamed after the building of Jerome Greene Hall), and William C. Warren Hall (or "Little Warren").

Lenfest Hall, the law school's premier residence, opened in August 2003. The hall was named for H. F. Lenfest '58 and his wife Marguerite. Lenfest contains more than 200 luxury student residences, including private studio apartments and one-bedroom apartments. In addition to Lenfest Hall, the majority of Columbia Law students live in the university's Graduate Student Housing consisting of single and shared apartments in buildings throughout Morningside Heights. All Columbia Law students are guaranteed housing on campus for the duration of their law school studies.

The school reported in December 2020 that its Center for Chinese Legal Studies will be named for Hong Yen Chang, the school's first Chinese graduate in 1886, and the country's first Chinese American lawyer.

==== Li Lu Law Library ====
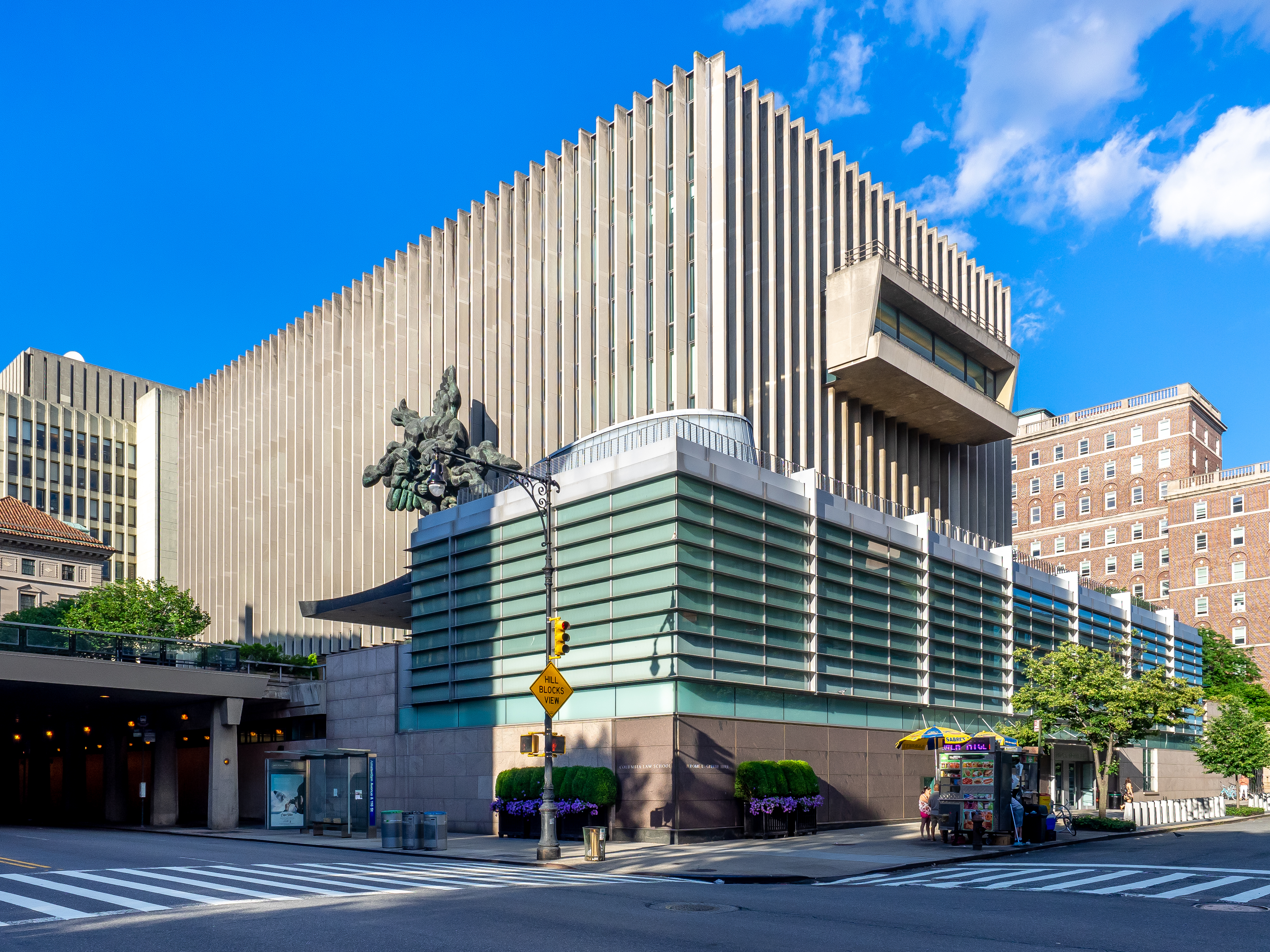
Jerome L. Greene Hall, home of the law school and the Li Lu Law Library, June 2019

Columbia Law School's Li Lu Law Library is one of the most comprehensive law libraries in the world.

== Student life ==
=== Student journals ===
The Columbia Law Review is the third-most-cited law journal in the world and is one of the four publishers of the Bluebook.

Columbia Law publishes thirteen other student-edited journals, including the Columbia Business Law Review, Columbia Human Rights Law Review (which in turn publishes A Jailhouse Lawyer's Manual), Columbia Journal of Asian Law, Columbia Journal of Environmental Law, Columbia Journal of European Law, Columbia Journal of Gender and Law, Columbia Journal of Law & the Arts, Columbia Journal of Law & Social Problems, Columbia Journal of Race & Law, Columbia Journal of Tax Law, Columbia Journal of Transnational Law, Columbia Science and Technology Law Review, and the American Review of International Arbitration.

=== Clerkships ===
Since 2005, 24 Columbia Law alumni have served as judicial clerks at the United States Supreme Court, one of the most distinguished appointments a law school graduate can obtain. This record gives Columbia a ranking of fifth among all law schools for supplying such law clerks for the period 2005–2017. Columbia has placed 135 clerks at the U.S. Supreme Court in its history, one of the top five law schools for clerks; this group includes Lee Bollinger, who clerked for Chief Justice Warren Burger in the 1972 Term, and who was formerly the president of Columbia University. In addition, Columbia Law alumni have clerked at the International Court of Justice.

== People ==
=== Faculty ===
Notable faculty of the school include:

- George Bermann
- Barbara Aronstein Black
- Vincent Blasi
- Philip Bobbitt
- Lee Bollinger
- Richard Briffault
- Sarah Cleveland
- Amal Clooney
- John C. Coffee Jr.
- Lori Damrosch
- Michael Doyle
- George P. Fletcher
- Katherine Franke
- Michael Gerrard
- Ronald Gilson
- Jane Ginsburg
- Kent Greenawalt
- Bernard Harcourt
- Olatunde C. Johnson
- Kathryn Judge
- Lina Khan
- Saritha Komatireddy
- Benjamin L. Liebman
- Debra Ann Livingston
- Gerard E. Lynch
- Thomas Merrill
- Gillian E. Metzger
- Joshua Mitts
- Eben Moglen
- Henry Monaghan
- Edward R. Morrison
- Jed S. Rakoff
- Charles Sabel
- William H. Simon
- Peter Strauss
- Eric Talley
- Kendall Thomas
- Christine A. Varney
- Donald Verrilli
- Kimberlé Williams Crenshaw
- Tim Wu
- Can Yeğinsu

=== Alumni ===
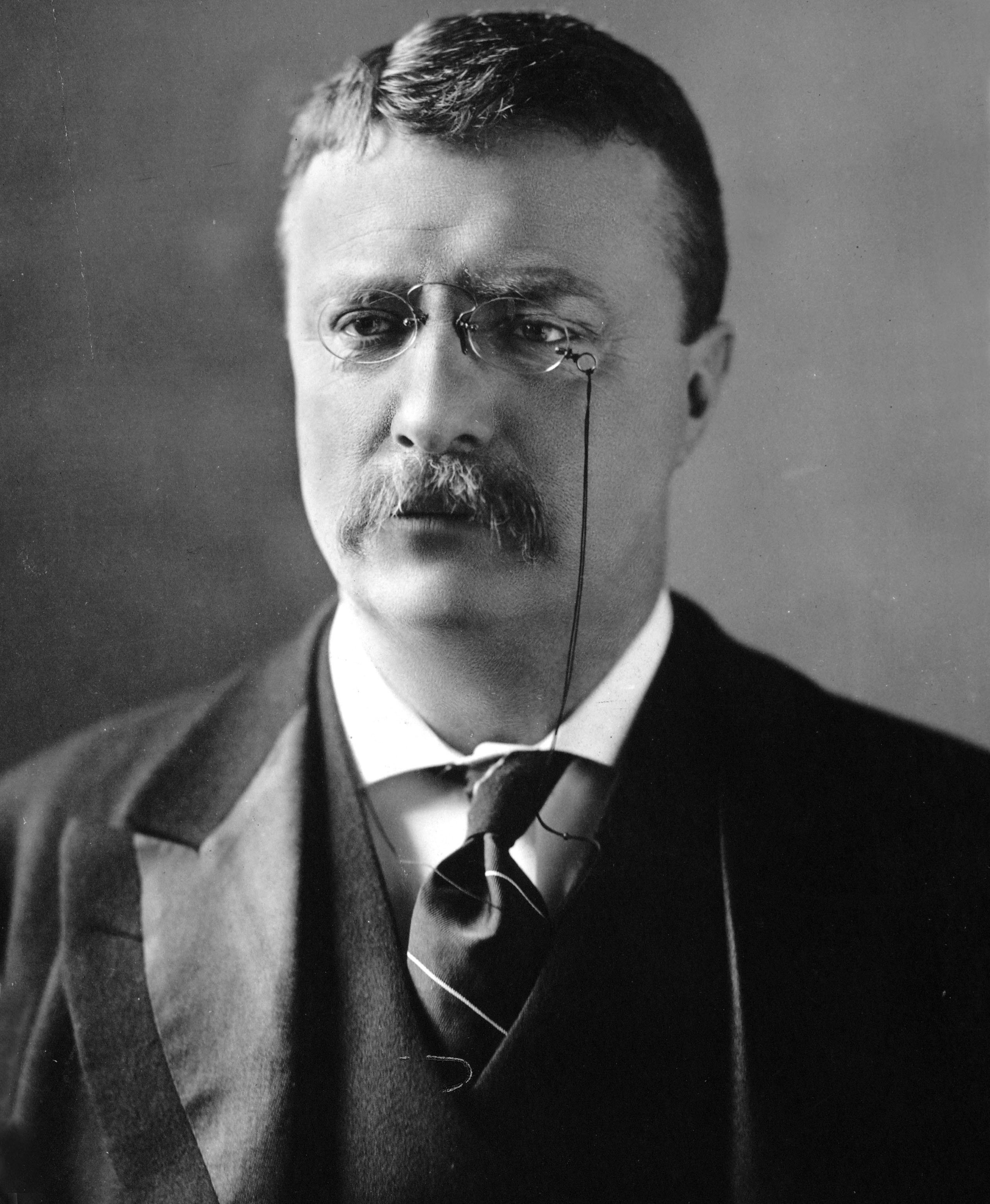
Theodore Roosevelt

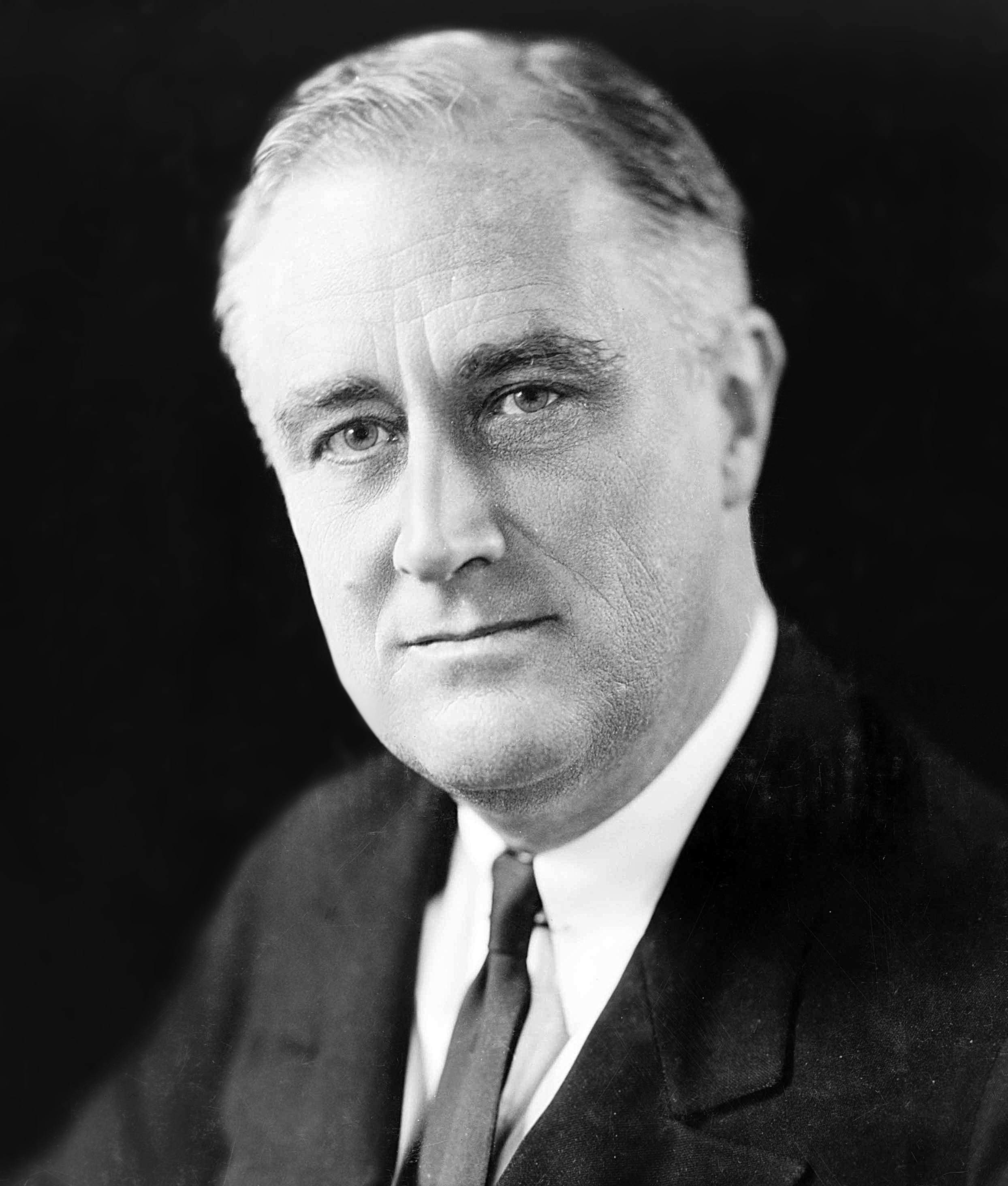
Franklin D. Roosevelt

Theodore Roosevelt, the 26th president of the United States and the 25th vice president of the United States, and Franklin D. Roosevelt, the 32nd president of the United States, were students at CLS; neither graduated from CLS, but they both received honorary J.D.s in October 2008. Former President of Georgia Mikheil Saakashvili received his LL.M. at Columbia; Giuliano Amato, twice former prime minister of Italy (1992–93 and 2000–2001), was also a CLS graduate. Graduates of the law school have served as members of the United States president's cabinet and non-U.S. government executive cabinets, including U.S. secretary of state, secretary of the treasury, secretary of war (now U.S. secretary of defense), and attorney general, among others.

Three of the school's graduates have served as chief justice of the United States: Charles Evans Hughes, Harlan Fiske Stone, and John Jay. Columbia Law School is the only law school to have graduated more than one chief justice. Ten alumni of Columbia Law School have served on the Supreme Court of the United States, including Justice Ruth Bader Ginsburg. Several alumni have served as United States Solicitor General. There are over 90 current and past members of the U.S. federal courts who have graduated from CLS.

Internationally, CLS graduates also have occupied prominent judicial positions, including Shi Jiuyong, former president of the International Court of Justice (ICJ); Xue Hanqin, current member of the ICJ; Giuliano Amato, current member of the Constitutional Court of Italy; Jan Schans Christensen ('88 LL.M.), current member of the Supreme Court of Denmark; Susan Denham, current chief justice, Supreme Court of Ireland; Marvic Leonen ('04 LL.M.), current member of the Supreme Court of the Philippines; Hironobu Takesaki, current chief justice of the Supreme Court of Japan; Umu Hawa Tejan-Jalloh, current chief justice, Supreme Court of Sierra Leone; Karin Maria Bruzelius, former member of the Supreme Court of Norway; Lawrence Collins, former justice of the Supreme Court of the United Kingdom; and Francis M. Ssekandi, former justice of the Supreme Court of Uganda.

In 2015, the positions of Attorney General (Eric Holder), Solicitor General (Don Verrilli), Secretary of Homeland Security (Jeh Johnson), and Assistant Attorney General for the Criminal Division (Lanny Breuer) were all occupied by graduates of the law school.

Notable legal academics who are graduates of CLS include Barbara Black, Lee Bollinger (who served as president of Columbia University, Felix S. Cohen, Lawrence Collins, Robert Cover, Samuel Estreicher, E. Allan Farnsworth, Charles Fried, Ruth Bader Ginsburg, Harvey Goldschmid, Kent Greenawalt, Jack Greenberg, Geoffrey C. Hazard Jr., Benjamin Kaplan, Jessica Litman, Louis Lusky, Yale Kamisar, Soia Mentschikoff, Gillian Metzger, Richard B. Morris, Paula Franzese, Robert Pitofsky, Barbara Ringer, Lawrence Sager, Michael I. Sovern, Arthur T. Vanderbilt, Charles Warren, Amy Wax, Herbert Wechsler, and Mark D. West.

CLS alumni are also notable in the arts, business, and elsewhere. For example, civil rights activist, recording artist, and actor Paul Robeson received his law degree from CLS in 1923. Academy Award-winning lyricist and playwright Oscar Hammerstein II attended the law school. Moe Berg was a Major League Baseball player, and a spy for the United States.

Entrepreneur and former 2020 presidential candidate Andrew Yang is also an alumnus.

== See also ==
- List of deans of Columbia Law School
