= Rutgers Law Review =

- Discipline: Law Review
- Language: English

Publication details
- History: 1948–2015
- Publisher: Rutgers School of Law (United States)
- Frequency: Quarterly

Standard abbreviations
- Bluebook: Rutgers L. Rev.
- ISO 4: Rutgers Law Rev.

Indexing
- ISSN: 0036-0465
- LCCN: 97660949
- OCLC no.: 55895560

Links
- Journal homepage

The Rutgers Law Review was a quarterly, scholarly journal focusing on legal issues, published by an organization of second- and third-year law students at the former Rutgers School of Law–Newark, in Newark, New Jersey. It was the flagship law review among the five accredited law journals at Rutgers School of Law–Newark. Among its notable alumni are Ronald Chen, acting dean of the law school and former public advocate for the State of New Jersey, and Senator Elizabeth Warren, former professor of law at Harvard Law School and chair of the Congressional Oversight Panel created to oversee the U.S. banking bailout, formally known as the Troubled Assets Relief Program.

In 2015, predating the merger of the two law schools at Rutgers, the Rutgers Law Review and the Rutgers Law Journal (the law review of the former Rutgers School of Law–Camden) merged into one law review, called the Rutgers University Law Review.

== Selection ==
Each year, the Rutgers Law Review held a write-on competition to select approximately 25 new members from a class of over 250 first year law students. Members were selected using a competitive process which took into account the applicant's first-year grades and performance on the write-on competition. The write-on competition required students to produce a high quality case comment using a packet of approximately two to three hundred pages of materials related to the case. The candidates had to complete all the requirements of the competition within 10 days.
