= Rutgers Law Journal =

- Discipline: Legal studies
- Language: English
- Edited by: R.J. Norcia

Publication details
- Former name: Rutgers Camden Law Journal
- History: 1969–2015
- Publisher: Rutgers School of Law–Camden (United States)
- Frequency: Quarterly

Standard abbreviations
- Bluebook: Rutgers L.J.
- ISO 4: Rutgers Law J.

Indexing
- ISSN: 0277-318X
- LCCN: 81642008
- OCLC no.: 56546784

Links
- Journal homepage

The Rutgers Law Journal was a quarterly, student-run law review published at the former Rutgers School of Law–Camden, in Camden, New Jersey. It was the flagship law review among the three accredited law journals at Rutgers School of Law–Camden.

In 2015, predating the merger of the two law schools at Rutgers, the Rutgers Law Journal and the Rutgers Law Review (the law review of the former Rutgers School of Law–Newark), merged into one law review, called the Rutgers University Law Review.

== History ==
The journal was established in 1969 as the Rutgers Camden Law Journal and obtained its current title in 1980. The Summer issue of the journal was dedicated to state constitutional law.

== Staff and selection of membership ==
The journal was published by second and third year law students and selects approximately 25 second-year law students for membership every year. This selection occurred through a case comment competition.

== Symposia ==
The Rutgers Law Journal hosted yearly symposia on a variety of contemporary legal issues.
