= Stroock =

Stroock is a surname. Notable people with the surname include:

- Daniel W. Stroock (1940–2025), American mathematician
- Geraldine Stroock (1925–1977), maiden name of Geraldine Brooks, American actress
- Gloria Stroock (1924–2024), American actress
- Moses J. Stroock (1866–1931), American lawyer
- Sol M. Stroock (1873–1941), American lawyer
- Thomas F. Stroock (1925–2009), American businessman, ambassador, and politician from Wyoming

== See also ==
- Stroock & Stroock & Lavan LLP, American law firm based in New York City
- Strack
- Strick
- Struck
- Sturrock
