= Center for Copyright Information =

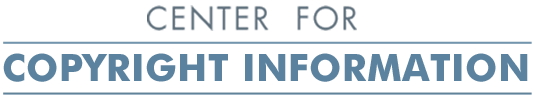
- Abbreviation: CCI
- Members: Motion Picture Association of America (MPAA); Recording Industry Association of America (RIAA); Independent Film & Television Alliance (IFTA); American Association of Independent Music (A2IM); AT&T; Cablevision; Comcast; Time Warner Cable; Verizon
- Executive Director: Jill Lesser
- Executive Board: Thomas Dailey (Chairman); Steven Marks (Executive Vice President); Marianne Grant; Alan Lewine; Daniel M. Mandil; Brent Olson
- Advisory Board: Jerry Berman; Jules Polonetsky; Leslie Harris

The Center for Copyright Information (CCI) is an American organization focused on advocacy and initiatives in support of copyright law. The CCI aims to educate the public about copyright law; coordinates with copyright owners and Internet service providers (ISPs) about issues related to online copyright infringement; assists with the design, implementation, review, and promotion of an online infringement notification and mitigation system (the Copyright Alert System); collects and disseminates online infringement data; and promotes lawful means of obtaining copyrighted works. The organization was created as a partnership between industry associations, including the Motion Picture Association of America, the Recording Industry Association of America, and five major American Internet service providers.

== Background ==
The Center for Copyright Information was formed in September 2011 to coordinate efforts between the television, film and music industries and service providers to curb online copyright infringement and educate Internet subscribers about the issue. The RIAA began negotiations to create the Center for Copyright Information and its Copyright Alert System in December 2008, after it ceased a five-year litigation campaign against individual file sharers. Between 2003 and 2008, the RIAA adopted a practice of suing individual file sharers; previously it had focused on efforts to shut down peer-to-peer file sharing services.

The MPAA and RIAA, along with the Independent Film & Television Alliance and American Association of Independent Music, as associations representing independent producers in their fields, reached an agreement in July 2011 with five large ISPs to create the Copyright Alerts System. The trade groups argued copyright infringement was costing the U.S. economy hundreds of thousands of jobs and billions of dollars in lost earnings and tax revenue annually. New York Governor Andrew Cuomo helped bring parties to the table as part of his 2008 work with Internet service providers to block access to online child pornography. Under the July 2011 agreement, several U.S. Internet service providers, including Verizon Communications, Comcast, Time Warner Cable, Cablevision Systems and AT&T agreed to send alerts to customers who appeared to be using their accounts for illegal downloading. At the time of the agreement 75% of all broadband internet usage was provided by one of these five companies. The Memorandum of Understanding established that copyright holders and ISP's would split the costs of the system 50/50. According to the CCI's first tax filing, chronicling the first 8 months of the companies operations, CSA operation costs were $1,377,633.00. In July 2011, the Obama administration praised the formation of the CCI on the official White House Blog as "a positive step” and consistent with the executive branch's strategy of encouraging voluntary intellectual property enforcement. In 2011, the CCI had its corporate status revoked according to the Columbia Department of Consumer and Regulatory Affairs for failing to file the proper paperwork, which they quickly resolved. In 2013, the CCI announced it would be supporting iKeepSafe's pilot program. iKeepSafe, is an independently created curriculum designed to educate children about copyright law and fair use in the digital age.

=== Leadership and advisors ===
CCI is led by an executive committee, with Executive Director Jill Lesser as its head. Lesser was previously the senior vice president of domestic public policy for AOL, as well as the deputy director of public policy at People for the American Way.

In addition, the CCI has an advisory board which "consults actively on issues the Executive Committee is considering." The CCI's original advisory board includes consumer advocates Jerry Berman, founder of the Center for Democracy and Technology; Gigi Sohn, president and CEO of Public Knowledge; and Jules Polonetsky, director and co-chair of the Future of Privacy Forum. Leslie Harris, former president of the Center of Democracy and Technology replaced Gigi Sohn when she was asked by the chairman of Federal Communication's Commission, Tom Wheeler, to run the FCC's External Affairs branch.

== Copyright Alert System ==
The Copyright Alert System uses third parties to identify when copyrighted information is shared via peer-to-peer services. These third parties inform Internet service providers, which then send an alert to the relevant customer. The Copyright Alert System was launched in February 2013 by the Center for Copyright Information. The CCI has stated that the primary goal of the system is "to make consumers aware of activity that has occurred using their Internet accounts, educate them on how they can prevent such activity from happening again, and provide information about the growing number of ways to access digital content legally."

== See also ==
- Copy protection
