= New York's 46th State Assembly district =

American legislative district

Assemblymember
Alec Brook-Krasny; R–Coney Island

New York's 46th State Assembly district is one of 150 districts of the New York State Assembly. It is currently represented by Republican Alec Brook-Krasny since 2023, defeating Mathylde Frontus. He previously represented the district as a Democrat between 2006 and 2015.

== Geography ==
=== 2010s-present ===
District 46 is located in Brooklyn. It contains Coney Island and Sea Gate, as well as parts of Bath Beach, Bay Ridge, Brighton Beach, Dyker Heights and Gravesend. Fort Hamilton, Calvert Vaux Park, Luna Park, the Wonder Wheel, the New York Aquarium and the Dyker Beach Park and Golf Course are within this district.

The district overlaps (partially) with New York's 8th and 11th congressional districts, the 17th, 23rd and 26th districts of the New York State Senate, and the 38th, 47th, 48th and 50th districts of the New York City Council.

== Recent election results ==
=== 2026 ===
2026 New York State Assembly election, District 46
Primary election
Party	Candidate	Votes	%
Democratic	Chris McCreight	3,317	64.1
Democratic	Joseph Santangelo	1,845	35.7
Write-in		13	0.2
Total votes		5,175	100.0
General election
Republican	Alec Brook-Krasny		
Conservative	Alec Brook-Krasny		
Total	Alec Brook-Krasny (incumbent)		
Democratic	Chris McCreight		
Working Families	Chris McCreight		
Affordable & Safe	Chris McCreight		
Total	Chris McCreight		
Write-in			
Total votes			100.0

=== 2024 ===
2024 New York State Assembly election, District 46
Party	Candidate	Votes	%
Republican	Alec Brook-Krasny	19,099	
Conservative	Alec Brook-Krasny	1,932	
Total	Alec Brook-Krasny (incumbent)	21,031	51.6
Democratic	Chris McCreight	19,540	48.0
Write-in		160	0.4
Total votes		40,731	100.0
Republican hold			

=== 2022 ===
2022 New York State Assembly election, District 46
Primary election
Party	Candidate	Votes	%
Democratic	Mathylde Frontus (incumbent)	3,677	65.3
Democratic	Dionne Brown-Jordan	1,936	34.4
Write-in		16	0.3
Total votes		5,629	100.0
General election
Republican	Alec Brook-Krasny	14,310	
Conservative	Alec Brook-Krasny	1,054	
Total	Alec Brook-Krasny	15,364	51.9
Democratic	Mathylde Frontus	12,757	
Working Families	Mathylde Frontus	1,426	
Total	Mathylde Frontus (incumbent)	14,183	47.9
Write-in		37	0.1
Total votes		29,584	100.0
Republican gain from Democratic			

=== 2020 ===
2020 New York State Assembly election, District 46
Party	Candidate	Votes	%
Democratic	Mathylde Frontus (incumbent)	21,993	50.9
Republican	Mark Szuszkiewicz	19,537	
Conservative	Mark Szuszkiewicz	1,618	
Total	Mark Szuszkiewicz	21,155	49.0
Write-in		53	0.1
Total votes		43,201	100.0
Democratic hold			

=== 2018 ===
2018 New York State Assembly election, District 46
Primary election
Party	Candidate	Votes	%
Democratic	Mathylde Frontus (incumbent)	3,792	50.2
Democratic	Ethan Lustig-Elgrably	3,741	49.5
Write-in		26	0.3
Total votes		7,559	100
Women's Equality	Mathylde Frontus (write-in)	6	100
Women's Equality	Ethan Lustig-Elgrably	0	
Write-in		0	0.0
Total votes		6	100
General election
Democratic	Mathylde Frontus	15,537	
Women's Equality	Mathylde Frontus	188	
Total	Mathylde Frontus (incumbent)	15,725	53.6
Republican	Steven Saperstein	11,567	
Conservative	Steven Saperstein	883	
Independence	Steven Saperstein	296	
Reform	Steven Saperstein	67	
Total	Steven Saperstein	12,813	43.7
Working Families	Ethan Lustig-Elgrably	464	1.6
Green	Patrick Dwyer	310	1.1
Write-in		19	0.0
Total votes		29,331	100
Democratic hold			

=== 2016 ===
2016 New York State Assembly election, District 46
Primary election
Party	Candidate	Votes	%
Democratic	Pamela Harris (incumbent)	3,234	61.2
Democratic	Katie Cucco	2,040	38.6
Write-in		12	0.2
Total votes		5,286	100
Conservative	Mikhail Usher	56	83.6
Conservative	Lucretia Regina-Potter	10	14.9
Write-in		1	1.5
Total votes		67	100
Reform	Lucretia Regina-Potter	2	66.6
Write-in		1	33.3
Total votes		3	100
General election
Democratic	Pamela Harris (incumbent)	20,061	57.5
Republican	Lucretia Regina-Potter	11,463	
Reform	Lucretia Regina-Potter	344	
Total	Lucretia Regina-Potter	11,807	33.9
Conservative	Mikhail Usher	1,699	4.9
Green	Patrick Dwyer	1,252	3.6
Write-in		45	0.1
Total votes		34,864	100
Democratic hold			

=== 2015 special ===
Incumbent Alec Brook-Krasny resigned his seat on July 7, 2015 to work in the private sector, triggering a special election. In special elections for state legislative offices, primaries are usually not held – county committee members and district leaders for each party select nominees. Election was held on November 3rd, 2015.

2015 New York State Assembly special election, District 46
Party	Candidate	Votes	%
Democratic	Pamela Harris	4,302	
Working Families	Pamela Harris	293	
Total	Pamela Harris	4,595	58.6
Republican	Lucretia Regina-Potter	1,988	
Conservative	Lucretia Regina-Potter	570	
Independence	Lucretia Regina-Potter	113	
People's Choice	Lucretia Regina-Potter	36	
Total	Lucretia Regina-Potter	2,707	36.9
Write-in		40	0.5
Total votes		7,342	100.0
Democratic hold			

=== 2014 ===
2014 New York State Assembly election, District 46
Primary election
Party	Candidate	Votes	%
Republican	Stamatis Lilikakis	636	58.6
Republican	Lucretia Regina-Potter	433	39.9
Write-in		16	1.5
Total votes		1,085	100
Independence	Alec Brook-Krasny (incumbent)	44	60.3
Independence	Stamatis Lilikakis (write-in)	19	26.0
Write-in		10	13.7
Total votes		73	100
General election
Democratic	Alec Brook-Krasny	7,861	
Working Families	Alec Brook-Krasny	767	
Independence	Alec Brook-Krasny	373	
Total	Alec Brook-Krasny (incumbent)	9,001	58.1
Republican	Stamatis Lilikakis	5,149	
Conservative	Stamatis Lilikakis	1,271	
Total	Stamatis Lilikakis	6,420	41.4
Write-in		68	0.5
Total votes		15,489	100
Democratic hold			

=== 2012 ===
2012 New York State Assembly election, District 46
Primary election
Party	Candidate	Votes	%
Republican	Thomas McCarthy	890	70.5
Republican	Lucretia Regina-Potter	367	29.1
Write-in		5	0.4
Total votes		1,262	100
General election
Democratic	Alec Brook-Krasny	15,194	
Working Families	Alec Brook-Krasny	822	
Total	Alec Brook-Krasny (incumbent)	16,016	61.2
Republican	Thomas McCarthy	8,507	
Conservative	Thomas McCarthy	1,173	
Total	Thomas McCarthy	9,680	37.0
Green	Patrick Dwyer	440	1.7
Write-in		16	0.1
Total votes		26,152	100
Democratic win (new boundaries)			

=== 2010 ===
2010 New York State Assembly election, District 46
Party	Candidate	Votes	%
Democratic	Alec Brook-Krasny	10,525	
Independence	Alec Brook-Krasny	887	
Working Families	Alec Brook-Krasny	639	
Total	Alec Brook-Krasny (incumbent)	12,051	85.1
Conservative	Jerry Amalfitano	2,097	14.8
Write-in		9	0.1
Total votes		14,157	100.0
Democratic hold			

=== 2008 ===
2008 New York State Assembly election, District 46
Party	Candidate	Votes	%
Democratic	Alec Brook-Krasny	18,402	
Working Families	Alec Brook-Krasny	891	
Total	Alec Brook-Krasny (incumbent)	19,293	70.0
Republican	Robert Capano	7,066	
Conservative	Robert Capano	684	
Independence	Robert Capano	500	
Total	Robert Capano	8,250	30.0
Write-in		0	0.0
Total votes		27,543	100.0
Democratic hold			

=== 2006 ===
2006 New York State Assembly election, District 46
Primary election
Party	Candidate	Votes	%
Democratic	Alec Brook-Krasny	3,101	51.2
Democratic	Ari Kagan	2,958	48.8
Write-in		1	0.0
Total votes		6,060	100.0
General election
Democratic	Alec Brook-Krasny	10,423	
Working Families	Alec Brook-Krasny	706	
Total	Alec Brook-Krasny	11,129	70.1
Republican	Patricia Laudano	4,139	
Conservative	Patricia Laudano	599	
Total	Patricia Laudano	4,738	29.9
Write-in		4	0.0
Total votes		15,871	100.0
Democratic hold			

=== 2004 ===
2004 New York State Assembly election, District 46
Primary election
Party	Candidate	Votes	%
Democratic	Adele Cohen (incumbent)	3,071	59.7
Democratic	Inna Kaminsky	2,069	40.3
Write-in		0	0.0
Total votes		5,140	100.0
General election
Democratic	Adele Cohen	15,706	
Working Families	Adele Cohen	773	
Total	Adele Cohen (incumbent)	16,479	60.6
Republican	Alexander Kaplan	9,843	
Conservative	Alexander Kaplan	879	
Total	Alexander Kaplan	10,722	39.4
Write-in		0	0.0
Total votes		27,201	100.0
Democratic hold			

=== 2002 ===
2002 New York State Assembly election, District 46
Primary election
Party	Candidate	Votes	%
Democratic	Adele Cohen (incumbent)	3,503	51.7
Democratic	Susan Lasher	3,274	48.3
Write-in		0	0.0
Total votes		6,777	100.0
General election
Democratic	Adele Cohen	8,584	
Working Families	Adele Cohen	383	
Total	Adele Cohen (incumbent)	8,967	88.9
Conservative	Mark Franco Belli	1,124	11.1
Write-in		1	0.0
Total votes		10,092	100.0
Democratic hold			

=== 2000 ===
2000 New York State Assembly election, District 46
Party	Candidate	Votes	%
Democratic	Adele Cohen	15,265	
Working Families	Adele Cohen	465	
Total	Adele Cohen (incumbent)	15,730	85.4
Conservative	Mark Belli	1,186	6.4
Write-in		1,495	8.1
Total votes		18,411	100.0

=== Federal results in Assembly District 46 ===
Year	Office	Results
2024	President	Trump 53.5 – 44.2%
2024	Senate	Sapraicone 50.0 - 48.7%
2022	Senate	Pinion 50.7 – 49.3%
2020	President	Biden 50.1 – 48.6%
2018	Senate	Gillibrand 61.2 – 38.8%
2016	President	Clinton 52.3 – 45.0%
2016	Senate	Schumer 70.2 – 29.7%
2012	President	Obama 57.4 – 41.5%
2012	Senate	Gillibrand 67.6 – 30.9%

== Past assemblymembers ==
- Mathylde Frontus (2018–2022)
- Pamela Harris (2015–2018)
- Alec Brook-Krasny (2006–2015)
- Adele Cohen (1998–2006)
- Jules Polonetsky (1994–1997)
- Howard L. Lasher (1973–1994)
- Leonard Simon (1967–1973)
- Bertram Baker (1948–1964)
