= Shurrock =

Shurrock is a surname. Notable people with the surname include:

- Ann Shurrock (born 1946), New Zealand archer
- Francis Shurrock (1887–1977), New Zealand sculptor and art teacher

== See also ==
- Sturrock
