= Mathylde Frontus =

American politician

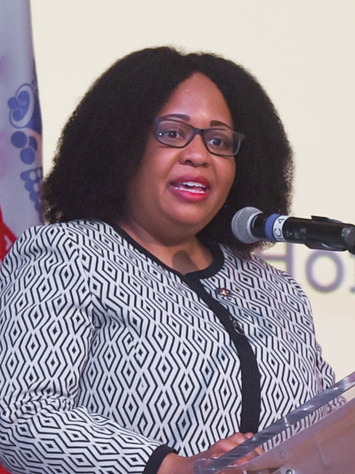
- Frontus in 2021

Member of the New York State Assembly from the 46th district
- In office November 15, 2018 – December 31, 2022
- Preceded by: Pamela Harris
- Succeeded by: Alec Brook-Krasny

Personal details
- Born: December 1, 1977 (age 48) Brooklyn, New York
- Party: Democratic
- Website: Assembly website

Mathylde Frontus (born December 1, 1977) is an American politician. A Democrat, Frontus represented the 46th district in the New York State Assembly. Her district includes portions of southern Brooklyn, including Coney Island, Brighton Beach, Bay Ridge, and Dyker Heights.

As of 2023, Frontus remains the only person since Adele Cohen, who retired in 2006, to have represented the 46th State Assembly District and not have faced criminal charges.

== Early life and education ==
Born December 1, 1977 in Brooklyn, Frontus is the daughter of Haitian immigrants. Frontus is a graduate of New York University, Teachers College, Columbia University, and Harvard Divinity School.

== Career ==
Prior to holding elected office, Frontus was well known as a community organizer in southwestern Brooklyn, and notably founded the Urban Neighborhood Services. She received the Characters Unite Award from NBCUniversal for her work in 2014.

=== New York State Assembly ===
In 2018, Assembly member Pamela Harris resigned her seat after allegations of fraud led to an 11-count indictment. Soon afterward, Frontus announced her candidacy for the open seat, and then won the Democratic primary election over Ethan Lustig-Elgrably by only 51 votes. In the general election, Frontus defeated Republican Steven Saperstein with 56% of the vote.

In March 2020, Frontus fired a member of her staff, Marilyn Franks, a receptionist in Frontus’ Coney Island district office, after Franks shared a message on Facebook that urged patrons to avoid Chinese restaurants and businesses during the COVID-19 pandemic. Frontus was reelected in the November 2020 election. In November 2022, Frontus lost reelection to Alec Brook-Krasny by 806 votes.
