= 1997 New York City Comptroller election =

- November 4, 1997

Candidate	Alan Hevesi	Annemarie McAvoy
Party	Democratic	Republican
Alliance	Liberal
Popular vote	866,572	227,341
Percentage	76.30%	20.02%
- Results by State Assembly district Hevesi: 50–60% 60–70% 70–80% 80–90% >90%
Comptroller before election
Alan Hevesi
Democratic
Elected Comptroller
Alan Hevesi
Democratic

The 1997 New York City Comptroller election took place on November 4, 1997, to elect the comptroller of New York City. The election was held concurrently with the races for mayor and public advocate.

The incumbent comptroller, Alan Hevesi, a Democrat first elected in 1993, won re-election with 76% of the vote.

== Background ==
Hevesi was favored to win re-election. His main opponent was Annemarie McAvoy, a Republican who entered the race too late to join the city's campaign finance program; the other candidates were Independence nominee Genevieve Torres, Right to Life nominee Donald Young, Fusion nominee Donal Yarbrough and Socialist Workers nominee Wendy Lyons.

Hevesi raised $1,959,275 for the campaign and spent $2,053,787. He received $247,054 in public matching funds, but announced at a Campaign Finance Board debate on October 27 that he would return some of the money because McAvoy had not launched a "$3-million attack." He ultimately returned $172,600.

Two general election debates were held. The first, on September 29, included Hevesi, Torres and Lyons, the candidates participating in the campaign finance program. McAvoy and Hevesi, the only candidates to qualify as "leading contenders," met in a second debate on October 27.

== Democratic primary ==
Hevesi was the only Democratic candidate for comptroller, and no Democratic primary for the office was held. The Campaign Finance Board's list of 1997 primary results includes no comptroller race.

== General election ==
Hevesi won with 76.30% of the vote.

Candidate	Party/Line	Votes	% of candidate votes
Alan Hevesi (incumbent)	Democratic + Liberal	866,572	76.30%
Annemarie McAvoy	Republican	227,341	20.02%
Genevieve Torres	Independence	19,837	1.75%
Donald Young	Right to Life	14,923	1.31%
Wendy Lyons	Socialist Workers	5,525	0.49%
Donal Yarbrough	Fusion	1,546	0.14%
Total		1,135,744	100.00%

== Aftermath ==
Hevesi was sworn in for a second term on January 1, 1998. He was term-limited in 2001 and ran unsuccessfully for mayor that year, finishing fourth in the Democratic primary. He was elected New York State Comptroller in 2002. Bill Thompson won the open city comptroller seat in 2001.
