= 1997 New York City Public Advocate election =

- November 4, 1997
Candidate	Mark Green	Jules Polonetsky
Party	Democratic	Republican
Popular vote	871,305	285,495
Percentage	73.8%	24.2%
Public Advocate before election
Mark Green
Democratic
Elected Public Advocate
Mark Green
Democratic

The 1997 New York City Public Advocate election took place on Tuesday, November 4, 1997, along with elections for mayor, the city comptroller, borough presidents, and members of the New York City Council. The Democratic incumbent, Mark Green, won reelection with 74% of the vote against 24% for the Republican and Liberal nominee, Jules Polonetsky.

The public advocate has the formal role of presiding over meetings of the New York City Council (although the Speaker elected by the council itself now does much of this work), and, until the next election, would serve as acting mayor whenever the elected mayor is unable to serve.

== Candidates ==
=== Democratic party ===
Green, the first person to hold the office, was elected in 1993 and sought a second term. In the September 1997 Democratic primary he faced Brooklyn Assembly member Roger Green, who remained on the ballot but had stopped campaigning weeks before the primary; Mark Green won easily. While running for reelection, Green was also preparing a 1998 campaign for the United States Senate.

=== Republican and Liberal parties ===
Jules Polonetsky, a Democratic Brooklyn Assembly member, ran on the Republican and Liberal lines. He announced that he would run on a joint ticket with Mayor Rudy Giuliani, who was seeking reelection on the same lines. Polonetsky was later named Commissioner of the New York City Department of Consumer Affairs by Giuliani.

=== Other parties ===
- Shoghi Fret, Socialist Workers Party
- Daniel J. Buckley, Right to Life Party
- Ismael Betancourt Jr., Fusion

== Campaign ==
Throughout the campaign, Green was considered the favorite. Green and Polonetsky both participated in the New York City Campaign Finance Board's public-funds program, as did Fret. Green received about $385,000 in public funds; Polonetsky had not reached the threshold to receive public funds by Election Day. Green, Polonetsky and Fret took part in one general election debate; no "leading contenders" debate was held for the office because only Green reached the 15% polling threshold.

== Results ==
=== Democratic primary ===
Tuesday, September 9, 1997

Mark Green defeated Roger Green to win the Democratic nomination.

1997 Democratic primary	Votes	%
Mark Green (incumbent)	238,039	80.2%
Roger Green	58,682	19.8%
T O T A L	296,721	

=== General election ===
Tuesday, November 4, 1997

1997 general election	Party	Votes	%
Mark Green (incumbent)	Democratic	871,305	73.8%
Jules Polonetsky	Republican, Liberal	285,495	24.2%
Daniel Buckley	Right to Life	18,195	1.5%
Shoghi Fret	Socialist Workers	2,961	0.3%
Ismael Betancourt Jr.	Fusion	2,929	0.2%
Total votes		1,180,885	

Source: Campaign Finance Board, with vote totals as provided by the Board of Elections in the City of New York

Mark Green was reelected public advocate.

== See also ==
- New York City Public Advocate
- Government of New York City
- 1997 New York City mayoral election
- 1997 New York City Comptroller election
