= Alec Brook-Krasny =

American politician

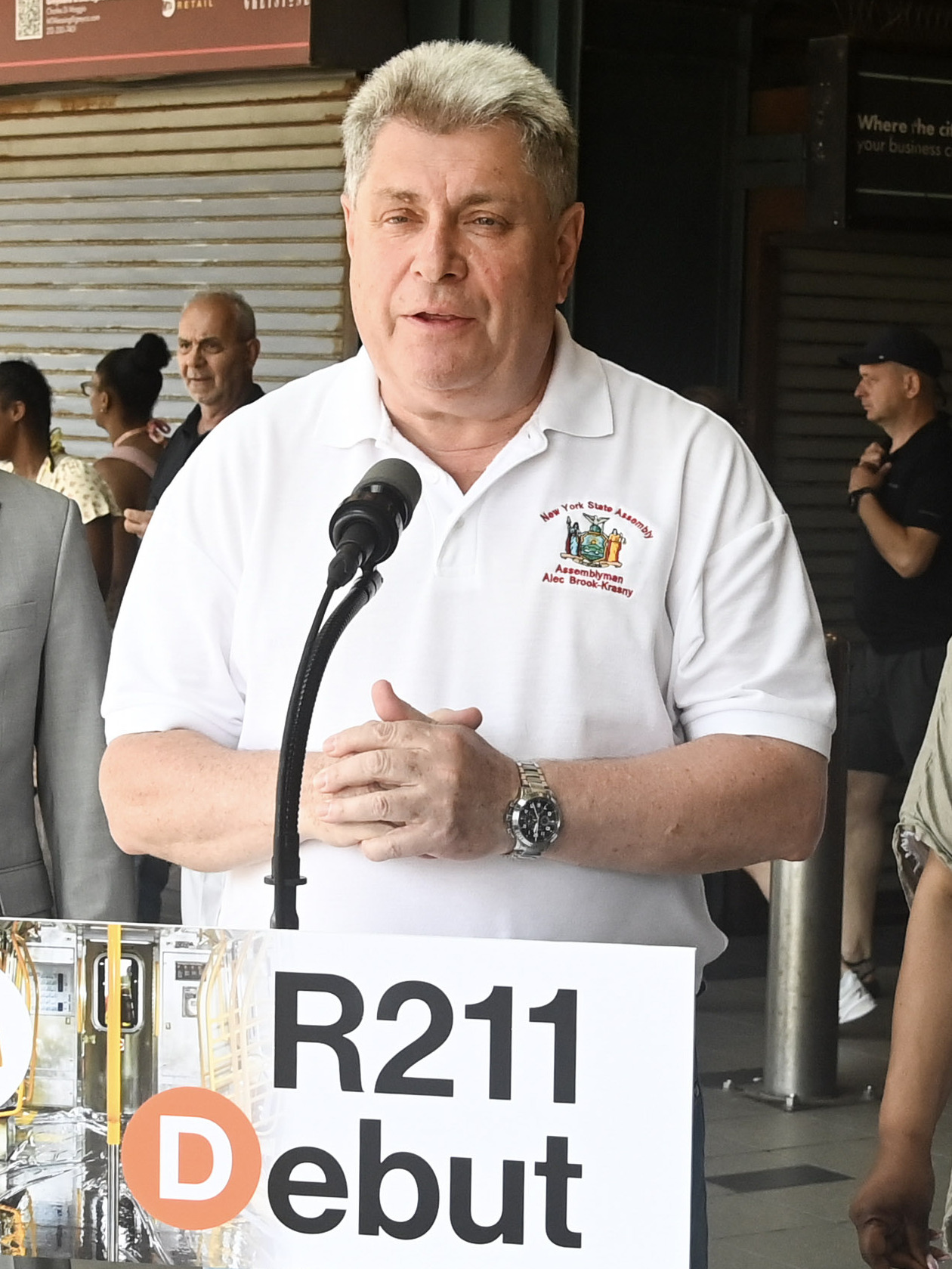

Member of the New York State Assembly from the 46th district
- Incumbent
- Assumed office January 1, 2023
- Preceded by: Mathylde Frontus
- In office November 7, 2006 – July 7, 2015
- Preceded by: Adele Cohen
- Succeeded by: Pamela Harris

Personal details
- Born: March 2, 1958 (age 68) Moscow, Russian SFSR, Soviet Union (now Russia)
- Party: Republican (2022–present); Democratic (before 2022)
- Education: Russian State University of Tourism and Services Studies (BA)
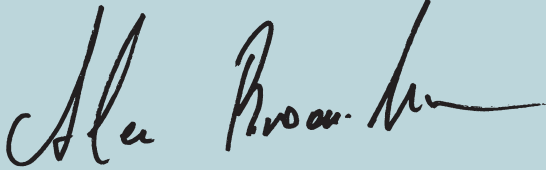
- Signature
- Website: State Assembly website

Alec Brook-Krasny (born March 2, 1958) is an American politician serving in the New York State Assembly representing the 46th district. He was a member of the Democratic Party, and was elected on November 7, 2006, to represent the 46th district, which covers the neighborhoods of Bath Beach, Bay Ridge, Brighton Beach, Coney Island, Dyker Heights, and Seagate, in Brooklyn. He resigned on July 7, 2015. Brook-Krasny was arrested on charges of felony healthcare fraud in 2017, but the case was dismissed in 2019 after he was acquitted of conspiracy and fraud charges and the jury could not agree on misdemeanor bribery counts.

In 2022, Brook-Krasny announced that he was joining the Republican Party and would contest the state assembly election in his former seat. He was elected with 52% of the vote.

== Early life and career ==
Brook-Krasny immigrated to the United States in 1989 from Moscow, where he had graduated from the Moscow Institute of Consumer Technology (currently the Russian State University for Tourism and Services) in 1983. After several years in New York City, he became a manager and started a children's entertainment and community center called Funorama, in Brighton Beach, Brooklyn.

== Political career ==
Brook-Krasny's first political campaign was in 2000 for the New York State Assembly. In 2001, he ran for the New York City Council. Although he won the endorsement of The New York Times, he lost the election to Domenic M. Recchia, Jr.

=== First tenure ===
In 2006, State Assemblywoman Adele Cohen retired and Brook-Krasny declared his candidacy for her position. He won the Democratic primary election, with 3,101 votes to Kagan's 2,958, and then won the general election over the Republican candidate, Patricia B. Laudano, 10,423 to 4,139 votes.

Brook-Krasny was reelected to his assembly seat in 2008, 2010, 2012, and 2014. During his tenure, he served on the Housing, Aging, Cities, Election Law, and Governmental Employees Committees. On June 11, 2015, he announced his resignation from the assembly effective July 7, to work in the private sector. He was succeeded by Pamela Harris, who was selected as the Democratic nominee by a party committee and then won the special general election in November. Harris, like Brook-Krasny, would later face criminal charges and she was succeeded by Mathylde Frontus in 2018.

=== Second tenure ===
In 2022, Brook-Krasny announced that he was joining the Republican Party and ending his membership with the Democratic Party. He ran for the New York State Assembly again as a Republican, successfully defeating Frontus. Brook-Krasny would receive criticism in January 2023 for hiring Katherine Khatari to his staff. Khatari, the first female elected to the Brooklyn Democratic Committee in 2018, formerly worked as a community associate for Brooklyn District Attorney Eric Gonzalez. Khatari became a Republican and a vocal supporter of Donald Trump, openly praising the January 6 United States Capitol attack after attending Donald Trump's rally on the same day. Brook-Krasny expressed "serious concerns" about her pro-January 6 post, but still hired her as his constituent services manager.

Brook-Krasny lost his re-election bid in the 2026 New York State Assembly election to Democrat Chris McCreight as Democrats expanded their Assembly majority statewide and in Brooklyn.

== Criminal charges ==
=== Arrest ===
In 2017, as part of "Operation Avalanche", Brook-Krasny was arrested on charges of healthcare fraud. He was indicted along with eight other individuals and corporate entities with schemes to illegally sell prescriptions for over 3.7 million opioid painkillers, to defraud Medicaid and Medicare of millions of dollars and to commit money laundering through two Brooklyn medical clinics owned by Lazar Feygin.

=== Acquittal, hung jury and dropped charges ===
After a trial that lasted two months, on July 25, 2019 Brook-Krasny was found not guilty of five felony charges of conspiracy, health care fraud, and scheming to defraud the state. A mistrial was declared on the other three misdemeanor commercial bribery charges after the jury could not reach a verdict.
