= Stroock & Stroock & Lavan =

Law firm based in New York City

Stroock & Stroock & Lavan LLP
- Headquarters: 180 Maiden Lane; New York City, U.S.
- No. of offices: 1
- No. of attorneys: 0
- Major practice areas: General practice
- Date founded: 1876
- Company type: Limited liability partnership
- Dissolved: October 2023
- Website: www.stroock.com

Stroock & Stroock & Lavan LLP (known as Stroock) was an American law firm based in New York City, with offices also in Los Angeles, Miami, and Washington, D.C.

Stroock provided transactional and litigation guidance to multinational corporations, financial institutions, investment banks, and private equity firms in the U.S. and abroad. Stroock's practice areas included capital markets/securities, commercial finance, mergers and acquisitions and joint ventures, private equity, private funds, derivatives and commodities, employment law and benefits, energy and project finance, entertainment, environmental law, financial restructuring, financial services litigation, government relations, insurance, intellectual property, investment management, litigation, national security, personal client services, real estate, structured finance, and tax.

The firm and many of its attorneys were annually ranked and listed in a number of industry publications, including Chambers USA, Chambers Global, The Legal 500, Best Lawyers, and Super Lawyers.

In late October 2023, the substantial number of its partnership joined transatlantic firm Hogan Lovells. By the end of October 2023, the partnership voted to dissolve the firm.

== History ==
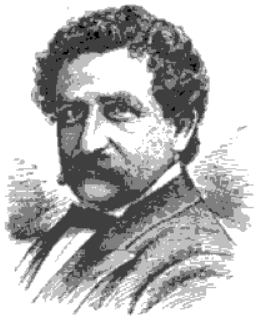
M. Warley Platzek

The firm originated in 1876 as the solo practice of M. Warley Platzek in New York City. Platzek had studied at New York University School of Law and trained in two law offices before opening his own, which concentrated on bankruptcy matters. In 1893, Moses J. Stroock, a graduate of Columbia Law School, and Paul M. Herzog, a graduate of New York Law School, became partners and the practice was renamed Platzek, Stroock & Herzog; after Herzog's departure in 1900, it practiced as Platzek and Stroock. Alongside his practice Platzek served as counsel to Tammany Hall. He left the partnership in 1907 for the New York Supreme Court, where he sat until 1924, and Sol M. Stroock, the younger brother of Moses J. Stroock, became a partner in the same year, the firm taking the name Stroock & Stroock.

In 1909, the partnership moved to 30 Broad Street, close to the New York Stock Exchange, and in 1918 to 141 Broadway, which remained its address until 1937. Peter I. B. Lavan, who graduated from Columbia Law School in 1918, joined soon afterwards and, during the 1930s, brought in substantial corporate and financial work as the firm shifted away from its earlier general practice. Sol Stroock died in 1941, at which point the firm's gross revenue stood at about $250,000; its five remaining partners weighed dissolving the practice or merging it before deciding to continue together under the name Stroock & Stroock & Lavan, formally adopted on January 1, 1943.

The firm stayed small for decades, numbering seven lawyers and about eight staff in 1924 and no more than fifteen lawyers throughout the 1940s, and its lawyers did not practice as specialists until that decade.

In December 1986, the firm announced a merger with Olnick Boxer Blumberg Lane & Troy, a New York real estate practice whose clients included Starrett Housing Corporation, American Express, and the Milstein family. Olnick Boxer contributed 28 lawyers and roughly $7 million in revenue to a firm that then had 265 lawyers and about $65 million. The combination took effect on January 1, 1987, after which Stroock employed more than 285 lawyers and over 425 secretaries, paralegals, and other staff across offices in New York, Los Angeles, Miami, and Washington, D.C. By 1989, it had 339 lawyers and gross revenue of $120 million, placing it among the twenty largest firms in New York City. Women accounted for about a third of its associates in the late 1980s, and ten of its partners were women.

As communist governments fell in Eastern Europe, Stroock lawyers working from the United States advised Bear, Stearns & Co. and other Western companies launching investment funds and acquiring businesses in Poland, Hungary, East Germany, and the Soviet Union. The firm opened a branch office in Budapest in 1990 and acquired the entire fourteen-lawyer intellectual property practice of Blum Kaplan in 1994. Its standing in The American Lawyer's ranking of the hundred highest-grossing American firms slipped over the following years, from 56th on 1997 revenue of $157.5 million to 63rd in 1998 and 78th in 1999, when revenue reached $166 million; profits per equity partner over the same period rose from $560,000 to $630,000. Headcount peaked at 374 in 2002, and revenue at $297 million in 2007.

The firm has assisted Mark Burnett and Roma Downey with legal advisement when forming the United Artist Media Group in September 2014.

Gross revenue fell 7.3 percent in 2017 to $251 million, and the number of lawyers dropped 9 percent to 251, while revenue per lawyer rose about 2 percent to $1 million and profit per equity partner rose 30.4 percent to $1.6 million, the firm's strongest showing on those measures in a decade. Stroock ranked 116th in the Am Law 200 at the time. Around twenty partners left during the year, among them about a dozen lawyers who moved to Proskauer Rose with Stuart Coleman, a former co-managing partner and chair of the investment management practice, and two intellectual property partners who joined King & Spalding. By 2019, gross revenue had recovered to $258 million, ranking the firm 122nd in the Am Law 200.

In response to the economic effects of the COVID-19 pandemic, the firm reduced compensation from June 1, 2020, cutting monthly draws for equity partners by 20 percent and those for contract partners by 15 percent, and reducing by 15 percent the salaries of lawyers below partner level and of staff earning more than $75,000. Lawyers on track for 1,800 or more client billable hours were to repay the reductions after the relevant quarter.

In March 2022, dozens of the firm's restructuring lawyers, eighteen of them partners, left for Paul Hastings in one of the largest such moves in the American legal market in recent years. Those departing included the practice group head Kris Hansen, who became co-chair of financial restructuring at Paul Hastings; the distressed mergers and acquisitions lead Brett Lawrence; the specialty finance lead Alex Cota; and Jayme Goldstein, who had run Stroock's restructuring business unit. The practice had been known for advising distressed-debt investors and other creditors in complex restructurings inside and outside bankruptcy. Reporting by Law.com put the total number of lawyers involved at 43.

Stroock publicly reaffirmed its commitment to remaining a mid-sized firm, pointing to more than twenty partners recruited over the preceding eighteen months in corporate, intellectual property, white collar, tax, and real estate work, and it recorded the second-highest revenue in its history as it approached its 150th anniversary. Transactional markets stalled in the second half of 2022, and the firm was subsequently linked with merger discussions involving Steptoe & Johnson, McGuireWoods, Squire Patton Boggs, and Nixon Peabody, with an unfunded pension obligation reported as an obstacle to agreement. Talks with Nixon Peabody ended in early July 2023, and later that month a team of reinsurance and consumer litigation lawyers moved to Steptoe, a group variously reported as 27 and as 35 lawyers. The firm secured the votes needed to buy out its pension obligations in August 2023, and partners authorized a future dissolution on October 24.

In October 2023, more than 30 out of the firm's remaining 46 partners, comprising a substantial majority of the partnership, were confirmed to have been hired by Hogan Lovells, raising questions about the firm's future.

On October 31, 2023, the remaining partners voted to dissolve the firm, leading to its demise.

Law.com, reporting partly on the basis of anonymous sources, attributed the collapse to a pension obligation addressed too late, successive waves of partner departures, poorly handled merger negotiations, and a cumbersome accounting system. Bloomberg Law reported that the firm's leaders sought an orderly wind-down that would keep partners from becoming personally liable for its debts by allowing them to leave before the formal dissolution and by persuading creditors that they would be paid out of remaining revenue rather than through bankruptcy proceedings. By mid-December 2023, the firm's website listed only nineteen lawyers before going offline, with its offices due to be vacated by the end of the month; among the last to leave were four white-collar lawyers who joined Seyfarth Shaw under Richard Morvillo.

== Notable clients and matters ==
In its early decades, the firm acted for wealthy families in trusts and estates work and for the Electric Boat Company of Groton, Connecticut, builder of the first submarine bought by the United States Navy, as well as for the Oceanic Cheese & Sausage Company, the clothing manufacturer Jacob Sperber, and several shipping and railroad concerns. Much of its clientele was drawn from New York's German-Jewish business families, among them Otto H. Kahn, Felix M. Warburg, Walter N. Rothschild, and Jacob Schiff. After the ratification of Prohibition, the firm represented the Wholesale Liquor Dealers of New York State, and it was retained by the Kentucky Distillers and Warehouse Co. to argue that the federal enforcement statute was unconstitutional, a position the U.S. Supreme Court rejected in 1919. The United Cigar Stores Company, which operated 409 outlets nationwide by 1910, was the firm's principal client until its bankruptcy in the 1930s and brought with it other tobacco clients, including George Washington Hill of Lucky Strike and Thomas Fortune Ryan. The firm represented the French bank De Rothschild Frères in a significant case in 1923, which it lost.

Through the 1930s, Peter I. B. Lavan handled the reorganizations of Twentieth Century-Fox and the Tobacco Products Company and helped establish United Merchants and Manufacturers. His work on Sears matters made the firm Sears's New York counsel and led to a long relationship with William Rosenwald, whom Lavan advised on the purchase of a substantial interest in the Empire State Building and on the formation of American Securities Corporation. American Molasses, a client since 1918, defeated a challenge involving New York City's sales tax in 1939, and in 1941 the Second Circuit rejected the royalty claims brought against the firm's client I. Rokeach & Sons by Parev Products. Sol M. Stroock sat in 1936 on the Citizens' Anti-Crime Committee appointed by Mayor Fiorello La Guardia, whose work assisted the special prosecutor Thomas E. Dewey in obtaining convictions. During the Second World War, the firm negotiated a licensing agreement under which the Elco division of Electric Boat produced PT boats for the Navy.

The government of Haiti engaged the firm in 1986 to recover assets taken by former president Jean-Claude Duvalier, tracing funds to Swiss and other bank accounts in preparation for proceedings in France. In 1992, the Hungarian government appointed Stroock its international counsel for a ten-year highway privatization program, and the firm also acted for AES in its pursuit of Hungarian energy contracts. During the 1990s, it represented Carl C. Icahn in his capacity as the largest investor in RJR Nabisco Holding Corporation, as well as DoubleClick and Premium Sales Corp. In 2017, the firm took roles in the Avaya and Seadrill bankruptcies, acting in the latter as lead counsel to an ad hoc group holding unsecured bonds issued by Seadrill Limited and North Atlantic Drilling, and served as lead insurance mergers and acquisitions counsel to Atlas Merchant Capital in the $2.05 billion purchase of Talcott Resolution, the run-off life insurance and annuity business of The Hartford.

== Practice areas ==
Stroock's main practice groups included:

- Corporate (i.e., Capital Markets/Securities; Commercial Finance; Mergers, Acquisitions, and Joint Ventures; and Private Equity/Venture Capital)
- Commodities and Derivatives
- Employee Benefits and Executive Compensation
- Employment Law
- Energy and Project Finance
- Entertainment
- Environmental Law
- Financial Restructuring
- Financial Services Litigation
- Government Relations
- Insurance
- Intellectual Property
- Investment Management (including Private Funds)
- Litigation
- National Security/CFIUS Compliance
- Personal Client Services
- Pro Bono
- Real Estate
- Structured Finance
- Tax

== Notable past and current attorneys ==
- Robert Abrams, former New York State Attorney General
- Brian Cogan, federal judge
- Briahna Joy Gray, political consultant
- Rita Hauser, US Ambassador to the UN Human Rights Council
- Alvin Hellerstein, federal judge
- Edward Korman, federal judge
- Benedict I. Lubell, oil industry executive
- Jules Polonetsky, head of the Future of Privacy Forum
- Maxwell M. Rabb, former ambassador
- Shira Scheindlin, federal judge
- Lou Silver, American-Israeli basketball player
- William vanden Heuvel, former ambassador
- Randi Weingarten, president of the American Federation of Teachers
