= American Film Market =

Annual film industry event

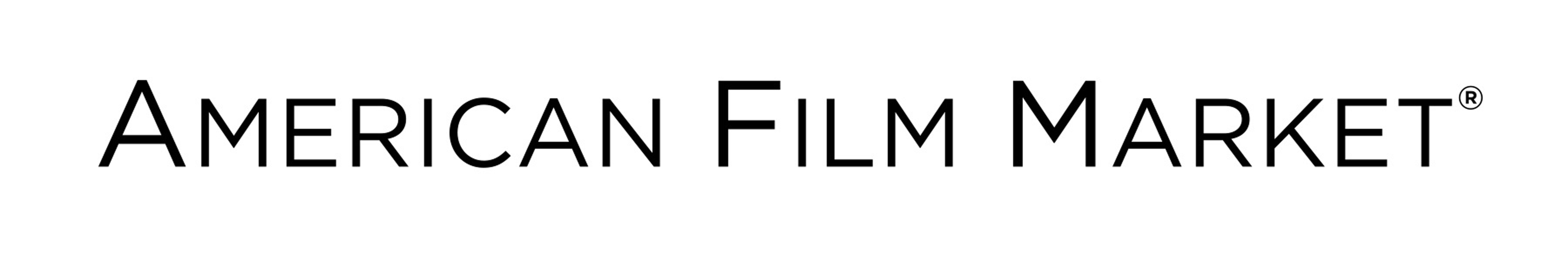

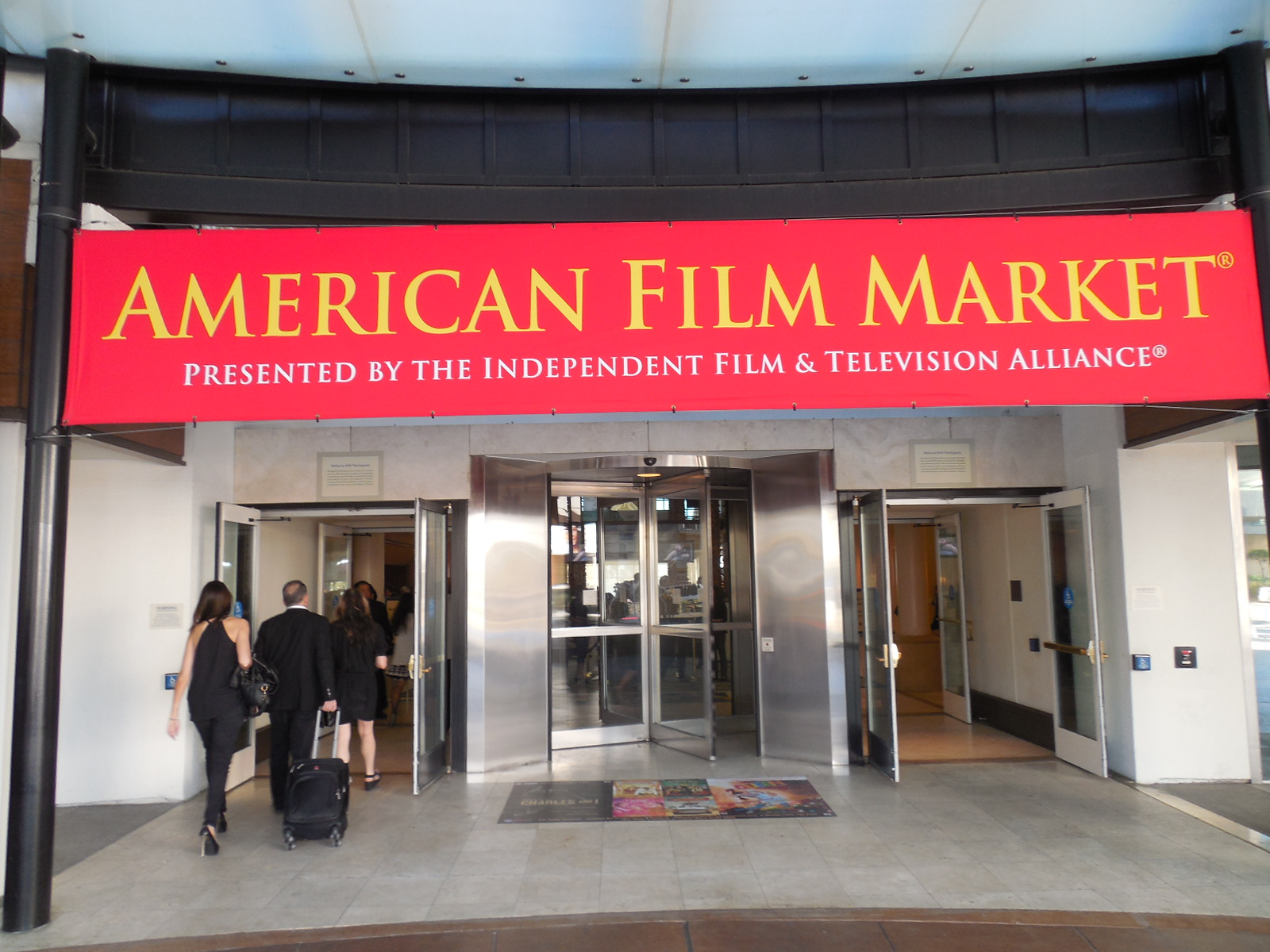
- Entrance at Fairmont Century Plaza Hotel
- Nickname: AFM
- Status: Active
- Genre: Film market
- Frequency: Annually
- Venue: Fairmont Century Plaza Hotel; Previously: Loews Santa Monica Beach Hotel; Le Merigot Beach Hotel; Palms Casino Resort
- Locations: Los Angeles, California; Previously: Santa Monica, California; Las Vegas, Nevada
- Country: United States
- Inaugurated: March 21, 1981
- Founder: Andy Vajna
- Participants: 8,000+
- Organizer: Independent Film & Television Alliance
- Filing status: Nonprofit
- Website: americanfilmmarket.com

The American Film Market (AFM) is a film industry event held annually in early November. Historically, more than 7,000 people attend the eight-day annual event to network and to sell, finance, and acquire films. Participants come from more than 70 countries and include acquisition and development executives, agents, attorneys, directors, distributors, festival directors, financiers, film commissioners, producers, writers, etc. Founded in 1981, the AFM is a marketplace for the film business, where, unlike a film festival, production and distribution deals are the main focus of the participants.

== History ==
The American Film Market was founded by the American Film Marketing Association, headed by film producer Andy Vajna. The American Film Market held its first event from March 21–31, 1981. The AFM has been held at the Loews Santa Monica Beach Hotel since 1991. The AFM is produced by the Independent Film & Television Alliance (IFTA), a trade association representing the world's producers and distributors of independent motion pictures and television programs.

In 2024, the market was moved to the Palms Casino Resort in Las Vegas, Nevada. It is the first time the market is held outside of Los Angeles.

== Screenings ==
The American Film Market utilizes 29 movie theater screens on Santa Monica's Third Street Promenade and in the surrounding community to accommodate 700 screenings of over 400 films (often world or U.S. premieres). The films shown are ones seeking theatrical and television distribution. In order to keep up with the demand for screenings, in 2017 the American Film Market launched AFM Screening on Demand, a video-on-demand platform provided by Shift72 that allowed buyers to watch films outside of the limited screening times. This also allowed the 2020 and 2021 editions to be held online-only in the first week of November due to the COVID-19 pandemic.
