= Peter I. B. Lavan =

American lawyer

Peter I. B. Lavan was an American philanthropist, lawyer, and name partner of law firm Stroock & Stroock & Lavan.

== Early life and education ==
Lavan was born in Brooklyn on August 5, 1895. He graduated from Columbia College in 1915 and Columbia Law School in 1918.

== Career ==
He joined Stroock & Stroock as a partner upon graduation in 1918 and became senior partner in 1943. Since then, the firm is known as Stroock & Stroock & Lavan. In 1956 he appointed by Dwight D. Eisenhower to chair the United States Committee for the United Nations.

As a philanthropist, he supported the Berkshire Theater Festival and the Academy of American Poets. The annual Peter I. B. Lavan Younger Poets Award was set up by the Academy in 1983, some well-known poets were awarded, including Rita Dove, William Logan, Jorie Graham and Christopher Merrill.

== Personal life ==
Lavan died of heart failure on July 29, 1988, at his home in Great Barrington, Massachusetts. He was 93 years old.
