= Moses J. Stroock =

Jewish-American lawyer

Moses Jesse Stroock (August 18, 1866 – October 27, 1931), was a Jewish-American lawyer from New York.

== Life ==
Stroock was born on August 18, 1866, in New York City, New York, the son of Samuel Stroock and Mariana Marcuse. His father was a German immigrant who came to America in the mid-19th century and founded a large woolen mill in Newburgh, New York.

Stroock attended public schools. He received a B.S. from the College of the City of New York in 1886 and an LL.B. from Columbia Law School in 1888. Stroock was admitted to the bar that year and began practicing law. In 1896, he formed a partnership with M. Warley Platzek and his brother Sol M. Stroock. When Platzek became a New York Supreme Court Justice in 1907, Stroock formed a new firm that specialized in corporation law with his brother Sol called Stroock & Stroock. The firm, located at 141 Broadway, acted as counsel for various corporations over the years, including the Submarine Boat Company during World War I, the United Cigar Stores Company, the Electro-Dynamic Company, Elco Works, and several boat and marine firms. In 1919, the firm also acted for the Wholesale Liquor Dealers Association of New York State. In 1927, Justice Victor J. Dowling appointed him a member of an advisory committee to draft a plan for an automobile compensation bureau.

In 1911, Mayor William Jay Gaynor appointed Stroock a trustee of the College of the City of New York. He was reappointed a trustee by Mayor John Purroy Mitchel in 1917 and by Mayor Jimmy Walker in 1926. By the latter year, he was chairman of the board of trustees. In 1926, he was also elected the first Chairman of the Board of Higher Education. As a trustee, he and City College president John H. Finley were active in promoting the establishment of a business college that was connected to the State Chamber of Commerce. In later years, he became concerned with clarifying the legal interpretation of the powers and duties of the Board of Higher Education and was involved with finding a site for Brooklyn College. In 1926, he established a $1,000 fund for a new prize for students of the School of Business of City College. In his last appearance in front of the Board of Estimates before his death, he defended the education board for retaining a $500,000 fund Aldermanic President Joseph V. McKee accused the board of hiding.

In 1928, Stroock received an honorary Doctor of Laws degree from St. John's College. Active in Jewish organizations, he was involved with the Federation for the Support of Jewish Philanthropic Societies and served as a director of the Jewish Board of Guardians, The Menorah Journal, and the Training School for Jewish Social Work, the Allied Dental Clinic, the Marhsal Stillman Movement, and the Northwoods Sanatorium for the Tuberculosis. He was also general counsel for Montefiore Hospital. He was a member of the New York State Bar Association, the New York County Lawyers' Association, the New York City Bar Association, the New York Law Institute, the Academy of Political Science, the New York Academy of Sciences, the Association for the Protection of the Adirondacks, the American Jewish Committee, the American Museum of Natural History, the American Red Cross, the Brooklyn and New York Federations of Charities, the Boy Scout Foundation, Irvington House, the Jewish Theological Seminary, the Jewish Mental Health Society, the Jewish Education Society, the New York Guild for Jewish Blind, the New York Geographical Society, the Society of Medico Legal Jurisprudence, Phi Beta Kappa, the Lotos Club, the Bankers Club, the Harmonie Club, and the Rouissencent Club.

In 1896, Stroock married Cora Valman, with Rabbi Stephen S. Wise performing the ceremony. In 1921, he married his second wife, Mrs. Nellie G. Loeb, at the St. Regis Hotel, with Judge Benjamin N. Cardozo performing the ceremony. His children from his first marriage were Mrs. Sidney Bacharach and Mrs. George W. Gallinger. He was a member of the Free Synagogue, Temple Emanu-El, and Temple B'nai Jeshurun.

Stroock died at home from pneumonia on October 27, 1931. 5,000 people attended his funeral in the Great Hall of the College of the City of New York, and classes were cancelled at Brooklyn College, Hunter College, and City College for the funeral. Rabbi Stephen S. Wise conducted the funeral service. The City College R.O.T.C. served as a guard of honor for the coffin, the procession included former associates on the Board of Higher Education and delegations from all three city colleges, and the honorary pallbearers were Judge Benjamin N. Cardozo, Frederick B. Robinson, Charles H. Tuttle, former Justice Joseph M. Proskauer, Charles Gimbel, Henry R. Stuphen, Henry Carse, Charles Bernheim, John Burke, Dr. Emanuel Libman, Dr. Milton Rosenbluth, Charles Levy, David Metzger, and Edward Steinam. The funeral was attended by, among other people, Felix M. Warburg of Kuhn, Loeb & Co., John H. Finley, former New York Attorney General Albert Ottinger, Board of Education president George J. Ryan, author Rebecca Kohut, Rabbi Louis Finkelstein, Max D. Steuer, former president of the Board of Aldermen and City College trustee George McAneny, Professor Louis Sayre Buchard, Justice Thomas W. Churchill, Frederick Hausman of A. A. Hausman & Co., Jewish Theological Seminary librarian Professor Lewis Marks, Congregation B'nai Jeshurun president Charles W. Endel, Justice Isaac Cohen, Jewish Educational Association president Israel Unterberg, and former vice-president of Engineering News Alfred E. Kornfeld. He was buried in Beth Olam Cemetery in Cypress Hills, Brooklyn.
