= Pamela Harris (politician) =

American politician

Member of the New York State Assembly from the 46th district
- In office November 4, 2015 – April 2, 2018
- Preceded by: Alec Brook-Krasny
- Succeeded by: Mathylde Frontus

Personal details
- Born: Brooklyn, New York
- Party: Democratic
- Spouse: Leon Harris
- Education: St. Joseph's College, B.S. Capella University, M.A.

Pamela Harris is a Democratic politician who was a member of the New York State Assembly representing the 46th Assembly District from 2015 to 2018, covering the neighborhoods of Bath Beach, Bay Ridge, Brighton Beach, Coney Island, Dyker Heights, and Seagate, in Brooklyn, until she resigned under a fraud indictment.

Harris pleaded guilty in June 2018 in federal court to two counts of wire fraud, one count of making false statements to the U.S. Federal Emergency Management Agency (FEMA), and one count of witness tampering, after having been indicted in January following allegations she stole $25,000 in federal funds by falsely claiming that damage from Superstorm Sandy forced her from her Coney Island home.

== Biography ==
Harris has been a lifelong resident of Coney Island and the assembly district she represented. She graduated from John Dewey High School in Brooklyn in 1977. She has an associate's degree in general studies from John Jay College of Criminal Justice, a bachelor's degree in health and human services from St. Joseph's College, and a master's degree in human development and family studies from Capella University.

Prior to becoming an assemblywoman, she worked for the New York City Department of Correction as an officer on Riker's Island, and after she retired from that job, became a community activist who was well known locally for her work as head of Coney Island Generation Gap and for her advocacy and participation in relief efforts to help those who lost their homes or had damage to their property as a result of Hurricane Sandy.

== Election to the New York State Assembly ==
On July 7, 2015, Alec Brook-Krasny, then the assemblyman for the 46th district, resigned to take a private sector job. Because of the timing of his resignation, the Democratic nominee for the special general election to fill the remainder of Brook-Krasny's term was selected by the Kings County Democratic Party Executive Committee, not a party primary election. Harris obtained the political backing and endorsement of several key local Brooklyn Democrats, including U.S. Congressman Hakeem Jeffries, New York State Assemblyman William Colton, New York State Senator Diane Savino, New York City Councilmen Mark Treyger and David Greenfield, and Brooklyn Democratic District Leader Nancy Tong, and was selected by the committee as the Democratic nominee. She also won the backing of the Working Families Party.

After obtaining the Democratic nomination, Harris obtained more endorsements from local politicians, as well as from organizations such as labor unions local 1199–SEIU United Healthcare Workers, the Patrolmen's Benevolent Association of the City of New York, District Council 37, the New York City and Vicinity District Council of Carpenters, the New York City Corrections Officers' Benevolent Association, the New York State AFL–CIO, and the United Federation of Teachers.

In the special election held on November 3, 2015, Harris won by a margin of 62.9% to 37.1% over Lucretia Regina-Potter, who ran on both the Republican Party and Conservative Party Party lines. She was sworn into office the following month. With the victory, Harris became the first black woman to represent a majority white district in New York City.

Harris won re-nomination in the Democratic primary in September 2016, defeating Katie A. Cucco, and was re-elected in the general election on November 8, 2016, defeating Regina-Potter again (Republican and Fusion), Mikhail Usher (Conservative), and Patrick Dwyer (Green).

== Indictment ==
On January 9, 2018, Harris was indicted on two counts of wire fraud, one count of conspiracy to commit wire fraud, four counts of making false statements, two counts of bankruptcy fraud, one count of witness tampering, and one count of conspiracy to obstruct justice. The charges stemmed from false claims and statements alleged to have occurred following Superstorm Sandy, and were brought by Richard Donoghue, the interim United States Attorney for the Eastern District of New York. Harris was alleged to have stolen nearly $25,000 from the Federal Emergency Management Agency, as well as money from other agencies including the New York City Council, the New York City Department of Youth and Community Development, the United States Department of Housing and Urban Development, and the New York City Build it Back Program. Prosecutors said Harris falsely claimed that she was forced out of her Coney Island home because of Hurricane Sandy damage, submitted fake lease agreements and rent receipts for a home in Staten Island while still in her Coney Island residence, and pocketed the FEMA cash. She then allegedly obstructed the investigation into her crimes and pressured witnesses to lie to the FBI and cover up her various fraud schemes. Harris allegedly commenced her criminal activity in 2012, before she held elective office, and continued it during her assembly tenure. She pleaded not guilty to the charges.

== Resignation from the assembly ==
On April 2, 2018, two days after the assembly finished its deadline work on the New York State state budget, Harris resigned her seat in a letter to Carl Heastie, the assembly speaker, in order to address her criminal case.

== Guilty plea and sentencing ==
Harris' trial was scheduled for July 2018, but in June, she pleaded guilty to four of the charges in the indictment – two counts of wire fraud, one count of making false statements to FEMA, and one count of witness tampering.

In September, she was ordered to forfeit $10,000 to the United States government, and on October 24, she was sentenced to six months in jail followed by three years of supervised release, 400 hours of community service, and restitution of $45,600 to the City of New York for the money stolen from Coney Island Generation Gap and $24,800 to the U.S. government for the money stolen from FEMA. She reported to prison on December 4, 2018 and served her sentence at Alderson, a minimum security federal prison camp, inmate locator 90597-053.

New York State Assembly
Preceded by Alec Brook-Krasny	New York State Assembly; 46th District; 2015–2018	Succeeded by Mathylde Frontus
