= Chris McCreight =

American politician

Member-elect of the New York State Assembly from the 46th district
- Assuming office January 2027
- Succeeding: Alec Brook-Krasny

Personal details
- Party: Democratic

Chris McCreight is an American politician. He is the Democratic member-elect of the New York State Assembly from the 46th district, defeating Alec Brook-Krasny. Prior to his election, he was a local Democratic Party organizer, campaign manager, and political advisor who served as chief of staff to Justin Brannan and chief advisor to successor Kayla Santosuosso.

== Political career ==
McCreight co-founded the Bay Ridge Democrats, as well as the Bay Ridge for Obama grassroots organization supporting Barack Obama's subsequently successful campaign in the 2008 Democratic Party presidential primaries. In 2020, he was elected Democratic District Leader for New York's 64th State Assembly district.

In 2013, McCreight served as a campaign manager for Sal Albanese's campaign in the New York City mayoral election and Vincent J. Gentile's campaign in the New York City Council election. In the City Council, he served as chief of staff to Justin Brannan, and after Brannan termed out in 2025, later chief advisor to successor Kayla Santosuosso. He has also worked as a small business owner.

During the 2020 presidential election, McCreight condemned president Donald Trump as "a racist [and] a fascist", saying that "he’s just the worst thing that happened to this country". In March 2025, he joined a protest against cuts to Medicaid at Nicole Malliotakis' Bay Ridge office, being photographed alongside Santosuosso.

=== State Assembly runs ===
McCreight ran as a Democratic candidate in New York's 46th State Assembly district in the 2018 election, but dropped out because he felt this would take too much attention from local congressional and State Senate races.

In February 2024, McCreight launched his campaign for the 46th district against Republican incumbent Alec Brook-Krasny, citing his perceived absence and lack of benefits to the district. Alison Argueta Raudales of City & State remarked that the two, in addition to Brook-Krasny's status as a former Democrat, "share[d] overlapping support on many local issues" such as housing, education, and small businesses, as well as freeing the Gaza war hostages. He was endorsed by Chuck Schumer, Letitia James, and Antonio Reynoso, as well as several Brooklyn legislators. He narrowly lost to Brook-Krasny with 47% of the vote.

In 2026, McCreight challenged Brook-Krasny in a rematch for the seat at that year's election, with the incumbent being criticized for his absence, lack of name recognition, and broken campaign promises. Affordability was a central part of his campaign, which also included issues such as infrastructure improvement, the LGBTQ+ and immigrant communities. He won the seat with 56% of the vote, unseating Brook-Krasny.
