= Independent Film & Television Alliance =

- Type: Incentive
- Industry: trade association
- Founded: 1980; United States
- Headquarters: California
- Website: ifta-online.org

The Independent Film & Television Alliance (IFTA) is the trade association that represents companies that finance, produce and license independent film and television programming worldwide. The association is headquartered in Los Angeles, but has a global membership and wide scope of services and advocacy. Its roster of 150 member companies in 23 countries include independent production and distribution companies, sales agents, television companies, studio-affiliated companies and financial institutions. IFTA members create more than 500 independent films and countless hours of TV programming each year generating a revenue of $4 billion annually.

The freedom for independents to create and distribute movies and television shows has been threatened by a handful of consolidated media companies that control programming and distribution. As the voice and advocate for the independent industry worldwide, IFTA continues to increase public awareness of the major issues facing independents and publicly represents the independent film industry on such matters as the threat to a competitive marketplace seen in media consolidation; net neutrality; the elimination of trade barriers; the impact of new technology on our traditional business models; anti-piracy; improvement of copyright protection around the world; and the need to foster broad-based growth of the industry.

To that end, IFTA executives meet regularly with Washington lawmakers to advocate on behalf of reasonable and limited regulations to restore balance in the television and cable marketplace. IFTA endorses the principles of "net neutrality" or open access to the Internet. Net neutrality is currently threatened if broadband providers are able to discriminate in favor of certain content or applications, potentially replicating the closed and vertically integrated structure with traditional programming and distribution platforms.

In December 2008, IFTA called on the new Obama Administration to appoint an FCC chairman and commissioners who support principles of openness and diversity in the media with an open letter to his transition team, including Julius Genachowski, who was confirmed as the new FCC chairman.

IFTA lobbies against market barriers that impede the independents' ability to compete fully in national markets around the world, including import and censorship restrictions and weak copyright protection. IFTA is a member of the Center for Copyright Information (CCI), that aims to reduce online copyright infringement through a graduated response scheme called the Copyright Alert System.

== What is an Independent? ==
According to IFTA:

An independent film or television program is financed primarily from sources outside the seven major U.S. studios. Independent entertainment programming is made at every budget range, from mainstream commercial to art house, and is seen by the public side-by-side with major studio releases. IFTA's member companies are the independents who finance, license, and produce this programming.

Some members of the IFTA are subsidiaries of the Big Five movie studios, such as New Line Cinema and HBO which are owned by Warner Bros., and Focus Features which is owned by NBCUniversal.

== IFTA leadership ==
Jean Prewitt became IFTA's President in April 2000 and was promoted to Chief Executive Officer in December 2001. Prior to joining IFTA, Prewitt was a senior government official and lobbyist for the film and entertainment industry for nearly ten years. Before her time in Washington DC, she was Senior Vice President and General Counsel of United International Pictures (the international distribution entity formed by then-Universal, Paramount and MGM-UA studios), managing international legal and government affairs.

Jonathan Wolf has been IFTA's Executive Vice President and Managing Director of the American Film Market since 1998. He joined IFTA in 1993 as Senior Vice President of Business Development. Before joining IFTA, Wolf served two years as President & COO of Studio Three Film Corporation, a U.S. theatrical distribution company.

In September 26, 2017 Michael Ryan was elected for a second two-year term as Chairman of the Alliance until 2019. Another appointments include Andrew Kramer (Lionsgate) as General Vice Chairperson and Clay Epstein as Vice Chairperson. Jay Joyce, Lloyd Kaufman (Troma Entertainment), Charlotte Mickie and Almira Ravil continue to serve as members of the Executive Committee through their second year of their term. The Board of Directors include Tannaz Anisi, Paul Bales (The Asylum), Jason Buckley (Lakeshore Entertainment), Carl Clifton (Hyde Park International), Caroline Couret-Delegue, Kirk D'Amico (Myriad Pictures), Jeffrey Greenstein (Millennium Media), Lise Romanoff, Gabrielle Stewart, Jeannine Tang, Shaked Berenson (Epic Pictures Group), Tamara Birkemoe (Foresight Unlimited), Jody Cipriano (MarVista Entertainment), Alexandra Cocean (Voltage Pictures), Camela Galano, Brad Krevoy, Albert Lee, Nat McCormick, Michael Rothstein and Alison Thompson.

Effective February 1, 2026, Jackie Brenneman has been named president and CEO. She will succeed Jean Prewitt, who is stepping down after 25 years leading the organization.

== History ==
A group of independent producers established the American Film Market and the AFM's parent, the non-profit American Film Marketing Association, in 1980 to expand the independent film business. In 2004, the organization changed its name and expanded its scope to include television with the formation of the Independent Film & Television Alliance.

Collectively, independents produce the largest number of motion picture industry jobs, films and, over the past quarter century, Academy Award-winning movies. IFTA members have produced and distributed such Best Picture Oscar winners as Gandhi (1982); Amadeus (1984); Platoon (1986); The Last Emperor (1987); Driving Miss Daisy (1989); Dances with Wolves (1990); The Silence of the Lambs (1991); Braveheart (1995); The English Patient (1996); Shakespeare in Love (1998); Chicago (2002); The Lord of the Rings: The Return of the King (2003); Million Dollar Baby (2004); Crash (2004); The Departed (2006); No Country for Old Men (2007) Slumdog Millionaire (2008), The Hurt Locker, (2009); The King's Speech (2010); and The Artist (2011).

Most recently, some of the world's most prominent films were produced, distributed and financed by IFTA Members: Milk (2008); The Reader (2008); The Wrestler (2008); Doubt (2008); Vicky Cristina Barcelona (2008); W (2008); Twilight (2008); Defiance (2008); I've Loved You So Long (2008); Burn After Reading (2008); Inglourious Basterds (2009); Taken (2009); Paranormal Activity (2010); Twilight Saga: Eclipse (2010); Insidious (2011); The Lincoln Lawyer (2011); The Hunger Games (2012); Now You See Me (2013).

IFTA members, as well as the entire independent film industry, benefit from the American Film Market (AFM), which has grown into one of the world's largest film markets, as well as the organization's standard form contracts and publications. Acting as an arbitration tribunal, IFTA resolves distribution-related disputes between parties.

== See also ==
- International Intellectual Property Alliance
