= Lotos Club =

Private social club in New York City

Coordinates: 40°46′6.46″N 73°58′8.51″W

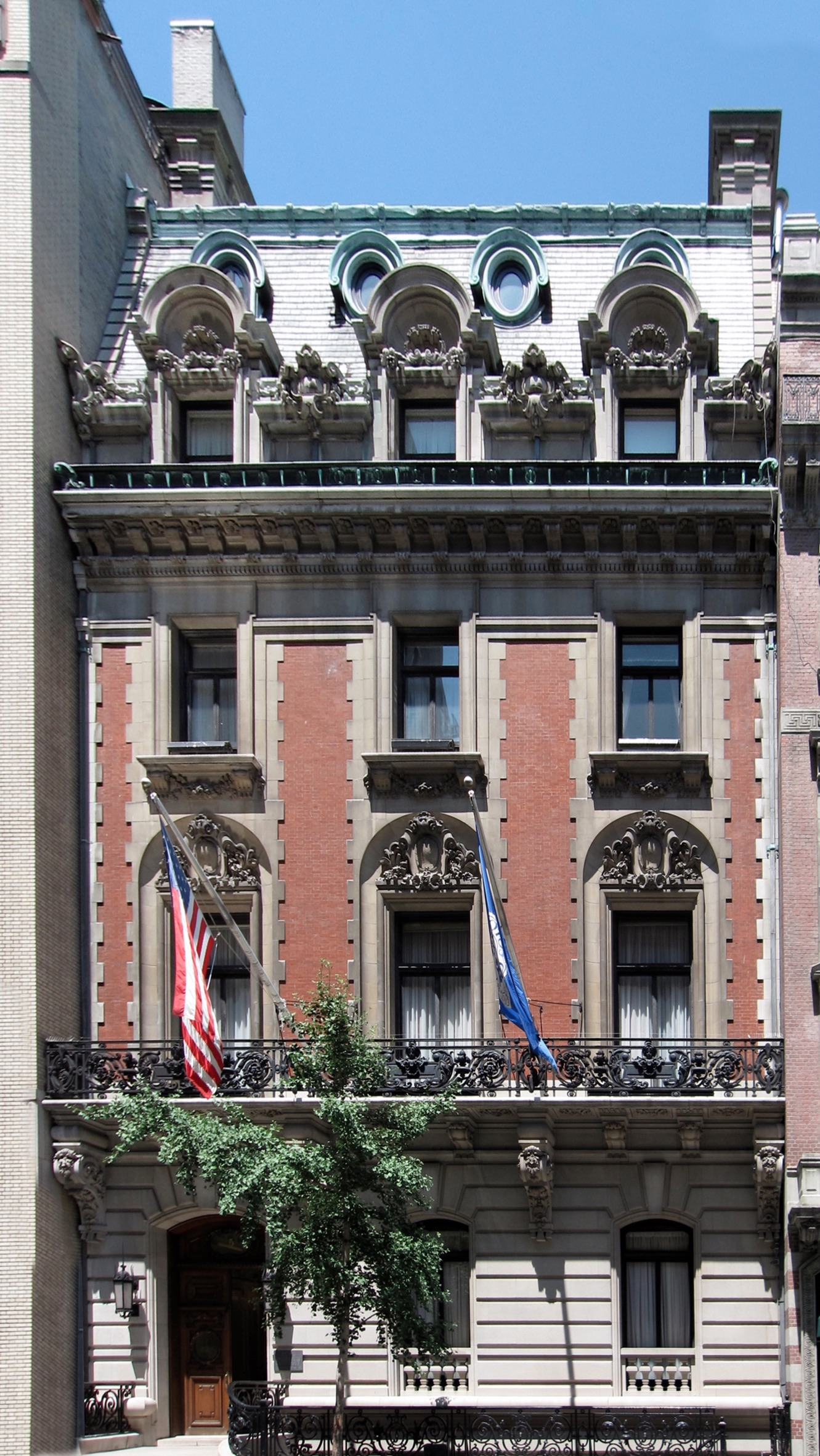
- The Lotos Club at 5 East 66th St., designed by Richard Howland Hunt
- Formation: March 15, 1870
- Type: Private social club
- Headquarters: 5 East 66th Street
- Location: New York, New York
- Website: lotosclub.org

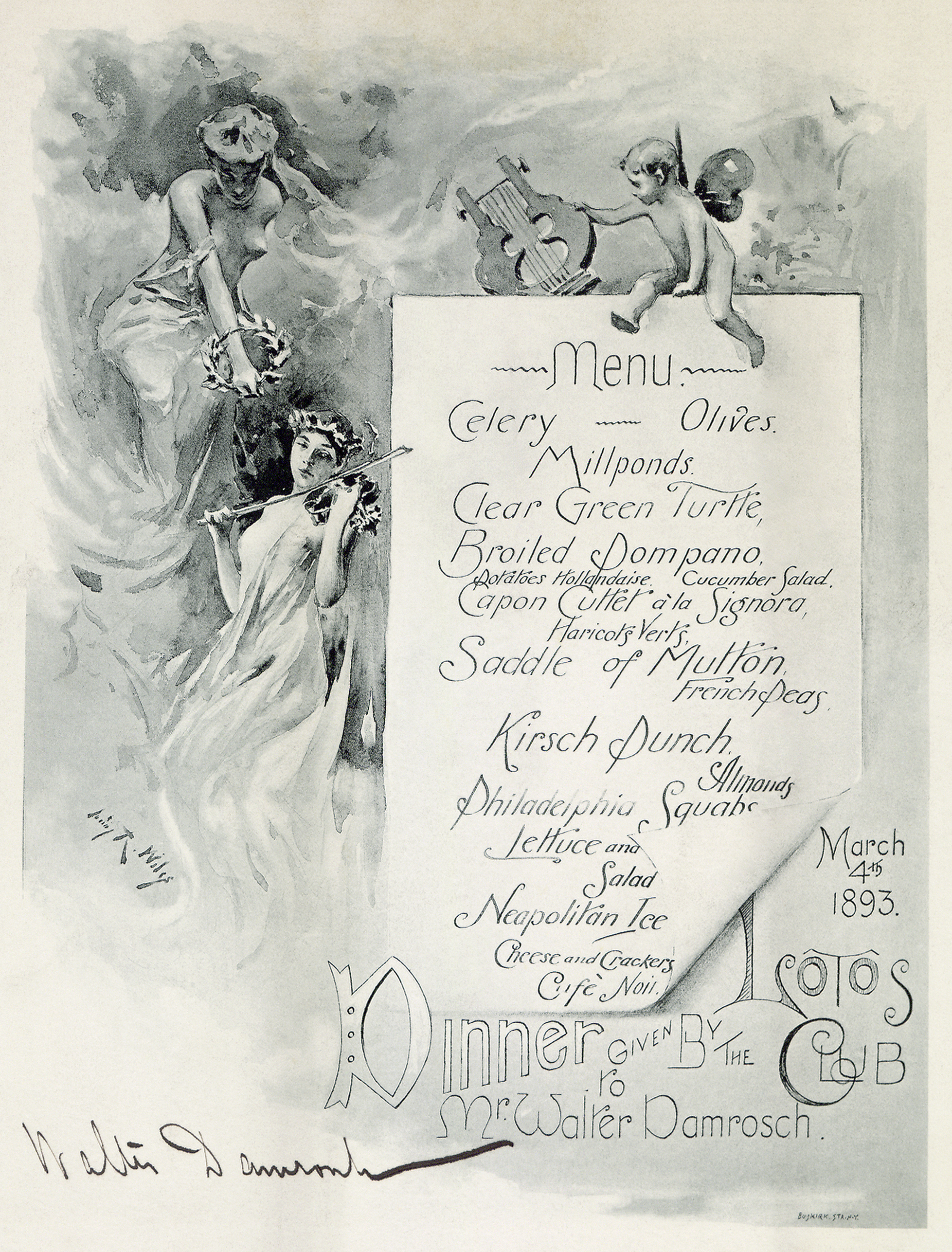
A table d'hôte menu from the dinner for Walter Damrosch at the Lotos Club, 1893

The Lotos Club is a private social club in New York City. Founded primarily by a young group of writers and critics in 1870 as a gentlemen's club, it began accepting women as members in 1977. Mark Twain, an early member, called it the "Ace of Clubs". The Club took its name from the poem "The Lotos-Eaters" by Alfred, Lord Tennyson, which was then very popular. Lotos was thought to convey an idea of rest and harmony. Two lines from the poem were selected for the Club motto:

In the afternoon they came unto a land / In which it seemed always afternoon

The Lotos Club has always had a literary and artistic bent, with the result that it has accumulated a collection of American paintings. Its "State Dinners" (1893 menu at right below) are events for scholars, artists and sculptors, collectors and connoisseurs, writers and journalists, and politicians and diplomats. Elaborate souvenir menus are produced for these dinners.

The Lotos Club is classified under the status 501(c)(7) Social and Recreation Clubs; in 2025 it reported $9,109,630 in total revenue and $16,111,887 in total assets.

== History ==
The Lotos Club's first home was at Two Irving Place, north of 14th Street near the Academy of Music and on the site of the Consolidated Edison Building. Journalist DeWitt Van Buren was the Lotos Club's first president; he was succeeded by A. Oakey Hall. Dramatist and actor John Brougham was the Lotos Club's first vice president and he later became president of the club. Other early Club officers included Vice President F.A. Schwab, Secretary George Hows, and Treasurer Albert Weber. New York Tribune editor Whitelaw Reid was elected Club president in 1877, at which time the Lotos Club moved to 149 Fifth Avenue at 21st Street.

556 Fifth Avenue in the 1890s

In 1893, the Club moved to 556–558 Fifth Avenue at 46th Street, purchasing its first clubhouse.

It was at the Lotos Club in 1906 that George Harvey, editor of Harper's Weekly, sent up his first trial balloon by proposing Woodrow Wilson for the office of President of the United States. In 1909, with financial backing from Andrew Carnegie, the clubhouse was moved to 110 West 57th Street, in a building designed by architect Donn Barber.

Frank R. Lawrence was the club's longest-serving president, from March 1889 until his death on October 26, 1918. Lawrence was succeeded as president by Chester S. Lord, who served for five years. In 1923, Columbia University president Nicholas Murray Butler was elected president of the club.

The club has a long history of showing the work of its artist members and has also held exhibitions of work from the collections of its members including one in 1910 that featured works by Degas, Monet, Renoir, Cassatt, and Hassam.

In October 1941 the club held a mortgage-burning ceremony to mark payment of the $389,000 owed on the West 57th Street building. However, in 1945 members began considering a move to a "simpler clubhouse". The club has been housed since 1947 in a 1900 clubhouse designed by Richard Howland Hunt at 5 East 66th Street. The building had been commissioned by Margaret Louisa Vanderbilt Shepard as a gift for her daughter, Mrs. William Jay Schieffelin, in 1900.

In 1977, the Club amended its constitution to admit women.

== Constitution ==
The objectives of this institution shall be to promote and develop literature, art, sculpture, music, architecture, journalism, drama, science, education and the learned professions, and to that end to encourage authors, artists, sculptors, architects, journalists, educators, scientists and members of the musical, dramatic, and learned professions in their work, and for these purposes to provide a place of assembly for them and other persons interested in and sympathetic to them, and their objectives, effort and work.

== Lotos Club Medal of Merit ==
The Lotos Club issues a Medal of Merit; previous recipients include general David Petraeus, scientist James D. Watson, flautist Jean-Pierre Rampal, and puppeteer Bil Baird.

The club also awards a Foundation Prize and an Award of Distinction.

== Reciprocal Clubs ==
=== Domestic ===
- The Fort Orange Cub (Albany)
- The Buffalo Club (Buffalo)
- The Saturn Club (Buffalo)
- The Union League Club (Chicago)
- The Chicago Club (Chicago)
- The Fort Worth Club (Fort Worth)
- The Pacific Club (Honolulu)
- The Columbia Club (Indianapolis)
- The California Club (Los Angeles)
- The Minneapolis Club (Minneapolis)
- The Union League (Philadelphia)
- The University Club (Portland)
- The Hope Club (Providence)
- The Genesee Valley Club (Rochester)
- Presidio Golf and Concordia Club (San Francisco)
- The University Club (San Francisco)
- The Rainier Club (Seattle)
- The Cosmos Club (Washington D.C.)
- The university (Washington D.C.)
- University and Whist Club (Wilmington)
- Worcester Club (Worcester)

=== International ===
- Athens Club (Athens)
- Circulo Ecuestre (Barcelona)
- The United Service Club (Brisbane)
- Cercle Royale Gaulois (Brussels)
- Kildare Street and University Club (Dublin)
- Il Circolo dell'Unione (Florence)
- The Royal Bachelors' Club (Gothenburg)
- The Hong Kong Club (Hong Kong)
- The Athenaeum (London)
- The East India Club (London)
- The Garrick Club (London)
- The Lansdowne Club (London)
- The Reform Club (London)
- The Savile Club (London)
- Le Cercle Munster (Luxembourg)
- Gran Pena (Madrid)
- The Australian Club (Melbourne)
- Circolo dell'Unione (Milan)
- Cercle de l'Union Interalliee (Paris)
- The Quebec Garrison Club (Quebec)
- Nuovo Circolo degli Scacchi (Rome)
- Sallskapet Club (Stockholm)
- The Union University & Schools Club (Sydney)
- The National Club (Toronto)
- The University Club (Toronto)
- The Wellington Club (Wellington)

== Notable members ==
- Brooke Astor
- Mikhail Baryshnikov
- Kathleen Battle
- Andrew Carnegie
- Walter P. Chrysler
- Mary Higgins Clark
- William A. Clark, whose portrait hangs in the club
- Samuel Clemens
- George M. Cohan
- Hume Cronyn
- Mario Cuomo
- David Dinkins
- Dwight D. Eisenhower
- Renee Fleming
- Gilbert and Sullivan
- Alan Gilbert
- John Gribbel
- Solomon R. Guggenheim
- William Randolph Hearst
- David M. Heyman
- Marilyn Horne
- Leslie Howard
- Alleyne Ireland
- Sir Henry Irving
- Joseph Koch
- Angela Lansbury
- Leonard Liebling
- Wynton Marsalis
- Margaret Mead
- Burgess Meredith
- Peter O'Toole
- William S. Paley
- Christopher Plummer
- Julian Rix
- Charles M. Schwab
- Cyrus Ingerson Scofield
- Bobby Short
- Beverly Sills
- Stephen Sondheim
- Isaac Stern
- Elaine Stritch
- Susan Stroman
- Moses J. Stroock
- Arthur Hays Sulzberger
- Jessica Tandy
- J. Walter Thompson
- Orson Welles
- P. G. Wodehouse
- Tom Wolfe
- James Wolfensohn
- Frank Winfield Woolworth
- Andrew Wyeth
- Yo-Yo Ma
- James D. Watson
- Ronald Sherr

== See also ==
- List of American gentlemen's clubs
