= Future of Privacy Forum =

- Website: fpf.org

The Future of Privacy Forum is an American advocacy group focused on issues of data privacy headquartered in Washington DC.

Members include AT&T, Comcast, Facebook, Google, Intelius and Microsoft, the Bill & Melinda Gates Foundation, Robert Wood Johnson Foundation, National Science Foundation, and the Digital Trust Foundation. The organization is run by Jules Polonetsky, the former chief privacy officer for AOL and Doubleclick. The founder and co-chair is Christopher Wolf, a lawyer who leads the privacy group at the law firm of Hogan Lovells. The advisory board includes representatives of LinkedIn, IAPP, Dell, Facebook, Microsoft, WalMart, ViacomCBS, T-Mobile, SAP, LiveRamp, Reddit, eBay and Uber.

In 2015, the Future of Privacy Forum announced Washington and Lee University School of Law as its academic partner.

Polonetsky is also on the advisory board of the Center for Copyright Information, the industry-run organization in charge of the "6 strikes" graduated response system for copyright infringement.
