= Russian State University of Tourism and Services Studies =

Russian State University of Tourism and Service
- Российский государственный университет туризма и сервиса
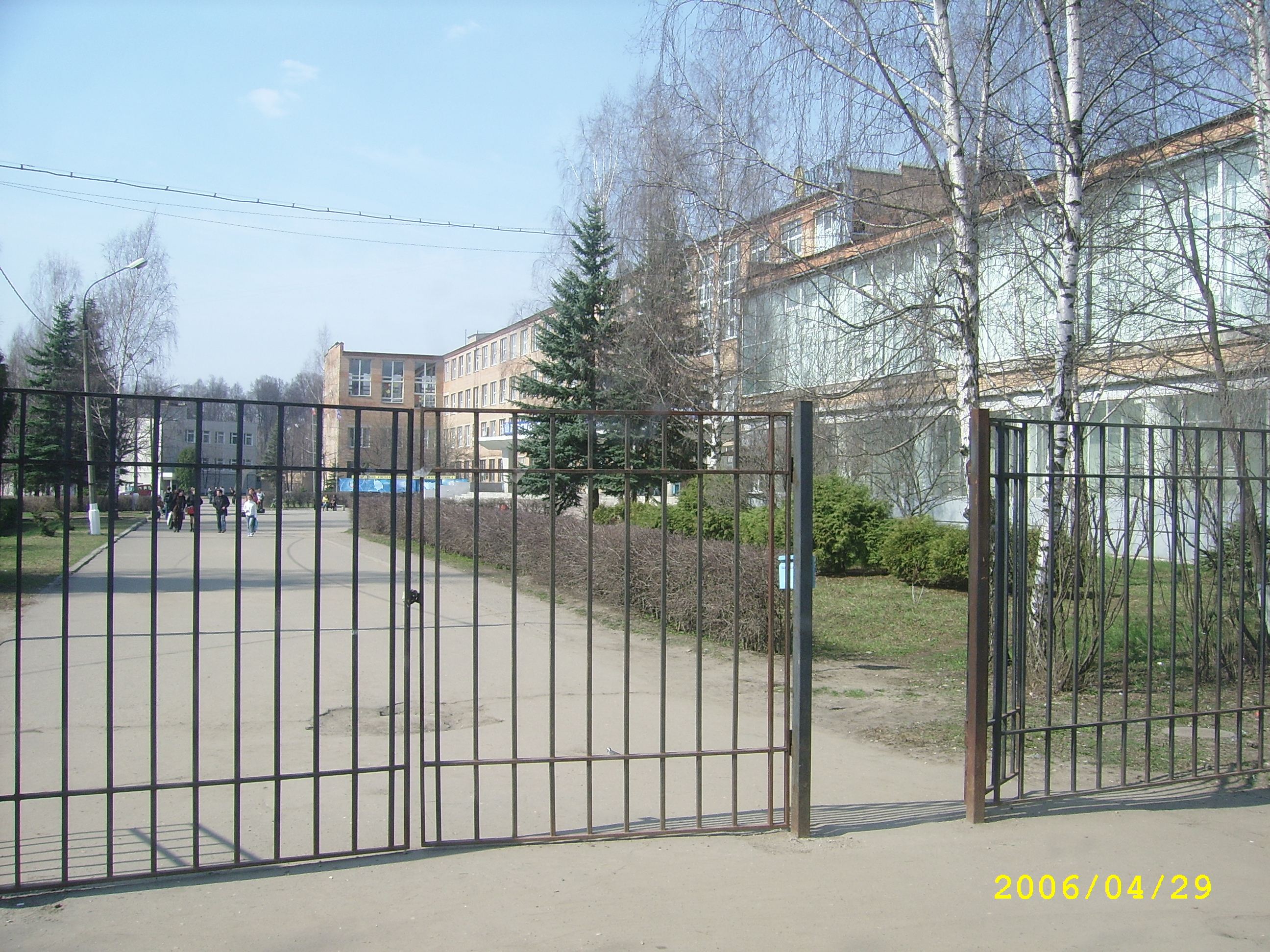
- Type: Public
- Established: August 13, 1952; 74 years ago
- Rector: Aleksander A. Fedulin
- Location: 99, street Glavnaya, p Cherkizovo, Pushkinsky District, Province of Moscow, 141221, Pushkino, Moscow Oblast, Russia; 55.9700°N 37.7892°E
- Website: www.rguts.ru

University rankings

Regional – Overall
- QS Emerging Europe and Central Asia: 401-450 (2022)

Russian State University of Tourism and Service (Russian: Федеральное государственное бюджетное образовательное учреждение высшего образования «Российский государственный университет туризма и сервиса» (ФГБОУ ВО «РГУТИС»)) is a public university in Russia and CIS countries that provides higher education in tourism and services studies. The university is based in Pushkino, Moscow Oblast, near Moscow, and has its own campus in Makhachkala.

Originally a higher school of handicraft cooperation, it was founded in 1952 by the Resolution of the Council of Ministers of the USSR dated August 13, 1952 No. 3741.

== Departments ==
=== Faculty of Services Studies ===
- Department of Appliances
- Department of Information systems
- Department of Safety Technosector and Chemical Technology
- Department of Service Centers and Transportation Services

=== Faculty of Tourism and Hospitality Management Studies ===
- Department of Public Relations
- Department of Restaurant and Hotel Services Organization and Technology
- Department of Tourism Activities Organization and Technology

=== Faculty of Technology and Design ===
- Department of Artistic Design of Object-Spatial Environment
- Department of Sewing and Knitting Products Design and Technology
- Department of Drawing and Painting
- Department of Materials and Product Expertise
- Department of Art and Interior Design Products and Technology

=== Faculty of Economics ===
- Department of Accounting and Taxation Studies
- Department of Corporate Governance and E-Business
- Department of Economics and Business Studies
- Department of Finance
- Department of Labor Economics and HR Management
- Department of Management
- Department of Marketing and Commerce
- Department of State and Municipal Administration

=== Faculty of Law and Social Communications ===
- Department of Civil Law
- Department of Criminal Law
- Department of Psychology and Social Work
- Department of Social Technology
- Department of State and Legal

=== Universal Departments ===
- Department of Economics
- Department of Engineering Mechanics
- Department of Foreign Languages
- Department of History and Political Studies
- Department of Mathematics and IT
- Department of Philosophy and Cultural Studies
- Department of Physical Culture and Sport
- Department of Russian Language and the Culture of Speech
- Department of Science Education
- Department of Sociology and Education

=== Regional Departments ===
- Centre for Accelerated Learning
- Regional Department of Services Studies in Podolsk
