= John Sturrock =

John Sturrock may refer to:

- Sir John Sturrock (colonial administrator) (1875–1937), British colonial official
- John Sturrock (politician) (1878–1943), British politician and journalist
- John Sturrock (rugby union) (1880–1940), Scottish rugby union player
- John Sturrock (rower) (1915–1974), English rower
- John Sturrock (writer) (1930–2017), English writer, editor, reviewer and translator
