= Sturrock =

Sturrock is a surname. Notable people with the name include:

- Archibald Sturrock (1816–1909), Scottish mechanical engineer
- Blair Sturrock (born 1981), Scottish soccer player
- David Sturrock (born 1938), Scottish-born soccer player
- Frederick Sturrock (1882–1958), South African politician
- Ian Sturrock, British botanist specialising in orchards and apple trees
- Jock Sturrock (1915–1997), Australian yachtsman
- John Sturrock (disambiguation), several people
- John Leng Sturrock (1878–1943), Scottish newspaper publisher and politician
- Kathron Sturrock, British pianist
- Paul Sturrock (born 1956), Scottish soccer manager
- Peter Sturrock (MP) (1820–1904), Scottish civil engineer, colliery owner and politician
- Peter A. Sturrock (1924–2024), British astrophysicist
