= 1993 New York City Comptroller election =

- November 2, 1993

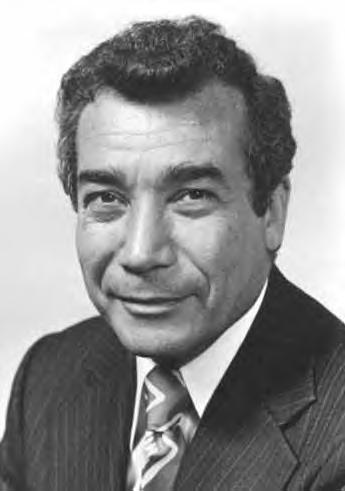
Nominee	Alan Hevesi	Herman Badillo
Party	Democratic	Republican
Alliance		Liberal
Popular vote	918,412	682,864
Percentage	56.00%	41.64%
- Results by State Assembly district Hevesi: 40–50% 50–60% 60–70% 70–80% 80–90% >90% Badillo: 40–50% 50–60% 60–70% 70–80%
Comptroller before election
Elizabeth Holtzman
Democratic
Elected Comptroller
Alan Hevesi
Democratic

The 1993 New York City Comptroller election was held on November 2, 1993. Democratic nominee Alan Hevesi defeated Republican nominee Herman Badillo with 56.00% of the vote.

Primary elections were held on September 14, 1993.

== Democratic primary ==
=== Candidates ===
- Alan Hevesi, Assemblyman from Forest Hills
- Elizabeth Holtzman, incumbent New York City Comptroller
- Herman Badillo, former U.S. Representative from the Bronx (also running as Republican and Liberal)

=== Results ===
Results by State Assembly district Hevesi: 30%–40%; 40%–50%; 50%–60%; 60%–70%; Holtzman: 30%–40%; 40%–50%; 50%–60%; 60%–70%; Badillo: 30%–40%; 40%–50%; 50%–60%; 60%–70%

Democratic primary results
Party	Candidate	Votes	%
Democratic	Alan Hevesi	182,492	35.25
Democratic	Elizabeth Holtzman (incumbent)	175,267	33.85
Democratic	Herman Badillo	159,950	30.90
Total votes		517,709	100.00

=== Runoff results ===
Democratic primary results
Party	Candidate	Votes	%
Democratic	Alan Hevesi	171,609	66.72
Democratic	Elizabeth Holtzman (incumbent)	85,606	33.28
Total votes		257,215	100.00

== General election ==
=== Candidates ===
- Herman Badillo, former U.S. Representative from the Bronx (Republican and Liberal)
- Barbara S. Bollaert, candidate for City Council President in 1989 (Right to Life)
- Natalie Harris (Socialist)
- Alan Hevesi, Assemblyman from Forest Hills (Democratic)
- Vicki Kirkland (Libertarian)
- Howard Lim Jr. (Conservative)

=== Results ===
1993 New York City Comptroller election
Party	Candidate	Votes	%	±%
Democratic	Alan Hevesi	918,412	56.00%	
Republican	Herman Badillo	682,864	41.64%	
Right to Life	Barbara S. Bollaert	13,972	0.85%	
Conservative	Howard Lim Jr.	13,743	0.84%	
Socialist Workers	Natalie Harris	6,806	0.42%	
Libertarian	Vicki Kirkland	4,263	0.26%	
Majority		235,548		
Turnout				
Democratic hold		Swing		
