= Sol M. Stroock =

Jewish-American lawyer (1873–1941)

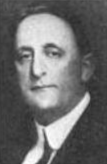
- Born: Solomon Marcuse Stroock; September 22, 1873; New York, New York, US
- Died: September 11, 1941 (aged 67); White Sulphur Springs, West Virginia, US
- Burial place: Salem Fields Cemetery
- Education: College of the City of New York; Columbia School of Political Science; Columbia Law School
- Occupation: Lawyer
- Spouse: Hilda Weil (m. 1904)
- Children: 3

Solomon Marcuse Stroock (September 22, 1873 – September 11, 1941) was a Jewish-American lawyer from New York.

== Life ==
Stroock was born on September 22, 1873, in New York City, New York, the son of Samuel Stroock and Mariana Marcuse. His parents were both German immigrants who came to America in the 1840s. His father served as a captain in the Confederate Army during the American Civil War and founded the firm S. Stroock & Co., which manufactured felts, plushes, woolens, and blankets, at Newburgh, New York, in 1870. His uncle was the Jewish historian Abraham Berliner.

Stroock graduated from the College of the City of New York with a B.S. in 1891, Columbia University's School of Political Science with an M.A. in 1892, and Columbia Law School in 1894. He was then admitted to the bar and initially practiced in the office of Morris Goodhart. In 1896, he formed a partnership with M. Warley Platzek and his brother Moses J. Stroock. When Platzek became a Justice on the New York Supreme Court in 1907, Stroock formed a new law firm with his brother Moses called Stroock & Stroock, which specialized in corporation law.

Stroock appeared as counsel in a number of cases in state and federal courts, including the Supreme Court of the United States, although his reputation wasn't made as a trial counsel but as an advisor and office practitioner. Devoted much of his time to educational, civic, and philanthropic activities in his later years, he was an organizing member of the Citizens Committee for Control of Crime and Citizens Non-Partisan Committee. He was especially interested in the proper education of young lawyers and spent a lot of time on post-admission education. In World War I, he was a member of the New York City board of appeals under the selective service law.

Stroock was a member of at least one New York City Bar Association committee for almost two decades, serving as chairman of the Committee of Legal Education and as vice-president of the Association. He was also a member of the Legal Education Committee for the New York State Bar Association, served the New York County Lawyers' Association in several capacities, and was a member of the American Bar Association. In 1931, he was named chairman of the Character and Fitness Committee of the New York State Supreme Court, Appellate Division, First Department. Columbia Law School made him a member of its Board of Fellows, and in 1931 Columbia University president Nicholas Murray Butler gave him the Columbia University Medal.

Stroock was chairman of the board of directors of the Jewish Theological Seminary of America and president of its library. He was also member of the American Jewish Historical Society from 1901 until his death, and in 1903 he published a study in the Publications of the American Jewish Historical Society on the diplomatic controversy between the United States and Switzerland concerning the status of Jews in two Swiss cantons, one of the first authoritative investigations on the subject. He worked with Cyrus Adler and Felix M. Warburg in guiding a number of Jewish institutions following the death of Louis Marshall, and when Warburg died and Adler's health began to fail much of the burden fell on Stroock.

Stroock was president of the YMHA of New York from 1924 to 1926, and from 1925 to 1930 he was head of the Metropolitan League of Jewish Community Centers and president of the Federation for the Jewish Philanthropic Societies in New York City. He became chairman of the executive committee of the American Jewish Committee in 1934, and in 1941 he became president of the organization. He was a founder of the Jewish Agency for Palestine and served as a member of the non-Zionist section of the Agency. He was a board member of the Judaeans and became its vice-president in 1931. In 1895, he became secretary of Congregation B'nai Jeshurun, a position he held for a decade. He also served as principal of the congregation's religious school, which he graduated from. While he remained deeply affiliated with the congregation throughout his life, he joined two Reform congregations in his later years.

Stroock received honorary D.H.L. degrees from the Jewish Institute of Religion in 1931 and from the Jewish Theological Seminary in 1935. Politically, he was a Democrat. He was a fellow of the Royal Economic Society, a patron of the Archaeological Institute of America, and a member of the American Academy of Political and Social Science, the American Political Science Association, the American Economic Association, the American Geographical Society, the American Historical Society, Phi Beta Kappa, the Freemasons, the Faculty Club of Harvard University, the Harmonie Club, and the Bohemian Club. In 1904, he married Hilda Weil. Their children were Minette (wife of Samuel Louis Kuhn), Robert Louis, and Alan Maxwell.

Stroock died from a heart attack while vacationing at the Greenbrier Hotel in White Sulphur Springs, West Virginia. Several hundred people attended his funeral at Temple Emanu-El, including distinguished jurists and representatives of Jewish organizations. Rabbi Stephen S. Wise delivered the eulogy, and Rabbis Samuel H. Goldenson, Samuel Schulman, and Israel Goldstein officiated the funeral. The honorary pallbearers were William Rosenwald, Irwin Untermyer, Paul F. Warburg, Henry Ittleson, Judge Irving Lehman, Dr. Sol Lowenstein and Samuel Leidesdorf. After the funeral, a funeral cortege led by three flower-laden automobiles went to Salem Fields Cemetery, where he was buried.
