= Leslie Harris (lawyer) =

American businesswoman

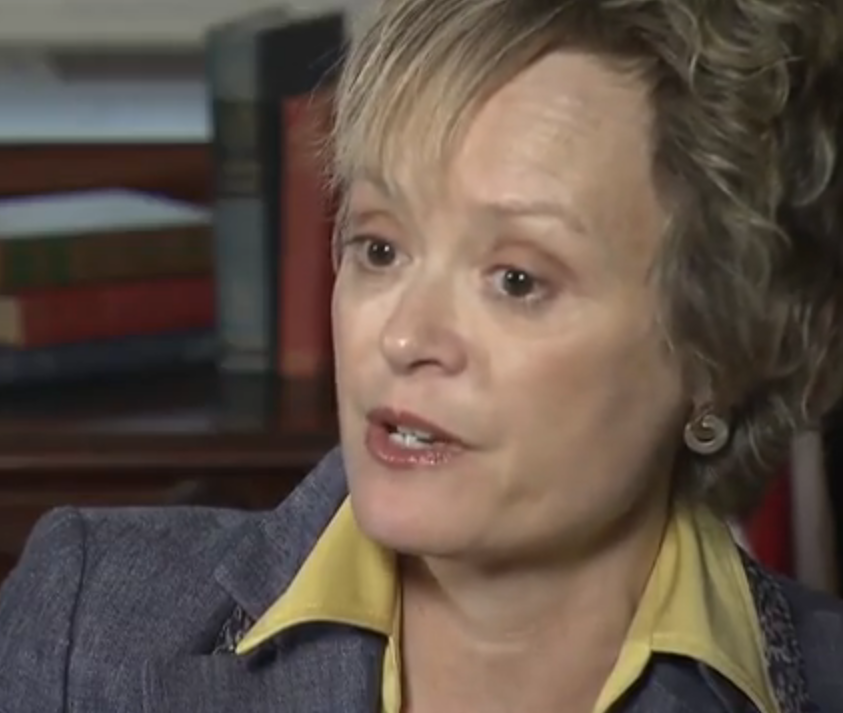
- Harris speaking in 2009
- Born: United States
- Occupations: President and CEO, Center for Democracy and Technology

Leslie Harris was the president and chief executive officer of the Center for Democracy and Technology (CDT) in Washington, D.C. in the United States. Harris joined CDT in 2005 as executive director. She managed the organization and served as its chief spokesperson, and occasionally testified before Congress.

CDT prepared a detailed Internet policy document for the Obama administration and Harris said she felt the administration had listened.

She founded Leslie Harris & Associates, and has worked for People for the American Way and the American Civil Liberties Union. She holds a law degree from Georgetown University Law Center and a bachelor's degree from the University of North Carolina.
