= Adele Cohen =

American lawyer & politician (born 1942)

Member of the New York State Assembly from the 46th district
- In office February 9, 1998 – November 7, 2006
- Preceded by: Jules Polonetsky
- Succeeded by: Alec Brook-Krasny

Personal details
- Born: July 19, 1942 (age 84) New York City, New York
- Party: Democratic
- Spouse: Steven Cohen

Adele H. Cohen (born July 19, 1942) is an American lawyer and former politician. She is a 1964 graduate of Brooklyn College.

== Participation in politics ==
=== 1991 race for New York City Council ===
After having failed in her first attempt to run for office against incumbent City Councilman Samuel Horowitz in the 33rd district of New York City in 1989, Cohen made her second run for office in the 1991 Democratic primary election for New York City Council District 48 in Southern Brooklyn, which had been created as part of the expansion of the city council membership prior to the election. She ran in a tightly contested six-way Democratic primary that included both Anthony Weiner, the future Congressman who was then a congressional aide to U.S. Senator Chuck Schumer, and Michael Garson, who was endorsed by the Kings County Democratic County Committee, representing a labor-dominated coalition known as the Majority Coalition for a New New York.

Controversy erupted in the last weeks of the campaign, however, when Weiner's campaign anonymously spread leaflets around the district which alleged ties between Cohen and the so-called "Jackson-Dinkins agenda." The leaflets referred to the Crown Heights riots earlier in the year, which suggested that Jesse Jackson (who became notorious for his earlier remarks about New York City as "Hymietown") and mayor David Dinkins as having been beholden to the predominantly-African-American rioters, and thus endangering white residents. Dinkins, during the campaign, described the leaflet as "hateful". When Weiner admitted his campaign's distribution of the leaflets, he stated that he "didn't want the source to be confused with the message"; The New York Times issued an editorial which rebuked Weiner's "hit-and-run tactics". Cohen lost the primary to Weiner by 195 votes. Weiner also won the November election, widely considered a formality with no opposition in the heavily Democratic district.

The next year, Cohen was selected as the state chairwoman of the National Women's Political Caucus. She ran again for the City Council's 27th District against Howard L. Lasher in 1997, but lost in the three-way Democratic primary.

=== State Assembly ===
In 1998, Cohen ran for the New York State Assembly's 46th district in the special election to succeed outgoing assemblyman Jules Polonetsky, with the nomination of the Democratic, Independence and Liberal parties and she won against Joseph A. Kovac, a nominee of the Republican and Conservative parties. She served as an assemblywoman until she returned to private law practice in 2006. Initially a member of the Standing Committee on Insurance, she served from 2005 to 2006 as chairwoman of the Assembly Commission on Science and Technology during her time in office.

== Personal life ==
Cohen is a 1964 graduate of Brooklyn College. She later pursued a J.D. degree from the New York Law School after her children grew up, gaining it in 1987. She then became a lawyer for District Council 37. She is married to Steven, a former principal of P.S. X012 Lewis and Clark School, and has three children, Gene Robert (b. 1966), Deborah and Ronald (b. 1964). Gene was a director of Graphnet in Teaneck, N.J., and a graduate of the Massachusetts Institute of Technology; Ronald is an assistant professor of chemistry, geology and geophysics at the University of California at Berkeley and graduated from Wesleyan University.

New York State Assembly
| Preceded by Jules Polonetsky | New York State Assembly, 46th District; 1998–2006 | Succeeded by Alec Brook-Krasny |
