= Jules Polonetsky =

American politician

Jules Polonetsky (born August 18, 1965) is an American lawyer and internet privacy expert from Brighton Beach, Brooklyn, New York, who is Chief Executive Officer of the Future of Privacy Forum. He is co-editor of the Cambridge Handbook on Consumer Privacy, with co-editors Omer Tene and Evan Selinger.

== Education ==
Polonetsky graduated from Yeshiva University and New York University School of Law.

== Career ==
He began his career in 1989 as an associate for Stroock & Stroock & Lavan and later was a district representative for United States Representative, Steve Solarz, from 1990 to 1992. From 1992 to 1993, Polonetsky was a legislative aide to United States Representative, Charles Schumer.

Polonetsky served in the New York State Assembly, from 1994 to 1997, representing southern Brooklyn. From 1998 to 2000, he served as commissioner of the New York City Department of Consumer Affairs. During this role, Polonetsky was responsible for ensuring that all consumer advertising and sales complied with City, State and Federal consumer protection laws.

He was the Chief Privacy Officer, first for DoubleClick from 2000 to 2002, and then for AOL. During his time at DoubleClick, Polonetsky worked with clients to institute and supervise their privacy policies and ensure that they complied with data protection requirements of the company's world-wide subsidiaries. He also oversaw the company's government affairs activities and consumer-related advertising practices and was the company's spokesperson for comprehensive policy issues.

From 2002 to 2006, Polonetsky was AOL’s Vice President of Integrity Assurance. He then was AOL's CPO from 2006 to 2008, where he was responsible for maintaining users trust in the company to handle their information. He also educated employees about the best advertising, content, and product development practices. During his time as CPO, Polonetsky also was the Senior Vice President of Consumer Advocacy.

He has been the Future of Privacy Forum's CEO since its founding in 2008. FPF is a nonprofit organization that serves as a catalyst for privacy leadership and scholarship, advancing principled data practices in support of emerging technologies. FPF's current projects focus on artificial intelligence and machine learning, connected cars, student privacy, health information, advertising tech, smart communities and data sharing for research.

He is the co-founder of the Israel Policy Tech Institute (IPTI), which is a think-tank for tech policy leadership and scholarship that advances ethical practices in support of emerging technologies.

Polonetsky led the development of the Student Privacy Pledge, endorsed by Barack Obama, and committed to by 350+ companies. The Student Privacy Pledge was introduced to safeguard student privacy regarding the collection, maintenance, and use of student personal information.

He has led numerous, multi-stakeholder efforts to develop codes of conduct and best practices, which include the Mobile Location Analytics Opt-Out technology and Privacy Best Practices for Consumer Genetic Testing Services.

== Involvement ==
From 2011 to 2012, Polonetsky was appointed to the Department of Homeland Security Data Privacy and Integrity Advisory Committee.

He has been on the boards of multiple privacy and consumer protection organizations including International Association of Privacy Professionals and the Network Advertising Initiative.

He has been on the Advisory Board of Trustees, now TrustArc, and is on the Advisory Board of OneTrust.

Polonetsky is a member of the George Washington University Law School Privacy and Security Advisory Council.

He is a frequent speaker at privacy and technology events and has presented and testified before Congressional committees and the Federal Trade Commission.

New York State Assembly
Preceded by Howard L. Lasher	New York State Assembly; 46th District; 1994–1997	Succeeded by Adele Cohen
