= List of killings by law enforcement officers in the United States in the 1950s =

This is a list of people reported killed by non-military law enforcement officers in the United States in the 20th century, whether in the line of duty or not, and regardless of reason or method. The listing documents the occurrence of a death, making no implications regarding wrongdoing or justification on the part of the person killed or officer involved. Killings are arranged by date of the incident that caused death. Different death dates, if known, are noted in the description. This page lists 151 people.

== 1950s ==
The table below lists 151 people.

Date	Name (age) of deceased	State (city)	Description
1959-12-26	Neil Rouse (31)	Ohio (Dayton)	
1959-11-20	Unnamed youth	New Jersey (Elizabeth)	
1959-10-24	Levi Williams (48)	Alabama (Clayton)	
1959-09-23	Roscoe Simpson (30)	Wisconsin (Milwaukee)	
1959-09-19	Walter Budwell III (31)	Virginia (Crewe)	
1959-07-06	Milton Graniela (22)	New York (Manhattan)	
1959-06-22	Earl Vincent Burton (39)	Kentucky (Louisville)	
1959-03-06	James Lee Franklin (43)	Virginia (Virginia Beach)	
1959-02-17	Carl Biggins (17)	Texas (Dallas)	
1958-11-09	Angelo Aviles (18)	New York (Manhattan)	
1958-03-14	Sandra Lingscheit (16)	Washington (Toppenish)	
1958-03-13	Dudley Adolph Enfinger (18)	Georgia (Atlanta)	
1958-03-09	Thomas Rolleston (38)	New York (New York)	
1958-03-07	Ivan Carter (70)	New Jersey (Newawk)	
1958-03-06	William Formella (24)	Illinois (Chicago)	
1958-03-05	Nathaniel Turner (35)	Connecticut (New Britain)	
1958-02-27	G. F. "Jack" McMichael (36)	Texas (Odessa)	
1958-02-26	Martin James Lawler (26)	New York (New York)	
1958-02-22	Elmer Lewis Miller (55)	Michigan (Detroit)	
1958-02-16	William Iooss (14)	New York (East Meadow)	
1958-02-15	Theodore E. Anderson (40)	Oregon (Portland)	
1958-02-14	Richard Benson (19)	Ohio (Ravenna)	
1958-02-10	Kenneth Jackson (19)	Illinois (Chicago)	
1958-02-08	James C. Hope (25)	California (Los Angeles)	
1958-02-07	Solomon Brown (30)	Virginia (Marion)	
1958-02-05	Michael Rudis (42)	Illinois (Blue Island)	
1958-02-04	Jewell English (24)	Kentucky (Paducah)	
1958-02-02	Daniel Bell (23)	Wisconsin (Milwaukee)	
1958-01-29	Robert Dosch (24)	Illinois (Chicago)	
1958-01-28	Leonard Minor Jr. (20)	Pennsylvania (Upper Darby)	
1958-01-22	Henry Seymour (21)	Mississippi (Biloxi)	
1958-01-21	Leroy Leophart	New York (New York)	
1958-01-19	Jasper Richard Cotton (32)	Florida (Tampa)	
1958-01-18	Doniso Hernandez (78)	California (Compton)	Hernandez was struck and killed by.an officer driving a police radio car.
1958-01-17	Versal Skillin (36)	California (San Diego)	
1958-01-16	Herman Dursoy Jr. (25)	Pennsylvania (Hazleton)	
1958-01-09	James Sharp (21)	California (Wilmington)	
1958-01-08	George Love (38)	Mississippi (Ruleville)	
1958-01-08	James C. White (31)	Ohio (Cleveland)	A police officer shot and killed White while he was fleeing the scene of an attempted burglary.
1958-01-02	Frank Cruz (20)	Texas (San Antonio)	Cruz was shot and killed by policeman while allegedly attempting to burglarize a drug store.
1958-01-02	Victor Koren (25)	Texas (Laredo)	
1958-01-01	Luiz Silva (48)	California (Castro Valley)	
1957-12-31	John Serino (19)	California (Los Angeles)	
1957-12-23	Clarence Horatious Pickett	Columbus (Georgia)	Pickett was beaten by a police officer while in a jail cell and died from his injuries two days later.
1957-12-25	Allen Hecht	California (Oakland)	
1957-12-19	Unnamed man (30s)	New York (Manhattan)	
1957-10-01	Ralph Walker Taylor(36)	Indiana	Taylor and his compatriot, Victor Wayne Whitley, ran a police roadblock and were fired on by police. Taylor was killed by officer Lester Kenan. Whitley escaped and was captured the next day.
1957-04-25	George Kern (29)	New York (Manhattan)	
1957-02-23	Nickey Nader (49)	Ohio (Forestville)	Nader was killed with Michael Burke during a police ambush of a supermarket burglary. Burke and Nader, whom police had suspected of "safecracking" in the area, broke into the supermarket, encountered police, and ran. Police opened fire and killed Burke immediately. Nader returned police fire and was shot to death by police. Over 100 shots were fired in the exchange.
1957-02-23	Michael Burke (33)	Ohio (Forestville)	Burke was shot to death while running from police during an ambush of a supermarket burglary.
1956-07-02	Alfred Wilson	Ohio (Leavittsburg)	Wilson killed his two sisters-in-law and another woman in June 1956. He was sought by police for 11 days until a tip alerted them to his location. He refused to surrender when ordered to by police and was subsequently shot twice in the head by patrolman Russell Duffy.
1956-02-17	Armando Ibanez (40)	New York (Manhattan)	
1956-01-02	Leander Bennett (52)	Kansas City	
1955-08-28	Rollins, Charles Luther (44)	Michigan (Detroit)	Rollins was held under siege by over 200 police officers in the home of his nephew, Bernard Smith. After a tear gas bomb set the house on fire Rollins ran out firing a shotgun and was killed as ten officers fired over 40 shots at him. Smith later said of Rollins that "He read the Bible some, but mostly he rode a bicycle up and down the sidewalk when he wasn't working. He never talked to adults in the family. He only smiled."
1955-07-17	Charles Edward Porter (33)	Florida (Miami)	
1954-12-22	Cook, Robert (18)	Georgia (Albany)	
1954-12-12	Samuels, James (19)	Alabama (Tuscaloosa)	
1954-10-02	Woods, Tommie (78)	Texas (Columbus)	Tommie Woods, a Black elderly farmer, was killed by Sheriff J. O. Walker and Deputy Sheriff Ed Potter. While federal authorities concluded the killing of Woods was "wanton and unnecessary", the case was closed because the variation between eyewitness accounts "would prove to be too difficult to overcome if they prosecuted."
1954-09-07	Johnson, Ivey (47)	Georgia (Albany)	
1954-08-20	Rush, Eleanor	North Carolina (Raleigh)	
1954-08-01	Fullwood, Moses (54)	South Carolina (Lynchburg)	
1954-05-15	George Evans (35)	New York (Manhattan)	
1954-05-15	Willie Robinson (28)	New York (Manhattan)	
1954-04-24	Morrison, Leonard (28)	Texas (Fort Worth)	Leonard Morisson, a Black veteran, was killed by Fort Worth police after the police were called to settle a disturbance outside his home. Morrison was shot in the back and died in hospital three days later.
1954-04-18	Campbell, Canary	Florida (Tavares)	
1954-02-03	Warren, Shang (32)	Glorida (Coral Gables)	
1953-12-28	Jones, Moses	Alabama (Grove Hill)	
1953-12-16	Brice, Riley (54)	Georgia (Columbus)	
1953-12-09	Dunn, Johnny Gibbs (20)	Georgia (Jesup)	
1953-11-10	Bland, Sammie Lee	Mississippi (Grenada)	
1953-10-31	Carter, Memphis (35)	Texas (Longview)	
1953-10-31	Johnson, Robert	South Carolina (Florence)	
1953-10-17	Adams, Alfred (47)	Louisiana (New Orleans)	
1953-10-02	Fullilove, Creddie (26)	Mississippi (Yazoo City)	
1953-09-29	Mays, John	Georgia (Leslie)	
1953-08-01	Jones, Henry (22)	Georgia (Douglas)	
1953-06-14	Garrett, David (27)	Alabama (Birmingham)	
1953-05-25	Simmons, Rudolph	North Carolina (Coats)	
1953-05-21	Thomas, Henry	Florida (Lakeland)	
1953-04-29	Hobdy, Sylvester	Alabama (Selma)	
1953-04-25	McDuffie, Della (66)	Alabama (Alberta)	Della McDuffie, a Black housewife, was beaten to death by police in a cafe she owned with her husband. She used a wheelchair and was unable to escape. A year later, her husband was found dead under suspicious circumstances.
1953-04-11	Johnson, Earl	Tennessee (Memphis)	
1953-03-14	Donald "King" Werner (19)	New Jersey (Jersey City)	
1953-03-05	Holloway, Carlton	Alabama (Lafayette)	
1953-01-02	Chudick, Martin	North Carolina (Three Mile)	
1952-12-25	Jefferson, Emmett	Florida (Homestead)	
1952-11-12	Walton, Arthur Lee	Alabama (Bessemer)	
1952-11-06	Washington, Willie (54)	Alabama (Birmingham)	
1952-11-03	Noel, Carlyle (30)	Ohio (Columbus)	Noel was one of 1,600 prisoners rioting in an Ohio penitentiary. Twenty-one Ohio highway patrolmen were trapped inside the prison and opened fire with shotguns on a crowd of prisoners. Four, including Noel, were wounded, and Noel died of his wounds.
1952-10-30	Copeland, Esau	Georgia (Warm Springs)	
1952-10-25	Turner, Frank James	Mississippi (Clarksdale)	
1952-10-05	Gilder, Archie	Alabama (Birmingham)	
1952-08-23	Baldwin, Fred (37)	Florida (Chipley)	
1952-08-21	Thomas Murphy (22)	New York (Manhattan)	
1952-08-07	Tucker, John Henry (29)	Alabama (Birmingham)	
1952-07-21	Nelson, Eddie	Mississippi (Cleveland)	
1952-07-05	Carter, Rosa	South Carolina (Piedmont)	
1952-06-28	Kauffman, Gary F. (30)	California (Costa Mesa)	Kauffman abducted his own two-year-old son, another man, and the man's two-year-old son after shooting his estranged wife in the arm. He drove himself and his three hostages to his own house. When he was forced outside by tear gas, he attempted to flee in his car but was fired on by officers. When Kauffman returned fire he was shot to death by police, whose gunfire also wounded Kauffman's son in the head.
1952-05-17	Williams, Wallace (36)	Louisiana (Lake Charles)	
1952-04-11	Cousins, Howard	North Carolina (Henderson)	
1952-03-23	Vann, John Lester	Alabama (Birmingham)	
1952-03-05	White, John Watkin	Florida (Jacksonville)	
1952-03-02	Small, James	North Carolina (Washington)	
1952-02-26	Cobb, Robert Lee (32)	Mississippi (Billups)	
1952-02-20	Falkner, Tobe	Mississippi (Lawrence)	
1952-01-26	Smith, Earnest (36)	Alabama (Selma)	
1952-01-25	Thomas, William (54)	Alabama (Birmingham)	
1951-12-05	Johnson, Rufus	Georgia (Bainbridge)	
1951-11-18	Mitchell, John	Louisiana (Opelousas)	
1951-11-13	Roberto Carrasquillo (22)	New York (Manhattan)	
1951-11-13	Antonio Jose Soria (26)	New York (Manhattan)	
1951-11-06	Shepherd, Samuel (22)	Florida (Lake County)	Shot and killed by county sheriff Willis V. McCall while being transported from the Florida State Prison in Raiford. Shepherd was handcuffed to Walter Irvin. McCall claimed that the prisoners attacked him when he had to stop the car to change a flat tire, although Irvin's testimony and voluminous evidence made McCall's version implausible.
1951-07-04	Patterson, Tom	Alabama (Birmingham)	
1951-05-30	Goins, Dan (34)	Alabama (Russellville)	
1951-05-28	Kidd, Vernon (26)	Alabama (Binghamton)	
1951-05-04	Watson, Willie James (30)	Georgia (Valdosta)	
1951-04-29	Mosley, Willie Ruth (17)	Alabama (Gadsden)	Willie Ruth Moseley, a Black pregnant 17-year-old, was killed by police officer Floyd Vinyard, who was not prosecuted.
1951-03-26	Ford, Edward (43)	Alabama (Birmingham)	
1951-02-17	Jackson, Clifford	Florida (Riviera Beach)	
1951-02-11	Carter, Alfred	Alabama (Birmingham)	
1951-02-07	Dorsey, Levi (27)	Texas (Orange)	
1951-01-10	Jackson, Eddie	Alabama (Birmingham)	
1951-01-09	Joyner, Bobby Lee	North Carolina (La Grange)	
1951-01-08	Hood, Jessie	Alabama (Oakman)	
1950-12-24	Albert di Cristofano (30)	Ohio (Youngstown)	
1950-12-19	Perryman, Freddie (28)	Alabama (Birmingham)	
1950-12-09	Holmes, James (19)	Georgia (Brunswick)	
1950-11-05	Gregory, Joseph (26)	North Carolina (Oxford)	
1950-10-15	Harris, Eddie B. (41)	Alabama (Tallapoosa County)	
1950-09-30	Wynns, Moses (42)	South Carolina (Summerville)	
1950-09-15	Bendolph, Collin (27)	Alabama (Mobile)	
1950-09-09	Thompson, Solomon (22)	Alabama (Montgomery)	
1950-08-12	Brooks, Hilliard (22)	Alabama (Montgomery)	
1950-08-05	Robinson, James William (39)	Virginia (Wakefield)	
1950-07-26	Lawrence Feeney (19)	New York (Bronx)	
1950-07-23	Unnamed man (20)	New York (Manhattan)	
1950-07-01	Stinnett, John (40)	Tennessee (Dyer)	
1950-06-22	Langston, Robert (55)	Alabama (Pickensville)	
1950-06-22	Nash, Frank (22)	Alabama (Birmingham)	
1950-06-14	Best, Lorenza (35)	Alabama (Anniston)	
1950-05-14	Walker, Newt (41)	Louisiana (Mansfield)	
1950-03-24	Smith, Raymond (22)	Alabama (Birmingham)	
1950-03-18	Howard, Charlie Louis (26)	Alabama (Birmingham)	
1950-03-11	Collins, Arthur (37)	Alabama (Dothan)	Arthur Collins, a Black WWII veteran, was killed by Highway Patrol Sergeant W. A. Norris during a standoff with multiple police officers. Collins was possibly suffering from a mental illness and was allegedly threatening his family and neighborhood with a rifle.
1950-03-11	Boyd, Carter (35)	Texas (Houston)	
1950-02-21	Morgan, John (26)	Arkansas (Huttig)	
1950-02-18	Carlisle, Willie (18)	Alabama (Lafayette)	Willie Carlisle, a Black service station employee, was beaten to death by two police officers who accused him of letting the air out of a police car tire.
1950-02-13	Grier, Jessie (25)	Georgia (Reidsville)	
1950-02-09	Burt, Eugene (46)	Alabama (Birmingham)	
1950-02-04	Lewis, Charles Milton (34)	Florida (Auburndale)	
1950-01-22	Aaron, Buck (43)	Alabama (Bessemer)	
