= Oscar Ray Bolin =

Executed American serial killer

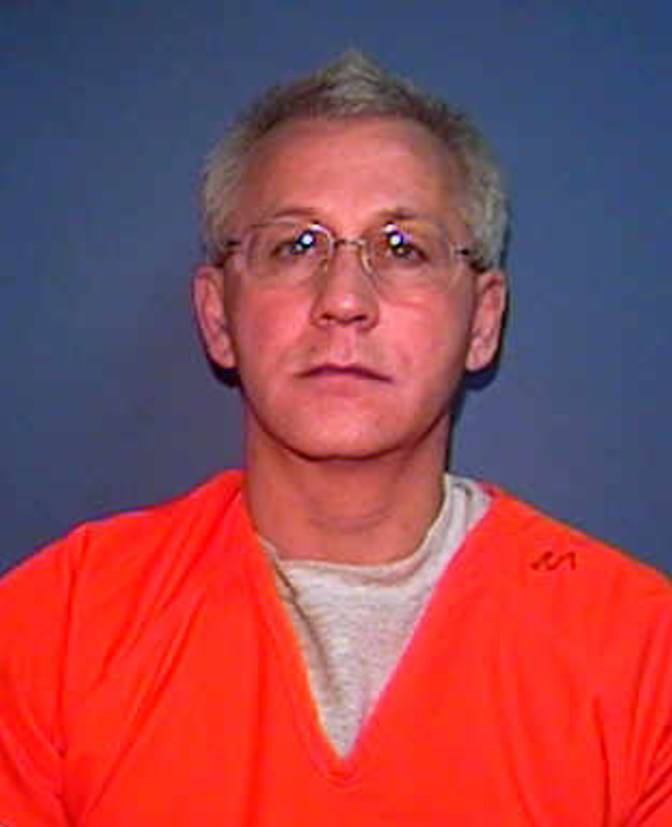
- Born: January 22, 1962; Portland, Indiana, U.S.
- Died: January 7, 2016 (aged 53); Florida State Prison, Raiford, Florida, U.S.
- Other name: Oscar Ray Bolin Jr
- Status: Executed by lethal injection
- Convictions: First degree murder (2 counts); Second degree murder; Rape
- Penalty: Death (July 1991)

Details
- Victims: Natalie Holley, Stephanie Collins, Teri Lynn Matthews, and Deborah Diane Stowe
- Span of crimes: 1986–1987
- Country: United States
- States: Florida, Texas, Ohio

Oscar Ray Bolin Jr. (January 22, 1962 – January 7, 2016) was an American serial killer and convicted rapist. In 1986, Bolin kidnapped and murdered three young women in Tampa, Florida. He was later connected to a fourth murder in Texas in 1987. The murders went unsolved for nearly four years, until the husband of his ex-wife called a tip line and implicated him. He maintained his innocence to the end. He was executed at the Florida State Prison in 2016 for murder.

== Early life ==
Bolin was born on January 22, 1962, in Portland, Indiana. His family consisted of laborers and carnival workers spread across multiple states including Florida, Indiana, Kentucky and Ohio. His father used to beat him when he was a child and his mother once walked him to a school bus stop on a leash.

Bolin frequently got into trouble with the law during his youth. In 1977, he committed theft in Ohio at the age of 15 and was arrested. He later moved to Florida in the early 1980s and began working as a carnival worker.

In 1982, his girlfriend, Cheryl Haffner, told authorities Bolin had kidnapped her and driven her around the Tampa Bay area for hours. He was arrested for false imprisonment, but the charge was dropped.

In 1983, the two were married in Hillsborough County, Florida.

== Murders ==
On January 25, 1986, 25-year-old Natalie Blanche Holley, a night manager at a Church's Fried Chicken restaurant in Tampa, finished work and locked up the store for the night with a colleague. She left the store around 1:30 a.m. and headed to her car. Her body was found hours later by a morning jogger. She had been stabbed to death.

On November 5, 1986, 17-year-old Stephanie Collins, a Chamberlain High School student, disappeared after finishing her shift at a drug store. On December 5, 1986, her body was found wrapped in sheets and towels. She had been stabbed to death and her skull was also crushed.

The same day Collins' body was found, 26-year-old Teri Lynn Matthews went missing. Her car was found outside a post office with the engine running. Her body was located later that day in some woods, wrapped in a white sheet. Her throat was cut and she had been bludgeoned.

== Investigation ==
In 1987, Bolin and two other men kidnapped and raped a 20-year-old waitress in Toledo, Ohio. Afterward, Bolin attempted to kill her with a gun, but the gun jammed. He released the woman along a highway in Pennsylvania. Bolin was captured and was sentenced to 22 to 75 years in prison.

In 1989, Haffner divorced Bolin and later remarried. She told her new husband that Bolin had told her about committing multiple murders. Haffner's new husband then called a tip line and implicated Bolin. More witnesses then came out to testify against him, including his younger half-brother and a cousin.

Haffner testified that she had been with Bolin before he kidnapped Holley and had helped him dispose of some evidence. Bolin's half-brother testified that he watched Bolin beat Matthews and attempt to drown her with a garden hose.

Bolin's cousin confessed to aiding Bolin in abducting 30-year-old Deborah Diane Stowe outside a convenience store in Greenville, Texas, in 1987. He testified that Bolin had raped and strangled the woman. Texas prosecutors declined to seek an indictment in the case because Bolin was already charged with multiple murders in Florida.

Bolin was found guilty and was sentenced to death in July 1991 for the murder of Holley. He was later sentenced to death again for the murder of Collins and received a third death sentence for the murder of Matthews.

== Execution ==
Bolin was interviewed by WTVT on the day before his execution. He continued to claim he was innocent and had been framed, and described his execution as a release from his punishment, having been locked up in prison for the past 28 years.

Bolin was executed by lethal injection at 10:16 p.m. EST on January 7, 2016. He was the first person to be executed in the United States in 2016. His last meal consisted of a rib-eye steak, a baked potato, salad, garlic bread, lemon meringue pie, and Coca-Cola. He declined to make a final statement. The next execution in Florida did not occur until over nineteen months later when Mark Asay was executed for the murders of two men in Jacksonville.

== See also ==
- List of people executed in Florida
- List of people executed in the United States in 2016
- List of serial killers in the United States

Executions carried out in Florida
Preceded by Jerry William Correll October 29, 2015	Oscar Ray Bolin; January 7, 2016	Succeeded by Mark James Asay August 24, 2017
Executions carried out in the United States
Preceded by Brian Keith Terrell – Georgia December 9, 2015	Oscar Ray Bolin – Florida; January 7, 2016	Succeeded by Richard Allen Masterson – Texas January 20, 2016
