= Trial of George Zimmerman =

2013 murder trial in Florida, United States

Florida v. Zimmerman
- Case Number 592012CF001083A
- Court: 18th Judicial Circuit in and for Seminole County, Florida
- Full case name: State of Florida v. George Zimmerman
- Submitted: April 11, 2012
- Decided: July 13, 2013
- Verdict: Not guilty
- Charge: Second-degree murder: Manslaughter (lesser included offense)

Court membership
- Judge sitting: Debra Nelson

Case opinions
- Decision by: Jury verdict

State of Florida v. George Zimmerman was a criminal prosecution of George Zimmerman on the charge of second-degree murder stemming from the killing of Trayvon Martin on February 26, 2012. On April 11, 2012, Zimmerman was charged with second-degree murder in the shooting death of Trayvon Martin, a black teenager. In support of the charges, the State filed an affidavit of probable cause, stating that Zimmerman profiled and confronted Martin and shot him to death while Martin was committing no crimes.

Florida State Attorney Angela Corey announced the charges against Zimmerman during a televised press conference and reported that Zimmerman was in custody after turning himself in to law enforcement. Zimmerman was injured during the encounter and said he shot Martin in self-defense. After 16 hours of deliberations over the course of two days, on July 13, 2013, a six-person jury rendered a not guilty verdict on both charges (including manslaughter).

== Prosecution attorneys ==
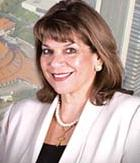
State Attorney Angela Corey was Special Prosecutor.

On March 22, 2012, Florida Governor Rick Scott announced his appointment of Angela Corey as the Special Prosecutor in the Martin investigation. She was the State Attorney for Duval, Clay and Nassau counties. When Corey took the case, she chose Bernie de la Rionda as lead prosecutor. De la Rionda was an Assistant State Attorney in Corey's office and had been a prosecutor for 29 years. Prosecutors John Guy and Richard Mantei assisted, with Guy making the opening statement. The prosecutor initially responsible for the case was Norm Wolfinger, a State Attorney whose jurisdiction included Seminole County where the shooting occurred on February 26, 2012. On March 22, 2012, he requested to be removed from the case to help "tone down the rhetoric" for the public good.

== Defense attorneys ==
On April 11, 2012, Mark M. O'Mara announced that he was the attorney representing Zimmerman. O'Mara is president of the Seminole County Bar Association, is a legal commentator for WKMG news, and had previously tried cases that involved the stand-your-ground law. When he took the case, O'Mara said that Zimmerman had no money and that the state may help pay the costs. When reporters asked why he took the case, O'Mara said, "That's what I do." On May 31, 2012, Orlando attorney Don West left his job as a federal public defender to join the defense team led by O'Mara. West specialized in murder cases and had been a board certified criminal trial specialist for 25 years. He and O'Mara had been friends for a long time.

== Pre-trial ==
After Seminole County Circuit Judge Jessica Recksiedler removed herself, Kenneth Lester Jr. took the case upon himself as its judge. At a pretrial hearing on April 12, Judge Mark Herr ruled that the affidavit was legally sufficient to establish probable cause. Court documents, including witness statements and other information, were sealed at the request of the defense team, and Zimmerman's arraignment was scheduled for May 29. Zimmerman took the witness stand at a bail hearing on April 20 and told the parents of Martin he was "sorry for the loss of your son". Zimmerman was released on a $150,000 bond and was fitted with an electronic monitoring device for monitoring his whereabouts in real-time. Zimmerman's attorney waived Zimmerman's right to appear at the arraignment and entered a not guilty plea on his behalf.

=== Zimmerman's bond revocation ===
In June 2012, Judge Lester revoked Zimmerman's bond and sent him back to jail after the prosecution alleged that Zimmerman and his wife had misled the court about their finances at an earlier bond hearing. Zimmerman's wife had testified at the hearing that they had very little money, and neither she nor Zimmerman revealed to the court that he had received $135,000 in donations. The prosecution alleged that recordings of telephone conversations Zimmerman had with his wife from jail showed that they had been speaking using a code about their finances, with repeated mentions of "Peter Pan" in apparent reference to a PayPal account. The judge charged Zimmerman's wife with perjury, and at a second bond hearing for Zimmerman held the following month, re-released Zimmerman with the new bond set at $1 million.

=== Removal of Judge Lester and assignment of Judge Nelson ===
Zimmerman's attorney, Mark O'Mara, filed a motion to disqualify Judge Lester, alleging that Lester had made disparaging and gratuitous remarks about his client in the July 2012 bond order. O'Mara said the judge's statement that he believed Zimmerman had misled the court at his first hearing was an indication of bias against Zimmerman and would impact Zimmerman's ability to get a fair trial. The state criticized the motion for citing "facts that are inaccurate, misleading and/or incomplete". When Judge Lester refused to recuse himself and ruled that the defense's motion was legally insufficient, the defense appealed. On August 29, 2012, the Fifth District Court of Appeal granted the petition for a new judge for the trial. Circuit Judge Debra Nelson was assigned to the case. Judge Debra S. Nelson of the 18th Circuit Court of Florida was the fourth judge to preside over the case. Nelson had been a judge for thirteen years, much of it handling criminal matters. Before becoming a judge she had worked in civil litigation.

=== Defense plans for pretrial immunity hearing ===
Under Florida law, the use of deadly force against an attacker is permissible in certain situations. The adoption of the Stand Your Ground law in 2005 modified the self-defense law so that a person who reasonably believes they must use deadly force to prevent serious injury to themself may lawfully do so without first attempting to retreat from an attacker; prosecution for using deadly force in such situations is prohibited. A defendant in a homicide case who claims to have acted in self-defense may petition the court to grant the defendant immunity from prosecution under these provisions of the law. Legal experts say that in a pretrial immunity hearing, the burden of proof is on the defendant to show from "a preponderance of the evidence" that they acted lawfully, whereas in a trial by jury the burden of proof is on the prosecution, who must show "beyond a reasonable doubt" (a much higher standard than required for establishing "a preponderance of the evidence") that the defendant acted unlawfully.

On August 9, 2012, Zimmerman's attorney, Mark O'Mara, announced that the defense team was planning to present their case to the judge at an immunity hearing before going to trial in order to request that the case be dismissed under the protection from prosecution provided for by the state's Stand Your Ground law. At a press conference held the following week, O'Mara said that "the facts don't seem to support a 'stand your ground' defense". He said that rather than seeking to have the charges dropped based on Stand Your Ground-law immunity, the defense team would ask at the pretrial hearing that the case be dismissed on the basis of immunity from prosecution provided for in traditional self-defense cases. In April 2013, on the advice of his attorneys, Zimmerman waived his right to a pretrial immunity hearing, and the court began preparations for the case to be tried by a jury. O'Mara would later say, after the trial had concluded, that he had not relied during the trial on the Stand Your Ground provision of the law because Zimmerman had not had an option of retreating. O'Mara would also say that he ultimately had not sought a pretrial immunity hearing because his case for defense would have been revealed during the hearing to the prosecution, which would have put the defense team at a disadvantage had the immunity request been denied and the case proceeded to trial.

== Discovery evidence ==
In May 2012, the defense received the first round of discovery evidence: 67 compact discs, a list of witnesses that included 50 possible law enforcement officers, 28 officers from the Sanford Police Department, 28 civilian witnesses, members of Martin's family, two of Zimmerman's friends and his father, Robert Zimmerman. Also listed as potential prosecution witnesses were technicians in biological and DNA evidence, trace evidence, gunshot residue, fingerprints and firearms, two FBI agents, and two audio technicians who analyzed the emergency calls made during the confrontation to determine who was heard screaming in the background. (Note: Audio technicians Tom Owen and Edward Primeau concluded that the screams were not Zimmerman's. James Ryan and Alan Reich, independent experts retained by The Washington Post, varied in their interpretations of the audio on the phone recordings.) Additional evidence released were audio and video recordings, photos, witness statements, forensic findings, Martin's autopsy report, evidence taken from Zimmerman after the shooting – his weapon, bullets, clothes, a DNA sample, medical records and his cell phone data.

In June 2012, the prosecution released recordings of two 911 calls placed by Martin's father the morning after the shooting. In the calls, Mr. Martin expressed worry that his son had not returned home, and inquired about filing a missing person report. Additional discovery released was a report containing the results of Zimmerman's voice stress test, and Zimmerman's account of the events and written statements. The defense also released audio and video recordings of Zimmerman's police interviews and re-enactment following the shooting. In July 2012, evidence released included: FBI interviews with people involved in the case, including Sanford police officers, family, friends and associates of Zimmerman. Also released were photos of Martin's bloodied sweatshirt and hoodie with a single bullet hole and several phone calls made by Zimmerman to Sanford police to report suspicious activity in the six months leading up to his encounter with Martin.

In August 2012, the State's 6th Supplemental Discovery included 76 pages containing the audio statement from witness 31, three photos taken by witness 13 at the scene showing the back of Zimmerman's head, a flashlight on the ground, the FDLE report with analyst's notes, emails from the Sanford Police Department, copies of Tracy Martin's 911 call reporting his son missing and Zimmerman's Seminole County Sheriff's Office Academy application. In September 2012, the DNA report on the gun used in the shooting was released with only Zimmerman's DNA being found on the gun, no trace of Martin's. (Note: See Florida Department of Law Enforcement, Laboratory Report, March 26, 2012.)

On October 19, Judge Nelson granted the defense's request for access to Martin's school records, cell phone records, and social media (such as Facebook and Twitter) posts. In her ruling, Nelson said that Zimmerman's attorneys needed to know whether Martin's school records and social media postings revealed any evidence that he had had violent tendencies. Martin's parents said the defense's request for school records and social media was a "fishing expedition" aimed at attacking their son and an attempt to assassinate his character. She also ruled that Zimmerman's medical records be provided to prosecutors. Nelson said she would review the medical records and decide whether anything should be withheld.

The defense additionally requested from ABC News and reporter Matt Gutman all recordings, notes and correspondence related to Witness Number 8, Martin's friend who said she was speaking with Martin by phone just before he was shot. O'Mara's motion stated the call lasted more than 26 minutes and the recording they received from the authorities was only 12 minutes and 44 seconds long. On December 3, 2012, defense attorney Mark O'Mara stated that he was "frustrated" that in the original discovery, a grainy black-and-white photo of Zimmerman had been substituted for the original color photo of Zimmerman's bloody nose. Criminal attorney David Wohl said the submission of the copy "borders on prosecutorial misconduct".

== Jury selection ==
On May 28, 2013, Judge Nelson denied a defense motion to delay the trial for six weeks. She also declined the prosecution's request to implement a gag order to keep the lawyers from discussing the details of the case in the media. On June 10, 2013, jury selection began with 100 prospective jurors filling out questionnaires. Five hundred people received summonses, and the process for picking a jury was expected to take two weeks. At the request of the defense, the judge agreed to establish an anonymous jury, where the identity of the jury would be revealed only to the prosecution and defense, but not released to the public or media. In the motion for the request, the defense said that "[jurors] may be subject to rebuke and possible retribution, should the verdict not comport with certain factions' desires in this matter."

In Florida, juries consist of 6 people; 12 jurors are required only for criminal trials involving capital cases, where the death penalty is applicable. Zimmerman's jury consisted of six members and four alternates. The population of Seminole County is 10 percent African American, a percentage which may differ from that of the 500-member pool of potential jurors. During the fourth day of jury selection, Judge Nelson announced that the jury would be sequestered during the trial, which was expected to take two to four weeks. On June 18, 2013, 40 potential jurors (16 men and 24 women) made it past the initial screening process.

The defense struck one potential juror, a female African American, as a "stealth juror" for failing to disclose that her pastor had advocated strongly on behalf of Trayvon Martin. The state attempted to strike one woman whose husband owned guns and who said she might have difficulty sending someone to prison. They also attempted to strike a woman who asked why Martin was out at night. The judge denied the strikes, and both women were part of the six person jury.

The prosecution struck one potential juror who was a black gun-owner who stated he watched Fox News. This particular prospective juror had been a defense favorite. On June 20, 2013, jury selection was completed. Six jurors and four alternates were selected. All six of the jurors were female, while two of the alternate jurors were male and two female. Five of the jurors were white; one was of mixed black and Mestizo ancestry. All of the alternates were white, and of those, one of the male alternates was said to have been white Hispanic. The jury was sworn in, and all remaining potential jurors were dismissed.

== Admissibility of evidence ==
Judge Nelson ruled that Martin's school records, history of marijuana use, fights, and photos and text from the teen's phone should not be mentioned during the trial. The judge did say that she might change her mind during the trial if the subjects become relevant. Zimmerman's attorneys had requested a Frye hearing regarding the admissibility of the testimony of the audio analysts, to determine if the methods used by them were generally accepted by the scientific community. At the time of the hearing, Florida used the Frye standard.

On June 22, 2013, Judge Nelson ruled that the audio experts would not be allowed to testify at Zimmerman's trial. The prosecution wanted to use voice experts that had been hired by lawyers and news organizations to analyze the 911 calls recorded during the confrontation to determine whether it was Martin or Zimmerman yelling for help. The experts arrived at mixed conclusions. The judge said in her ruling, "There is no evidence to establish that their scientific techniques have been tested and found reliable." Her ruling did not prevent the 911 calls from being played at trial. Additionally, over the course of the case Florida switched to the Daubert standard, effective July 1. The Daubert standard is a more modern standard that considers several factors (not just general acceptance in the scientific community) in determining admissibility of expert testimony.

On July 8, Judge Nelson ruled that the defense could tell the jury that Martin had a small amount of marijuana in his system at the time of his death. Assistant State Attorney John Guy argued that it was a backdoor attack on Martin's character, while defense attorney Don West argued that an expert would tell the jury that the amount was enough to create "some level of impairment". Although admissible, the defense ultimately did not present this information to the jury, and it was not put into evidence. On July 11, Special Prosecutor Angela Corey fired Ben Kruidbos, the information technology director for the State Attorney's office, for alleged misconduct and violations of "numerous state attorney's office policies and procedures." Kruidbos had alleged in a pre-trial hearing that the prosecutors had failed to provide full discovery to Zimmerman's defense team as required by law.

== Opening statements ==
On June 24, 2013, the prosecution delivered their thirty-minute opening statement. Prosecutor John Guy began by quoting remarks made by Zimmerman during the non-emergency call: "Fucking punks, these assholes always get away." The prosecution's statement focused on the lack of evidence of bodily harm to both Zimmerman and Martin, and portrayed Zimmerman as a liar who would be contradicted by witnesses and evidence. Guy also compared Zimmerman's and Martin's physical size, and commented on how small Martin was. The prosecution said Zimmerman was a "wannabe cop" who had participated in martial arts training, that he was looking for "people who didn't belong", and that he profiled Martin as "someone about to commit a crime in his neighborhood."

Don West made a lengthy opening statement for the defense, beginning with a knock-knock joke about jury selection. West stated that "there are no monsters" in the case, but that Zimmerman shot Martin "after being viciously attacked." West stated that Zimmerman was "sucker punched in the face, and had his head hammered against the ground." West played Zimmerman's non-emergency phone call twice, and used several visual aids to show jurors the location of various events in the case and to outline a timeline of the phone calls and events. West asserted that Martin had plenty of time to go home during the phone calls, but decided to confront Zimmerman. West attempted to reconstruct the shooting, using witness statements, crime scene photographs, and a discussion of Zimmerman's injuries that used photos. West then described Zimmerman's actions after the incident, and summarized witness and police statements and observations about Zimmerman's appearance and behavior. After the recess, West continued, pointing out that the gunshot was at contact range for Martin's sweatshirt, but several inches away from Martin's body, and said this proved that Martin was on top at the moment of the shot, with his shirt hanging down.

== Prosecution's case ==
=== Introductory ===
Chad Joseph, the 15-year-old son of Martin's father's girlfriend, was called by the state as the first witness and testified that he asked Martin to buy him Skittles; he did not go with Martin because he was playing a PS3 video game. Andrew Gaugh, who was the 7-Eleven clerk who sold Martin snacks, gave the next testimony; he said that Martin paid with cash, and he did not see anything suspicious about Martin's behavior.

Donald O'Brien, the HOA president, testified that Zimmerman and the neighborhood watch were not affiliated with the HOA. O'Brien said he felt that Zimmerman was the coordinator of the program because Zimmerman had taken the initiative to get the program started, and that the watch program had instructed participants not to follow suspects but call 911. He said he did not feel that the neighborhood needed a watch program. On cross-examination, he testified that the police did not do regular patrols of the area due to the lack of a written agreement between the HOA and the police department. O'Brian testified that construction workers in the neighborhood had followed a burglary suspect in the past, resulting in an arrest, and that he had sent out a congratulatory email. During several rounds of redirects he said "do not follow", as well as "follow at a safe distance".

=== Communicatory technicalities ===
Ramona Rumph from the Sheriff's communications office testified regarding how time stamps are applied in 911 calls. Rumph testified that 911 calls are initially coded as "routine" but can be upgraded, and that multiple calls can be linked together. Rumph testified as to the times of the various witness 911 calls. She testified about details of Zimmerman's prior 911 and non-emergency calls. The state then played several of his previous 911 and non-emergency calls for the jury. After the calls were played on cross-examination O'Mara asked Rumph about the results of these calls, and she testified that some had resulted in contacts with suspects. She could not comment on if the number of calls Zimmerman made was unusual.

Raymond MacDonald, an executive from T-Mobile, testified as to how cell phone records for calls and text-messages were collected and stored. MacDonald testified that billing records round the length of call up to the next highest minute, but that other records break calls to the second. MacDonald testified that on Martin's phone records, after a disconnected call at 7:26, all future incoming calls listed on the page went to voicemail. The records that broke to the second were only available for six months, so some records for the trial were rounded up to the minute. Greg McKinney, who worked for the company that ran the Retreat's security cameras, testified as to why the cameras near the front gate were not working at the time of the incident, and that security camera clocks may be off by as much as 18 minutes.

=== Police officers' testimonies ===
Sean Noffke, the dispatcher who was on the phone during Zimmerman's non-emergency call, testified regarding his own statements at that time. Noffke said that when he told Zimmerman, "We don't need you to do that", he was making a suggestion, not giving an order. He said that dispatchers do not give orders because of liability issues. During cross-examination, Noffke testified that Zimmerman did not seem angry during the call, and that he wanted the police to come to his location. Noffke also testified that he asked Zimmerman which way Martin was going, and that his question could be interpreted as a request to go and see which way he was going. He clarified his statement that dispatchers do not give orders but suggestions for the safety of the caller. He testified that Zimmerman's swearing and comments about Martin did not raise any particular concern, but under redirect said that Zimmerman's language could be interpreted as "hostile." The defense then asked if Noffke actually heard hostility, and he said "no". The defense asked about the statements regarding Martin's race and appearance, and Noffke testified that all of the discussion was for the purpose of identification of the suspect, and did not seem unusual.

Wendy Dorival was the Sanford police neighborhood watch coordinator who helped to form the "Retreat at Twin Lakes" neighborhood watch program. Dorival testified as to various roles and duties that volunteers had within the neighborhood watch program, and that watch participants were instructed not to follow or confront suspects, but only to call the police to report suspicious activity. She said that Zimmerman called to organize a watch program, and about 25 residents attended the meeting. Because Zimmerman told her he was selected as the coordinator by the HOA, she gave Zimmerman the watch coordinator handbook, which instructed watch participants not to confront suspects and that the watch was "not the vigilante police". On cross-examination, she testified that the community was worried about recent burglaries and that since the community was not walled in, nonresidents could enter and exit other than at the gates. Dorival testified that she attempted to recruit Zimmerman as a "Citizen on Patrol" but he refused. She testified that she did not give any instructions about watch participants not being allowed to carry a gun as watch members. She testified that people should err on the side of caution and make calls to police if they thought something might be suspicious, and categorized "walking in the rain without a purpose" as something that could be suspicious.

Anthony Raimondo, a sergeant with the Sanford police, was a responding officer to Zimmerman's non-emergency call and the shooting of Martin. He testified that it was raining at the time and the lighting at the scene was very poor, and that when he arrived other officers were already on the scene. He saw Martin face down with his hands underneath him. He was unable to find a pulse and attempted CPR, but Martin was declared dead. He then placed a plastic sheet over Martin's body out of respect and to preserve evidence from the rain. Diana Smith, the crime scene technician for the shooting and wife of Tim Smith, the first officer on the scene, testified regarding the scene. Using photos and computer reconstructions of the scene, she pointed out locations of all the objects in the scene, as well as described photographs of Martin's body. She further testified to the process she used to gather DNA evidence and photographs she took of Zimmerman at the station. On cross-examination, West asked her the methods she used to look for blood on the scene and the timing of the collection of evidence. She testified that items were swabbed for touch DNA, but that the item itself was not directly tested. She said that someone could touch an item but not leave sufficient cells for analysis, or those cells could be removed by later contact. West then asked Smith to identify injuries to Zimmerman she saw the night of the shooting, visible in the photographs she had taken several hours after the incident. On redirect, Guy clarified she had assistance looking for blood at the scene and that she did not see any blood at the scene, nor was she notified of blood by any of those that assisted her.

Sanford Police Department officer Ricardo Ayala was dispatched to the scene on a suspicious persons call that was later upgraded to "shots fired". Ayala testified that it was very dark and raining when he arrived, and Officer Smith (husband of Diana Smith, the crime scene technician) was holding Zimmerman at gunpoint at that time. Ayala then approached Martin, and he believed he was the first officer to do so. Ayala did not know if Martin was alive or not, and as Martin's hands were beneath his face-down body, he told him to "show me your hands". Ayala did not see any sounds, words, or motions from Martin. Ayala and officer Raimando attempted to perform CPR on Martin and moved his body in doing so. In cross-examination Ayala testified that holding Zimmerman was standard procedure in a "shots fired" call, and was not an indication of any risk from Zimmerman at that time. Ayala testified that Zimmerman was not confrontational and complied with all officer requests.

Stacy Livingston, an EMT and firefighter with the Sanford Fire Department, testified that Martin was unresponsive and had no pulse when she arrived on the scene. Livingston said Martin was pronounced dead at 7:30 p.m. the night of the shooting. She also testified that she treated Zimmerman at the scene and that he had a swollen, bleeding nose and two cuts on the back of his head. When O'Mara asked if Zimmerman should have been concerned with his medical well-being because of his injuries, Livingston said, "Possibly." Sanford Police Department officer Timothy Smith was the first officer on the scene. Smith testified that when he saw Zimmerman after the shooting, his backside was wet and had grass blades on it. He also saw several injuries on Zimmerman, which included contusions, lacerations, and a bloody nose. Smith said that after Zimmerman had his gun taken away and was handcuffed, he told Smith that "he was yelling for help and nobody would come help him." Smith also testified that Zimmerman said he was "lightheaded" during the drive to the police station but declined to go to a hospital.

Sanford Police Department officer Doris Singleton assisted with the investigation of the incident and conducted interviews with Zimmerman at the police department on the night of the shooting. Singleton recorded her interview with Zimmerman after reading Zimmerman his Miranda rights. Singleton testified that during her interview with Zimmerman, he told her that his neighborhood was dealing with an increase in burglaries, and he started a neighborhood watch program. He told her that he had previously called the police on suspicious people, but often they were not stopped. Zimmerman told Singleton that while in his car, he saw Martin walking in the neighborhood in the rain. Zimmerman said he called police and pulled over before Martin started circling his car and then walked off. Zimmerman also told Singleton that he got out of his car to find a street sign and to see where Martin was going. Zimmerman said in the interview that he was walking back to his car when Martin jumped out from the bushes and said to him, "What the fuck is your problem, homie?" Zimmerman said he got his cell phone out to call 911, and he told Martin, "I don't have a problem." Martin then said to him, "No, now you have a problem." Singleton testified that Zimmerman told her that Martin then punched him and was banging his head into the concrete. Zimmerman also said that within seconds, Martin's hand was moving down his body toward his gun, and fearing for his life, he shot Martin. Singleton testified that during her interview with him, Zimmerman did not appear angry or spiteful toward Martin.

Sanford Police Department officer Christopher Serino was the lead investigator for the incident. Recordings of Serino's interviews with Zimmerman were played for the jury, as well as the reenactment that Zimmerman performed with Serino. On direct examination, Serino testified that Zimmerman said Martin came out and punched him and told him he was going to kill him. Serino said there was evidence to suggest that Zimmerman was still following Martin after the non-emergency dispatcher suggested that he not do so. Serino said red flags were raised for him when Zimmerman did not know the names of the streets in his neighborhood, although there are only three. Serino testified that he felt Zimmerman exaggerated the number of times he was hit that night but said he did not feel any "active deception" on Zimmerman's part when he said he got out of his vehicle to follow Martin to see what street he was on. Serino also testified that no major discrepancies came to his mind about the varying accounts given by Zimmerman at different times or with other witness accounts. Under cross-examination Serino testified that Zimmerman did not seem "cagey" or to be sidestepping questions. When O'Mara asked Serino if he thought Zimmerman was telling the truth, Serino said yes. Judge Nelson ruled that this answer to O'Mara's question was an improper statement made by the witness about Zimmerman's credibility, and the jurors were to dismiss Serino's testimony in regards to the question and his answer. On redirect, the prosecutor asked Serino, "If I were to believe that somebody was committing a crime, could that not be profiling that person?" Serino said it could be construed as such, yes. De La Rionda also asked Serino if there was any evidence that Martin was committing a crime that evening or any evidence that Martin was armed. Serino answered no. The prosecutor also questioned Serino about the language Zimmerman used in his call to police when Zimmerman said, "These fucking punks always get away." De La Rionda asked, "Is that something you would use in reference to somebody that you're going to invite over to dinner?" Serino, said "No, sir, I would not." He also asked him if he thought it was a friendly comment. Serino again answered, "No, sir, it does not." Serino also testified that calling someone "fucking punks" is ill will and spite.

=== Experts' data analyses ===
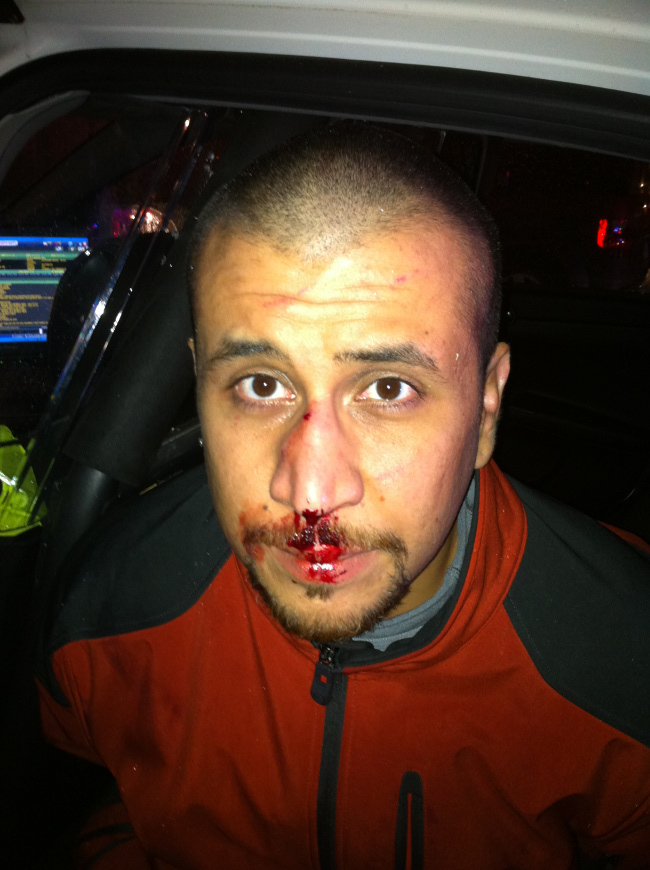
Image taken of Zimmerman's injuries after the shooting

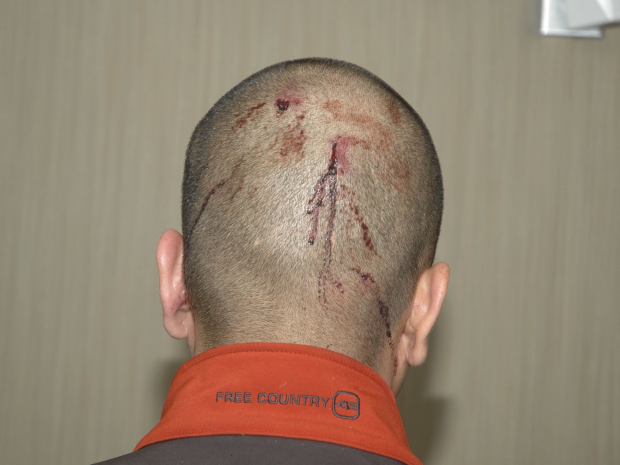
Image taken of Zimmerman's injuries after the shooting

Dr. Shipping Bao, the associate medical examiner who performed the autopsy on Martin, testified that he did not die immediately and that his heart was still beating after being shot. Bao said Martin was shot from intermediate range, which he defined as between 0.4 inches and 4 feet, and said the muzzle had loose contact with Martin's clothing. Bao also testified that he did not believe that Martin could have moved after being shot. Dr. Bao stated that Martin was 5 feet 11 inches and 158 pounds when he died, was healthy at the time of the shooting, and had a small abrasion on his fourth and fifth left fingers. Bao also said that the knees of Martin's pants were stained.

Dr. Valerie Rao, a medical examiner who reviewed video and photographs of Zimmerman's injuries, testified that she thought Zimmerman's wounds were "insignificant" and "non-life threatening." She said that Zimmerman's head might have only hit the concrete a single time and the injuries were so minor that they were not consistent with grave force. Anthony Gorgone, a crime lab analyst with the Florida Department of Law Enforcement, testified that he found no traces of Zimmerman's DNA in scrapings taken from Martin's fingernails. Gorgone said he did find both Zimmerman's and Martin's DNA on the gray sweatshirt Martin was wearing, and both of their DNA was found on Zimmerman's jacket. Gorgone said Zimmerman's DNA was found on the grip of his gun, but that Martin's was not found.

Hirotaka Nakasone, a voice analysis expert, was called by the state after previously being called by the defense during the Frye hearing. Nakasone testified that the recordings of the screams on the 911 calls were of poor quality due to the distance from the phone and compression introduced by the cell phone. He found 45 seconds of recording between the start of the screaming until the gunshot. Approximately 19 seconds was actual screaming, of which 3.5 seconds were able to be isolated for analysis. He testified that it was not possible to do voice analysis on this data as it was "not fit for the purpose of voice comparison", which generally requires 30 seconds for analysis. He further testified that doing age estimation by listening or pitch analysis has a high margin of error. Nakasone testified that someone who is familiar with voices can recognize those voices and identify them more easily than someone unfamiliar with the voices. Nakasone testified that for these samples, someone who had heard a person in a variety of situations speaking, uttering, and screaming in a similar situation could be better able to recognize the speaker. On cross-examination, Nakasone testified that there could be significant listener bias which could impact the reliability of "familiar voice recognition", introduced by having multiple people attempting to identify a voice together. Nakasone testified that the same word repeated is generally unsuitable for analysis, because there is not a sufficient number of the phonemes which can be used to identify the voice. Nakasone said that the screams were made under "extreme duress" and in a "life-threatening situation", and that due to physiological changes during life-threatening screams, any analysis using such screaming was not possible. Nakasone also testified that using screams like this for age estimation would be "very very challenging" and that it would generally not be attempted.

=== Neighbors' testimonies ===
Selene Bahadoor was a resident of the Retreat at Twin Lakes who worked in IT for a hospital. She was at home with relatives and friends on the night of the shooting. She testified that she heard noises outside, moving from the south (left) towards the north (right) towards the top of the T (where two sidewalks met). She went to her window and did not see anything, but moved to her sliding glass door and saw "figures and arms flailing" and that two people appeared to be standing, but it was too dark to identify them or their clothes. She said she heard something that sounded like "No" and then went back to her kitchen to turn off the stove, heard a shot, and then returned to the sliding door. At that time she saw someone lying in the grass face down. She saw several neighbors also looking at the scene, and then the police, but did not go outside. Bahadoor testified that she had previously known Zimmerman as a neighborhood watch person. On cross-examination by O'Mara, Bahadoor testified that she discussed her testimony with the police and did not recall if she had said the noise moved from south to north during her initial interview with Chris Serino or FDLE. When presented with her transcripts from those interviews, the transcripts said only "running" but not the direction. She testified that she had mentioned the left to right (south to north) motion to her sister. She "liked" the Justice4Trayvon Facebook page and signed the Change.org petition, but said she has sympathy for both families. She reiterated that it was too dark to see which participant was which, or what positions they were in. On redirect, she said she had not been asked about the direction of movement previously, and had not come forward earlier because she did not want to be in the public eye. On re-cross, she said that she had done an interview for national television, but that it did not air.

Jayne Surdyka was a neighbor in the Retreat who was in her upstairs bedroom at the time of the incident. She went to close her window due to the "pouring down rain", when she heard a loud "dominant" voice. She reopened the window to see into the courtyard and heard a voice that sounded "angry, very agitated" but that she could not hear words. She shut off her lights to reduce glare and see better, and saw two men on the ground one on top of the other. She heard a cry for help that she thought was made by "the boy" and then heard "pop, pop, pop". She saw one of the men get up and hold his head while the other stayed on the ground face down. Surdyka's 911 call was then played.

Surdyka's call to 911
911 call, February 26, 2012

On cross-examination, the defense asked about the cries for help that she heard, and she confirmed she heard only two cries: one for help, and then a "yelp" just before the gunshot. West asked her if she had heard the other 911 calls and cries for help previously. West asked her if "the loud voice could have been someone on a cell phone in the wind", and she replied, "I guess". She clarified that there was five to ten minutes between the initial "loud voice" and the later argument and fight; she assumed they were the same voice. She said that during the argument the "loud" voice initiated and a "meek" voice replied. She commented that when the porch lights were off it was "pitch black" in the yard, but that she could see well enough to see that the person on top was wearing a dark or black shirt or jacket. West asked her to reconcile Martin's chest wound with her testimony that Zimmerman stood up from on top, with Martin underneath him, face down. West pressed her to admit that she assumed which voice was which, but she replied that she felt the aggressive voice was "a man's" and that the other voice was higher pitched and she felt that it was "a boy's".

Jeannee Manalo was with her family watching TV in the living room at her home in the Retreat at the time of the incident. Manalo said she heard a "howling" sound and looked out the sliding door, but was unable to see anything due to the darkness. Later, she heard a yelling that she thought was "help". She looked out and could not see anything, but heard struggling. After hearing "help", she returned to watching TV, and then only looked out again after hearing the gunshot. She then looked out again and saw two people on the grass, with a neighbor outside with them who was asking if he should call 911. Manalo testified that she did not notice the size at the time, but after seeing the news, she believes Zimmerman was on top. Manalo could not tell which person was screaming for help. After she heard the shot, she looked out again. Her husband went outside and then returned to get a plastic Walmart bag to be used for CPR. On cross-examination, she said that noises seemed to move closer over the incident, moving from the top of the "T" slightly further south. West questioned Manalo about differences between her current recollections and the statements she made during investigator interviews at the time. In her earlier statements, Manalo did not describe the sizes of the individuals or compare them. West asked about seeing Zimmerman after the incident and referred to a photo of his injuries, but Manalo replied that she did not get a good look at his face that night. West asked what photos she used to develop her understanding of the relative sizes of Martin and Zimmerman. She testified that she had seen full body photos of Zimmerman from the police station, and the "hoodie", "hollister", and "football" shots of Martin. She had not seen photos of Martin from the 7-Eleven surveillance video. She stated she did not look at photos of Zimmerman's injuries, including one taken by her husband, until later. Manolo testified that she might be wrong on the size comparison, and that "I don't know who's bigger now". She later testified that her opinion of the relative sizes of Martin and Zimmerman the night of the incident was based on old photographs of Martin. After several rounds of questioning, she said her opinion of the sizes was based on the photographs, but that the person who was on top got up.

Jennifer Lauer worked in real estate and was living in the Retreat at Twin lakes at the time of the incident. Lauer testified that she was in her living room watching Celebrity Apprentice on the television with the volume up "pretty high". Lauer testified that she did not see anything, due to her blinds being closed, and that her statements were based on what she heard. She heard voices in her backyard; she was unable to make out any words or tell how many people were talking, but she assumed it was two people due to the pattern. She said the sounds were coming from the left (north) outside her window. Lauer testified that both voices were about the same volume and were "flustered" instead of "confrontational". Lauer then muted the TV and then immediately began to hear scuffling ("like playing basketball on pavement"), and the sound of shoes on pavement and grass. Lauer said she then heard "grunting" and "wrestling", or rolling in the grass, that was getting closer. Lauer said the grunting gradually turned into "yelping". Lauer and her husband called 911 about thirty seconds after she initially muted the TV. Lauer moved away from the window so that her call could not be heard outside, and while on the call, Lauer testified that she heard cries for help and a gunshot. Lauer testified that there was only one voice yelling for help, but that she could not identify who it was, and that the cries for help stopped at the gunshot. Lauer and her husband (then fiancé) then went upstairs for safety and did not look out the window. Lauer testified that she heard her neighbor, John Good, outside saying something like, "What is going on" while the yelling continued. She testified that she did not hear anyone say, "You are going to die motherfucker" or anything similar. Lauer's call to 911 was played for the jury.

Lauer's call to 911
911 call, February 26, 2012

After her call, Lauer heard talking outside and someone saying, "Take my gun". She testified that while walking in front of her house, the address numbers on her house are visible from the sidewalk, but might be blocked depending on where you were standing on the walk. She also said that there were only 3 streets within the community. Lauer testified that she knew of Zimmerman from her role on the HOA board, but that she never formally met him. She was slightly aware of the neighborhood watch and that Zimmerman was involved, but did not know details. Lauer testified she could not identify the yells as Zimmerman's because she had not heard him yell in the meetings. On cross-examination, O'Mara clarified that the first thing that captured her attention was loud talking near the T, that was a back and forth discussion, but she could not make out words. Specifically she said she did not hear anyone say, "What are you following me for" or "What are you doing here?" Lauer testified that the cries for help or yelping had started before her 911 call began. She said that her ability to hear the yells in person was better than the ability to hear them on the 911 recordings. Lauer said the person yelling for help "was in danger", and "needed help".

Jonathan (John) Good, a neighbor at the retreat, testified that he heard a faint noise outside but could not tell the direction. As the noises grew louder, he looked outside through his blinds. He opened his door and looked out and saw "some sort of tussle" where the participants were on the ground. He called out, "What's going on?" and "Stop it" as he started to step outside. Good said the participant wearing "dark or black" was on top and the person wearing "red or white" was on the bottom, and the person on the bottom had lighter skin. He described the person on top having their legs straddling the person on the bottom, who was face up. He could not hear any pounding or hitting, but did see "downward arm motion, multiple times" that "looked like punches" from the person on top. He heard a "help" from the person on the bottom, and Good said, "Cut it out" and that he was going to call 911. He went back inside to call 911, but he heard a gunshot before the call was completed. Good's call to 911 was played for the jury.

Good's call to 911
911 call, February 26, 2012

Good testified that his statement in earlier interviews of "MMA-style" was in reference to the person on top straddling the person on the bottom and striking them. He testified he did not see the person on top slamming the person on bottom's body or head into the concrete. He said the recorded calls for help from the other's 911 calls did not sound the same as the cries for help he heard. On cross-examination he stated that he could not be sure that additional hitting or head pounding was not happening; he just did not see well enough to say that it did happen. Using photographs of Zimmerman and Martin from that night, he identified Martin as the person on top, and Zimmerman as the person on the bottom. Defense attorney West had Good go over a sketch of the scene and positions of the participants that he had made shortly after the incident. Between the time Good was initially outside and when his 911 call began, he went upstairs and down a hallway to get his phone, at which time he looked out a window and saw Martin's body on the ground. Good stated that in his opinion it was Zimmerman's voice screaming for help.

Jonathan Manalo, whose wife testified earlier, told the jury he was the first person to make contact with Zimmerman after the shooting. Manalo said that Zimmerman was calm and easy to understand before police arrived. Manalo said as soon as he saw Zimmerman, he started explaining what happened. Manalo testified that Zimmerman told him that he was defending himself when he shot Martin. Manalo also testified that after police arrived, Zimmerman asked him to call his wife and "tell her I shot someone."

=== Rachel Jeantel's testimony ===
Rachel Jeantel, Witness No. 8, was a friend of Martin's in elementary school and high school. Jeantel testified that she was on the phone with Martin during the incident and that they were on the phone together while Martin was at the 7-Eleven. The call was disconnected and Martin later called her back. Jeantel testified that during the second call, Martin said a man was watching him, but that she did not think it was a "big idea." Jeantel asked Martin how the man looked and he told her that he was "a creepy-ass cracker." Jeantel warned Martin to walk away because "it might be a rapist." Martin, she said, told her that the "nigga is still following me" so he was going to try to "lose him" and get back to the home where he was staying. As Jeantel remained on the phone with Martin, he said, "The nigga is behind me." The man who was allegedly following him reappeared and Martin said, "Why are you following me for", and then Jeantel heard a hard-breathed man come and say, "What are you doing around here?" Jeantel testified that she said, "Trayvon, Trayvon" and she "started to hear a little bit of Trayvon saying, get off, get off." Jeantel then said she heard Martin's phone headset fall and Martin say, "Get off." The phone went dead and Jeantel said she did not speak to Martin again. Jeantel also testified that she believed the screams heard on the 911 call were Martin's, because "Trayvon has kind of a baby voice."

On cross-examination by defense attorney Don West, Jeantel testified that she had lied about her reasons for not going to Martin's funeral and said the reason she did not go was because she felt guilty and did not want to see the body. West asked her why she did not call police after the phone went dead. Jeantel said, "I thought he was going to be OK because he was right by his daddy's house." West also asked her about the last thing she had heard, which was "something hitting somebody." Jeantel told West that "Trayvon got hit", and West then asked her, "You don't know that, do you?" Jeantel testified, "No sir." West also questioned her about the term "creepy ass cracker". West asked her, "Do people that you live around and with call white people 'creepy ass crackers'?" Jeantel said, "Not creepy, but cracker, yeah." West then asked her if she was saying that people in her community and culture that she lived in called white people crackers. Jeantel testified, "Yes, sir." West also asked her if she thought the term was a racial comment and offensive. Jeantel said she did not believe "creepy ass cracker" was a racial comment and said, "No", it was not offensive. She also testified that the reference to cracker referred to "a pervert." Jeantel said she never told anyone about Martin saying that term until a year after the shooting.

Zimmerman's defense attorney asked her if Martin had perhaps lied to her because he did not want her to know if he decided to assault Zimmerman that night. Jeantel testified, "That's real retarded, sir. That's real retarded to do that, sir. Why on earth – Trayvon did not know." During the trial, a letter to Sybrina Fulton, Trayvon's mother, was presented as evidence. The letter outlined what was supposedly overheard on a phone call in the moments before the fight between Martin and Zimmerman broke out. It was written in cursive and signed with the printed name "Diamond Eugene." Jeantel claimed the letter was from her, prepared with the help of a friend; however, when asked on the stand if she was able to read the letter to verify its contents, Jeantel admitted, "I don't read cursive." Jeantel claimed that the name "Diamond Eugene" was her nickname. In December 2019, Zimmerman filed a lawsuit claiming that Jeantel bore false testimony in place of her half-sister Brittany Diamond Eugene, who the lawsuit claims was Martin's real girlfriend at the time of Travyon's death. The lawsuit was dismissed.

== Defense's case ==
On July 5, the defense began presenting their case to the jury.

=== Testimony ===
Gladys Zimmerman, Zimmerman's mother, was the first defense witness to take the stand. After listening to the 911 call, O'Mara asked her whose voice was in the background, She testified "That's my son, George." She also stated, "That way he is screaming, it describes to me anguish, fear. I would say terror." On cross examination, Bernie de la Rionda asked Zimmerman's mother if she had ever heard her son screaming before. She testified "Not for help" but was "sure that is George's voice."

Sondra Osterman, wife of Zimmerman's friend Mark Osterman, testified that the voice screaming for help on the 911 tape was "definitely" that of Zimmerman. She stated, "Yes, definitely, it's Georgie, I hear it, I hear him screaming." Osterman also said that she had known Zimmerman since 2006, when they worked together at a mortgage company. When questioned about her husband's book that he wrote about the shooting, she stated that it had not affected her testimony in the case. She testified that "I wouldn't lie for him or for anybody." She also testified she did not think Zimmerman's use of an expletive on the 911 call indicated any ill-will or hatred on his behalf. She stated, "I don't think he was angry."

Mark Osterman, a friend of Zimmerman and federal air marshal, testified that he heard Zimmerman screaming in the background of the 911 call. He stated, "It sounded like George." He also testified that he had discussed gun safety with Zimmerman and took him to a gun range. Osterman said that Zimmerman was "very safe all the time" with his handgun. When questioned about the gun Zimmerman owned, (Note: At the time of the incident, Zimmerman owned a black Kel-Tec PF-9, 9mm semi-automatic pistol.) Osterman stated, "It's a reliable firearm", and also said that he had recommended to Zimmerman that he keep a round chambered in the weapon. During cross-examination by Bernie de la Rionda, Osterman said he was unsure how many copies his book, Defending our Friend; the Most Hated Man in America, had sold and stated that all proceeds would go for Zimmerman.

Geri Russo, a friend of Zimmerman's who had previously worked with him, testified that it was Zimmerman screaming for help on the 911 tape. She testified, "I recognize his voice, I've heard him speak many times, I have no doubt in my mind that's his voice." Leanne Benjamin and John Donnelly, friends of Zimmerman who are husband and wife, testified separately that it was Zimmerman screaming for help on the 911 tape. Benjamin testified that she had formerly worked with him and stated, "I know his voice, I know what his voice sounds like when he gets excited or loud." Donnelly testified that he had found it "distressing" to listen to the 911 tape due to his combat experience in Vietnam and said, "There is absolutely no doubt in my mind that is George Zimmerman and I wish to God I didn't have the ability to understand that." Donnelly also testified that he contributed money to Zimmerman's defense fund and purchased some suits for Zimmerman to wear at his trial.

Jorge Meza, Zimmerman's uncle, a former U.S. Army Command Sergeant Major, and currently employed by the Orange County Sheriff's Office, testified that he had known Zimmerman since "Oct. 5, 1983. The day he was born." Meza said he had been working on his computer last year when he heard Zimmerman's voice being broadcast on a news report that his wife was watching on television. Meza testified he instantly recognized the voice, and said he hadn't been watching the television news report with his wife, and that she had not told him it was about his nephew. Meza testified about the voice he had heard, saying that: "It is the unique way you recognize your family member when they laugh, when they cry, this was the moment I recognized it was George screaming for help. That voice just came and hit me." He also testified that "It hit me the way I heard that, but more than heard that, I felt it inside of my heart. I said, That's George."

Adam Pollock, owner of a kickboxing gym where Zimmerman had previously trained, testified that Zimmerman was "grossly obese", and not athletic at all. Pollock also testified that "He was an overweight, large man when he came to us, a very pleasant, very nice man, but physically soft and predominantly fat, not a lot of muscle, not a lot of strength." He also testified that Zimmerman came to the gym to lose weight and get in shape. Pollock was asked to demonstrate for the jury what the mixed-martial arts fighting method known as ground-and-pound was, and showed the jury by straddling O'Mara on the floor of the courtroom.

Olivia Bertalan, a former neighbor of Zimmerman's from The Retreat at Twin Lakes, testified that she was the victim of a home invasion in the gated community. Bertalan said that she hid in her son's bedroom as two teenagers broke into her home. After the robbery, she said that Zimmerman had come over to her house and offered her a lock for her sliding glass door. Bertalan also testified that Zimmerman told her that she could go spend time with his wife if she felt too scared to be home alone during the day. She estimated that she had discussed the robbery with Zimmerman about 20 times after it happened.

=== 911 call ===
Chris Serino testified that Martin's father, Tracy Martin, indicated to him the voice heard screaming in the 911 call did not sound like his son's. Serino testified that he played the 911 call for Tracy Martin in the Sanford Police Department a few days after February 26, 2012. Serino said that after Martin listened to the call, he became "emotional". Serino also testified that he asked Martin whether or not the voice screaming on the 911 call sounded like his son's. He said Martin's response was more of a "verbal and a non-verbal", and that "He looked away and under his breath, as I interpreted it, said no." During cross examination, Bernie de la Rionda suggested to Serino that Tracy Martin may have been in denial about his son's death and that's why he uttered "no." Serino responded, "It could be perceived as denial."

Doris Singleton, who was a witness to the meeting at the police station between Serino and Tracy Martin testified, "I don't know his exact words, but Tracy Martin was telling Chris it was not his son's voice. He was very upset, he was very sad, he hung his head, he cried." Singleton also testified that she became "choked up" while watching Martin listen to the tape. Tracy Martin testified that during his meeting with Serino to listen to the 911 call, he never told him he did not recognize his son's voice. Martin testified that he was unsure and said "I can't tell." Martin said that after he had listened to the 911 call at least 20 times at the Sanford mayor's office, he was sure it was his son's voice.

Sanford City Manager Norton Bonaparte, testified about inviting the family of Trayvon Martin to listen to the 911 call prior to the call being released to the public and media. Bonaparte said the mayor was also present for the meeting at city hall and law enforcement officials were requested not to attend. Bonaparte also testified he played the 911 tapes as a courtesy for the Martin family before they were released publicly. Bonaparte said that during the playing of the tape that none of the family members' reactions were recorded.

Bill Lee, former Sanford police chief, testified that he recommended the tape of the 911 call be played for Martin's family individually, rather than in a group, to avoid any improper influences. Lee said that he had offered to be in the room when the 911 tape was played, but the city manager declined to have him or other police officials present. Lee stated that it was rare for the mayor and city manager to become involved in police investigations. The former police chief also testified "the evidence in testimony gave us an indication who was screaming on the tape."

=== Experts' analyses ===
Dr. Vincent Di Maio, a forensic pathologist and gunshot wound expert, testified that Martin's gunshot wound was consistent with Zimmerman's story that Martin was on top of him and leaning over him when he was shot. The gunshot evidence indicated that Martin's clothing was from two to four inches from his body when he was shot, Di Maio said, "If you lean over someone, you notice the clothing tends to fall away from the chest, if instead you're lying on your back and someone shoots you, the clothing is going to be against your chest." Di Maio said he had examined photographs and the autopsy and toxicology reports and concluded that the evidence was consistent with Zimmerman's statements to police. Di Maio testified the path of the bullet ran from Martin's left side through part of his heart and into a portion of the right lung. Di Maio stated, "The medical evidence...is consistent with his [Zimmerman's] statement." Di Maio also testified that Zimmerman had at least six injuries from the struggle: two head lacerations, two wounds to his temples and wounds on his nose and forehead. Di Maio said those injuries were consistent with Zimmerman having his head banged into a sidewalk, and that such injuries can be dangerous. Di Maio stated it's possible to receive trauma without visible wounds, testifying that, "You can get severe trauma to the head without external injuries, actually." Di Maio said Zimmerman's nose may have been fractured, which was consistent with Zimmerman being punched in the nose.

The pathologist testified that Martin lived no more than three minutes after the shooting and probably was conscious for at least 10 to 15 seconds. Di Maio said that someone may be able to move their arms after receiving a similar gunshot. Di Maio also testified that if clothes taken into evidence are wet and packaged in plastic bags, and not paper bags, it can ruin the samples since "bacteria multiplies and you get mold and it stinks to high heaven." Dennis Root, a former police officer with training in firearms and self-defense and a use-of-force expert, testified the fight between Zimmerman and Martin went on for some 40 seconds and was marked by a high level of fear and anxiety. Root said "That's a very long time to be involved in any type of physical altercation." Root further stated that "If you have not successfully completed the fight, if you have not won the fight in 30 seconds, change tactics, because the tactics you are using are not working."

=== Resting ===
Zimmerman's defense offered their last witness, Zimmerman's father, Robert Zimmerman, who testified that he believes it was his son who was screaming on the 911 tape. George Zimmerman was then questioned by the judge about testifying in his own defense and he stated, "After consulting with counsel, [I've decided] not to testify, your honor." The defense rested its case on Wednesday, July 10.

== Motions to acquit ==
After the prosecution rested its case, the defense made a motion to acquit, arguing that the prosecution had not provided sufficient evidence to prove murder beyond a reasonable doubt. After hearing arguments from both sides, the motion was denied by the judge.

=== Second motion to acquit ===
After the defense rested its case, a second motion for acquittal was made, with the defense asking the state to provide their narrative of the event, which precluded a self-defense situation. The judge ruled that there was sufficient evidence for the case to proceed to the jury.

== Closing arguments ==
=== Prosecution's argument ===
State Attorney Bernie de la Rionda opened his closing argument on Friday, July 12 by telling the jurors that "a teenager is dead through no fault of his own" because Zimmerman had made assumptions about Martin and acted on them. Rionda stated to the jury that Zimmerman profiled Martin as a criminal and assumed certain things, that Martin was up to no good, and that's what led to Martin's death. De la Rionda argued that Zimmerman took the law into his own hands, accusing Zimmerman of following Martin because Zimmerman wanted to be a policeman and take down someone whom he "profiled" as a criminal. The prosecutor also focused in on inconsistencies in Zimmerman's statements, calling the defendant a "liar".

=== Defense's argument ===
Mark O'Mara began his closing arguments by asking the jurors to use common sense when considering the evidence in the confrontation between Zimmerman and Martin. O'Mara argued to the jury to not "fill in the gaps" or to "connect the dots", but to stick to the facts while considering their verdict. O'Mara told the jury that you can't help but have a first impression and "what you have to do is be vigilant, diligent when deciding this case." O'Mara said that Zimmerman is "not guilty of anything but protecting his own life". O'Mara also showed a chunk of concrete to the jury, telling them that Martin was not an unarmed teenager when he allegedly hit Zimmerman's head against the sidewalk. Mark O'Mara asked the jury how many "coulda beens" and "what ifs" have you heard from the state in this case. O'Mara also told the jury to not give anybody "the benefit of the doubt except for George Zimmerman".

=== Prosecution's rebuttal ===
Prosecutor John Guy delivered the state's rebuttal argument after the defense finished their closing argument. Guy told the jury that in order to know what happened that night, they should look "into the heart of the grown man and the heart of the child." Guy also argued to the jurors that if Zimmerman had done what he was supposed to do, none of us would be here. Guy also said that if Zimmerman had really wanted the police to get Martin, he would have stayed in his car and waited for the police.

== Jury instructions ==
Judge Nelson ruled that the lesser included offense of manslaughter could be considered by the jury and would be included in the jury instructions. The prosecution had requested that a lesser charge of third-degree felony murder, an offense that includes the commission of child abuse, be included in the jury instructions. Defense attorney Don West called the possible lesser charge "outrageous" and a "trick" by the state, because they had asked for it to be included at the last minute. Judge Nelson ruled that the jury would not be able to consider the offense of third-degree murder. (Note: Read the entire jury instructions given to the jury. George Zimmerman trial, jury instructions)

== Verdict ==
On Saturday, July 13, 2013, the day after deliberations began, the jury returned a verdict of not guilty for both second-degree murder and the lesser included charge of manslaughter. The jury deliberated for 16 hours before arriving at a verdict, which was read in court shortly after 10 pm EST. Following the announcement of the verdict, defense attorney Mark O'Mara told reporters at the courthouse that he was ecstatic with the decision by the jury. O'Mara thanked local law enforcement, the jury, and the time and effort they put into the process. Defense attorney Don West said he was still angry that Zimmerman was even brought to trial. West said that the prosecution of Zimmerman was "disgraceful" and that he was "thrilled the jury kept this tragedy from becoming a travesty". In response to a question from the media, O'Mara also claimed that if Zimmerman "had been black, he never would have been charged with a crime". When asked if Zimmerman had been overcharged in the case, State Attorney Angela Corey told reporters after the verdict that the allegations against Zimmerman "fit the bill" for a second-degree murder charge. Prosecutor de la Rionda said that he was disappointed with, but respected, the jury's verdict.

== Juror comments ==
=== B37 ===
Two days following the conclusion of the trial, one of the jurors (Juror B37) spoke with Anderson Cooper of CNN about her experience as a member of the jury. She said that in an initial vote, three of the jurors had voted to find Zimmerman not guilty, but two had voted to find him guilty of manslaughter and one had voted to find him guilty of second-degree murder: "there was a couple of them in there that wanted to find him guilty of something and after hours and hours and hours of deliberating over the law, and reading it over and over and over again, we decided there's just no way, other place to go." Jurors cried when they submitted their final vote to the court officer, she said.

Juror B37 told Cooper that she believed "It pretty much happened the way George said it happened." She believed the defense's argument that Martin had thrown the first punch in the confrontation and that it was Zimmerman's calls for help that were heard on the 911 call recordings, and she said that Zimmerman, fearing he was at risk of bodily harm or even loss of his life, had had a right to protect himself. In response to Cooper's questioning, she said that former lead police investigator Chris Serino's testimony that he had believed Zimmerman was telling the truth had made a strong impression on her (although Judge Nelson had instructed the jury that they should disregard Serino's comment and not consider it in rendering a verdict). Juror B37 also said that she did not believe Zimmerman had made any assumptions about Martin on the basis of Martin's skin color: "I think all of us thought race did not play a role.... We never had that discussion." The juror said she believed that ultimately both Martin and Zimmerman were partly to blame for the outcome. "It's a tragedy this happened. But it happened.... And I think both were responsible for the situation they had gotten themselves into. I think both of them could have walked away. It just didn't happen."

On the same day that Juror B37's interview with Anderson Cooper was broadcast, it was announced that Juror B37 and her attorney husband had contacted a literary agent on July 14, one day following the conclusion of the trial, and had signed to write a book about the case. The next day, the literary agent tweeted that she was rescinding her offer of representing her "after careful consideration." An online campaign, particularly on Black Twitter, to stop the publication had garnered over one thousand signatures at change.org. Neither the juror nor her agent said the campaign was the reason for cancelling the project. The literary agent released a statement from Juror B37 on Twitter which said the "isolation shielded me from the depth of pain that exists among the general public over every aspect of this case." Four of the other jurors released a statement saying that Juror B37's views should not be regarded as representative of their views on the trial. (Note: Statement released from the Eighteenth Judicial Circuit. State vs. Zimmerman jurors' request for privacy)

=== B29 ===
Juror B29, a 36-year-old Puerto Rican mother of eight children, who was living in Chicago at the time of the shooting, was interviewed about the trial on July 25. She said, "George Zimmerman got away with murder, but you can't get away from God. And at the end of the day, he's going to have a lot of questions and answers he has to deal with." She said that as the jury began deliberations, she wanted to convict Zimmerman of second-degree murder, and she held to her position that Zimmerman should be found guilty even after all the other jurors had decided to find him not guilty; however, she said that after nine hours of deliberations, she realized that there was not enough evidence to convict Zimmerman under Florida law: "As the law was read to me, if you have no proof that he killed him intentionally, you can't say he's guilty....you can't put the man in jail even though in our hearts we felt he was guilty." The juror said that she felt like she owed Martin's parents an apology because she felt she had let them down.

== Public response ==
The shooting and trial regarding Martin and Zimmerman became highly controversial and publicized, embarking national public discourse regarding racial profiling, gun control, and justice systems. The media pontificated upon certain aspects of the case and shooting, resulting in certain narratives; there were a plethora of opinions, protests, and propaganda which perpetuated national debate and outrage.

=== For the verdict ===
Some supporters of Zimmerman were pleased with the non-guilty verdict. Supporters were also outside the courthouse in Sanford, Florida, rejoicing the not guilty verdict. Some supporters at the courthouse said the jury made the right decision because they felt that Zimmerman shot and killed Martin in self-defense.

On the eve of the verdict, criminal law experts interviewed by CNN agreed that acquittal was likely. Christopher Darden, trial prosecutor in the O. J. Simpson murder case, said the prosecution's case lacked evidence: "[J]ust about everything the prosecution has asserted in this case has been addressed by the defense and refuted. ... [Y]ou have to wonder if you're a juror sitting on this case, why was this prosecution brought in the first place? ... I mean, there are just huge, huge holes in the prosecution's case." Criminal defense attorney Diana Tennis agreed, saying in part: "[W]e have a rule of law, we have a very high burden in criminal cases for a reason, no matter what the color of any party and in the USA you don't get convicted typically on evidence that is not better than this."

Comparisons were made between the Martin case and the O.J. Simpson murder case, and how race impacted both. During an interview with Piers Morgan, when asked if there was a similarity in the racial aspects of the cases, Ron Goldman's sister Kim said all of the evidence pointed towards guilt in Simpson's case, while she believed Zimmerman's not guilty verdict was correct because it was a self defense case and that the killing of Martin was not racially charged. Fred Goldman also denied racism played a factor in the killing of Trayvon or the outcome of the Simpson trial in an interview. Attorney and former Court TV anchor Jami Floyd told BET, "It is clear that George Zimmerman pursued Trayvon Martin and that he shot him. But it boils down to the question of who threw the first punch. There are only two people who could answer that question, and one of them is dead."

Alan Dershowitz told the BBC that the verdict was "right" since there was "reasonable doubt" as to Zimmerman's guilt. In regards to the prosecution, he said to Mike Huckabee: "She (State Attorney Angela Corey) submitted an affidavit that was, if not perjurious, completely misleading. She violated all kinds of rules of the profession, and her conduct bordered on criminal conduct. ... Halfway through the trial she realized she wasn't going to get a second degree murder verdict, so she asked for a compromised verdict, for manslaughter. And then, she went even further and said that she was going to charge him with child abuse and felony murder. That was such a stretch that it goes beyond anything professionally responsible. She was among the most irresponsible prosecutors I've seen in 50 years of litigating cases, and believe me, I've seen good prosecutors, bad prosecutors, but rarely have I seen one as bad as this prosecutor."

ABC chief legal affairs anchor Dan Abrams called it "the right legal verdict". He said the prosecution had a tough case from the start, and, "as a legal matter, I don't see how they [the jury] could have reached another verdict, considering how the law works with regard to self-defense". Former President Jimmy Carter said the jury made the "right decision" based on the evidence presented by the prosecution. Carter said, "It's not a moral question, it's a legal question and the American law requires that the jury listens to the evidence presented." President Obama said after the verdict that "we are a nation of laws, and a jury has spoken. I now ask every American to respect the call for calm reflection from two parents who lost their young son."

After the trial, as calls to prosecute Zimmerman for an alleged federal civil rights violation were heard, the Los Angeles Times editorial board wrote that such a move was unwarranted by the evidence and could amount to double jeopardy: "[Zimmerman] shouldn't have assumed that Martin was up to no good, and he shouldn't have pursued him after a police dispatcher warned him not to. And yet not every tragedy or bad judgment is proof of a crime, much less a federal civil rights violation."

=== Against the verdict ===
Supporters of Trayvon Martin protested outside the courthouse, accompanied with chants and cries for justice. Some supporters of Zimmerman were not pleased with the verdict, considering they had felt that the prosecution had failed to prove their case beyond a reasonable doubt. The trial has been referred to by some as a "failed prosecution", in the sense that the prosecution should have approached their case differently in order to constitute justice. Critics speculated that the prosecution had overcharged Zimmerman, and had Zimmerman's prosecution presented a lesser charge such as felony stalking second to the second degree murder, Zimmerman's verdict may have differed, appeasing and satisfying those who had felt Zimmerman had got off easy while justice is served.

Martin's father, Tracy Martin tweeted after the verdict was announced: "Even though I am broken hearted my faith is unshattered I will always love my baby Tray." Civil rights leader Jesse Jackson said that he was stunned by the decision and that the Department of Justice must intervene to take it to another level. Benjamin Jealous, president of the NAACP, said that he had spoken to senior justice officials about pursuing federal civil rights charges against Zimmerman. Al Sharpton said the verdict was a "slap in the face to the American people" and urged action by federal officials.

Musician Stevie Wonder told a concert audience in Canada after the verdict, that he had decided, until the stand your ground law is abolished in Florida, he would never perform there again. Wonder also told the audience that he would not perform in any state or part of the world where that law exists. According to CNN, there are currently 22 states that have a version of the stand your ground law, including his home state of Michigan, and current state of California. Despite the boycott, Wonder would take his Songs in the Key of Life Tour to venues in Michigan and California in 2014.

=== Media criticism ===
While some were dissatisfied with the verdict, others displaced their dissatisfaction towards the manner in which public sources pontificated upon aspects of the shooting and case. As the case swept the nation an approximate 3 weeks after the Sanford Herald documented the story, publications and news sources pontificated upon certain aspects of the situation immediately; for example, some news sources determined Zimmerman had "claim[ed] self-defense" whereas others accepted self-defense as a fact regarding his actions. Additionally, Zimmerman was described as "white" despite his identification as Hispanic in certain articles without correction and Martin "was described as a black teenager in a hoodie, which new audiences have been primed to regard as dangerous"; these details impacted depictions of the incident with no empirical evidence to support its derivative. The discrepancy involved in the incident enabled authors to fill in the blanks. For example, authors elaborated on the notion of the framing of race, in which black Americans faced unfair depictions as opposed to white Americans depicted as saviors, and so encouraging the subconscious indulgence of stereotypes unrelated to the case itself and its attributes. Additionally, others developed the idea that Martin was exploited in order for others to gain power off of his suffering, furthering race as an artificial and divisive tool. The incident and case proves to emphasize the role in which audiences can derive biased narratives based on connotations of race, tainting evidence utilized in cases and legal matters.

=== Protests ===
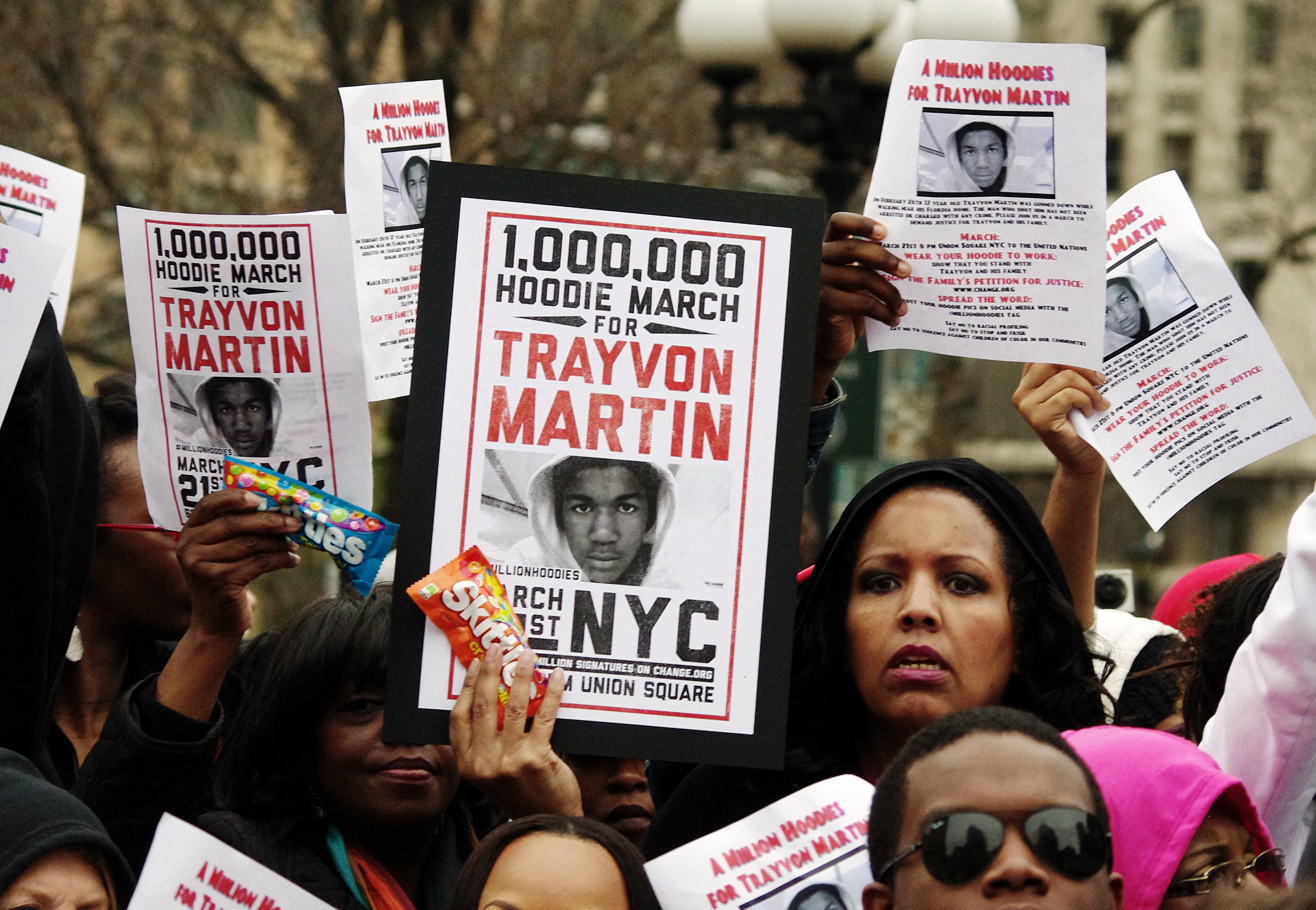
Picture of Trayvon Martin shooting protest in 2012

Police in Oakland, California, said about one hundred people protested, with some protesters breaking windows and starting fires in the streets. Protesters there also reportedly vandalized a police car, burned an American flag and a California state flag, and spray-painted a county courthouse. Other protests in support of the Martin family occurred in Washington, D.C., Los Angeles, San Francisco, Chicago, Denver, Baltimore, Detroit and New York City, among others. In response to the acquittal of Zimmerman, protests through a multitude of forms emerged, including films and documentaries, social media posts, and non-violent and violent rallies.

=== Black Lives Matter ===
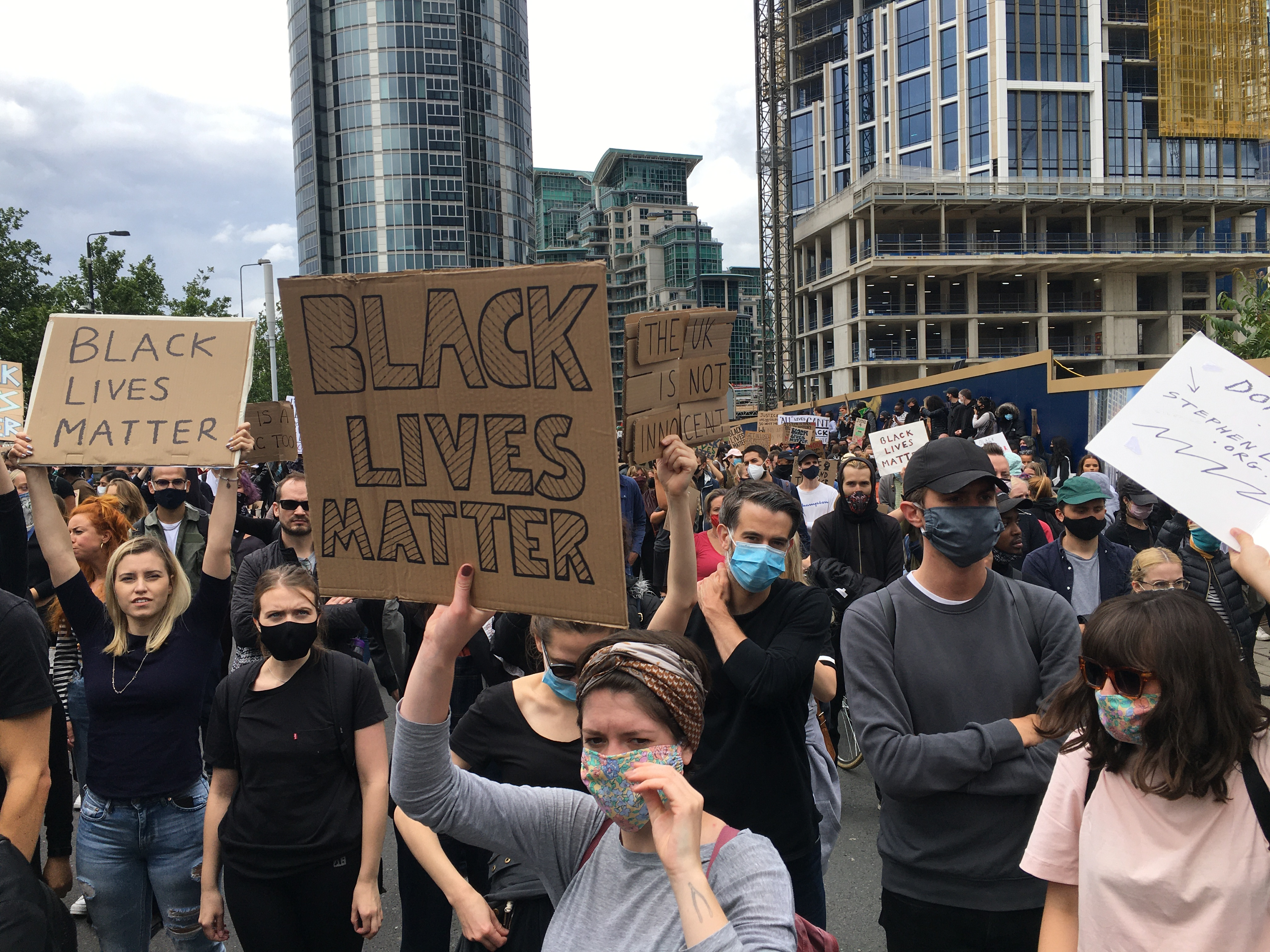
Protesters for Black Lives Matter at the U.S. Embassy in London in June 2020

Martin's death can be analyzed as a catalyst incident for the Black Lives Matter movement. The term "Black Lives Matter" was mainly integrated into social literature through hashtags on Twitter in response to the acquittal of Zimmerman, and has now grown in its prevalence and significance politically. In simple terms, Black Lives Matter can be described as an activist movement in which supporters strive for equality, liberation, and justice of black people. The organization has continued to acknowledge issues of racial inequality and acknowledge widespread police and race-related killings including Breonna Taylor, George Floyd, Ahmaud Arbery and numerous others.

The effects of Black Lives Matter has been paralleled by countries around the world, shifting police brutality into the public eye and requiring reflection regarding the multitude of fields it impacts including economics, morality, and equality. In terms of Martin and Zimmerman, it enabled an outlet in which protestors could demand justice and disseminate a social power and strength within communities, with its participants perpetrating a widespread call-to-action through these protests and conventions. The Black Lives Matter movement has been referred to by several writers in the New York Times as the largest social movement in U.S. history.

== Analysis and reflection ==
In order to utilize the shooting and case as education, officers and leaders engage in interconnected strategies which incorporate psychological and political concepts to better their systems. The death of Martin and trial of Zimmerman has encouraged reconsideration of certain policing implications and enforced structures in order to prevent a similar incident and thus political outcry. For example, Chief Joseph H. Lumpkin develops enforcements which encourages meaningful reflection of the case, including representative bureaucracy, community-oriented policing (COP), and means for successful recruitment, motivations and training of police officers. Representative bureaucracy emphasizes the representation of various groups actively regardless of demographic characteristics, COP focuses on remaining engaged in a community's needs and collaboration between police and citizens, and training of police officers entails the ongoing attention and educational support for continuous learning of police officer's and their duties.
