= Raiford =

Raiford is a surname. Notable people with the surname include:

- Conrad L. Raiford (1907–2002), American athlete and police officer
- Robert D. Raiford (1927–2017), American radio broadcaster and actor
- Rudolph Douglas Raiford (1922–2002), American WWII veteran and lawyer

== See also ==
- Raiford, Florida, a town
