= Rudolph Douglas Raiford =

American lawyer

- Born: January 14, 1922; Greensboro, North Carolina, U.S.
- Died: January 28, 2002 (aged 80); Greensboro, North Carolina, U.S.
- Occupations: Buffalo Soldier, World War II Hero, Attorney

Rudolph Douglas Raiford was a decorated World War II combat officer who trained and commanded the United States Infantry Buffalo Division in Italy. Raiford served for five years in the European Theatre, leading forces as large as 300 strong.

== Infantry Buffalo Division ==
The 92nd Infantry was the only so-called black division to see combat in Europe. Created during an era when segregation was prevalent in America, the 92nd Division was beset continuously by controversy because of the same rigid policy of segregation in the U.S. Army.

Except for a few chaplains and medical officers, all commanders and staff officers were supposed to be white because no black officer in the 92nd Division was considered capable of commanding an infantry battalion.

With piercing blue eyes and a Caucasian phenotype, First Lieutenant Raiford was mistakenly considered a white man and was, subsequently, appointed to the position of a company commander. In actuality, Raiford was of European/African-American/Native American lineage. He was a four-year college graduate and spoke conversational French, Italian and German; he could also read Latin.

== Leadership ==
On February 4, 1945, plans for an attack on an enemy-fortified position necessitated safe routes of advance through the mine-and-sniper-studded terrain of Strettoia Hills.

As a commander, Raiford volunteered to lead a daylight patrol to secure vital information. Disregarding his own safety, Raiford led his troops under intense small arms and mortar fire. Without communication, Raiford accomplished his mission and exposed himself to intense enemy fire. Although severely wounded, Raiford refused to retreat or surrender until he had secured all information needed to protect advancing troops.

Determined to lead every member of his patrol to safety without casualty, Raiford returned to open ground to successfully recover a wounded soldier pinned down by sniper fire.

Raiford was hospitalized for more than two years for massive internal injuries sustained during the dangerous intelligence and rescue mission.

== World War II hero ==
Raiford became the recipient of a Purple Heart and a Silver Star for gallantry. Raiford also earned an Army of Occupation Medal, an American Campaign Medal, a European-African-Middle Eastern Campaign Medal and a World War II Victory Medal.

== Legal precedents ==
It was the GI Bill that enabled Raiford to study international law at Columbia Law School in New York City. Raiford started his law practice in New Rochelle, New York, immediately following graduation.

In Vinson vs Greenburgh Housing Authority, Raiford established a precedent that remains a fair housing law of the State of New York; numerous states have since followed the ruling.

=== Vinson vs Greenburgh Housing Authority ===
The Vinson vs Greenburgh Housing Authority case concerned the right of a housing authority to terminate the lease of a tenant living in a low rent housing project without stating a reason for the determination. Raiford's contention was that a public housing authority did not have untrammeled discretion to evict its tenants by invoking the notice provisions in the lease, but was required to afford tenants the right to due process in the form of stated reasons for the termination.

== Fair housing ==
In 1988, Raiford accepted the top position of Chief of Labor Relations for the Southeast/Caribbean and the United States Department of Housing and Urban Development (HUD). Based in Atlanta, Georgia, Raiford administered and enforced federal labor standards for HUD-financed construction throughout North Carolina, South Carolina, Tennessee, Kentucky, Georgia, Alabama, Mississippi and Florida. Raiford also oversaw labor standards in the U.S. territories of Puerto Rico and the United States Virgin Islands. Raiford was the Chairman of former United States attorney general John Ashcroft's National Labor Relations Advisory Committee. Raiford also advised President George H. W. Bush.

By the end of Raiford's tenure, he had established new and improved labor relations policies throughout more than eight hundred public housing authorities.

== Education ==
Raiford graduated from Greensboro, North Carolina's James B. Dudley High School at age 16 and was admitted to Washington, D.C.'s Howard University. Raiford later attended Columbia University in New York, New York, from where he received a Doctor of Laws degree.

Raiford was a member of the New York State Bar, the Federal Courts Bar and the United States Supreme Court Bar.

== Family ==
Raiford was the youngest of eight siblings born to Ernest E. and Nannie Tillery Raiford of Greensboro, North Carolina, and the brother of lawman and humanitarian Conrad L. Raiford.

Raiford was married to Edith Leone of Italy, with whom he bore a son, Kim Leone Raiford. After Raiford and Leone divorced, he married Shirley Arleen Clarke of New York; his blended family now included Robert, Susan and Timothy James, all of whom Raiford helped rear from youth. Following his and Clarke's divorce, Raiford married Rosemary Paul of New York.

== Facts of life ==
- Raiford's professor and mentor, Dr. Ralph Bunche, encouraged him to study international law.
- All the males in Raiford's family were members of the United Methodist Men, a servitude and philanthropic organization established in 1912 by St. Matthew's United Methodist Church in Greensboro, North Carolina.
- Raiford was a professional chess player.
- Considered a prodigy, Raiford took a liking to political science at age seven.
- Raiford's biological son, Kim, is the step-nephew of Suzanne de Passe.
- Raiford's stepson, Robert James, is an associate provost at State University of New York and CEO of a network that provides funding for nearly 50 educational programs throughout New York State.
- Raiford was the uncle of former television personality Sharon Dahlonega Raiford Bush (née Sharon Crews).
- Raiford served as Infantry Unit Commander 1542 in the Company B 372nd organization of World War II; he was a proficient rifleman and heavy weapons expert.
- Raiford entered active duty on February 4, 1942, and was relieved from active duty on April 19, 1947.
