= Mark Asay =

Executed American spree killer (1964–2017)

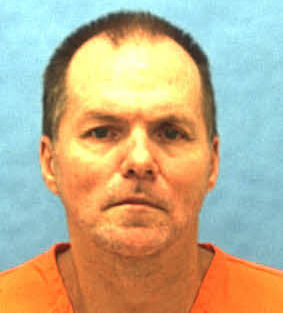
- Born: March 12, 1964; Jacksonville, Florida, U.S.
- Died: August 24, 2017 (aged 53); Florida State Prison, Florida, U.S.
- Status: Executed by lethal injection
- Motive: White supremacy
- Conviction: First degree murder (2 counts)
- Penalty: Death (November 18, 1988)

Details
- Victims: Robert Lee Booker, 34; Robert McDowell, 26
- Date: July 18, 1987
- Country: United States
- State: Florida

Mark James Asay (March 12, 1964 – August 24, 2017) was an American spree killer who was executed by the state of Florida for the 1987 racially motivated murders of two men in Jacksonville, Florida. He was convicted, sentenced to death, and subsequently executed in 2017 at Florida State Prison by lethal injection. Asay's execution generated attention as it was noted by multiple news agencies that he was the first white person to be executed in Florida for killing a black person. He was also the first person to be executed in the United States using the drug etomidate.

== Murders ==
On July 17, 1987, Asay, his brother Robbie, and friend Bubba, visited multiple bars in Jacksonville, Florida, where they drank beer and played pool. After leaving a bar in the early hours of July 18, the three men decided to head downtown to find some prostitutes. Once there, Robbie began speaking with another man, 34-year-old Robert Lee Booker, who was black. Asay grew angry and started shouting racial slurs at Booker. After the two got into a confrontation, Asay took out a gun from his back pocket and shot Booker once in the abdomen, the bullet penetrating Booker's intestines as well as perforating an artery, causing fatal internal hemorrhaging. Although Booker initially managed to flee from his assailant, his body was found later that day under the edge of a house.

Robbie fled the area after the shooting while Asay and Bubba left in a truck. When Bubba asked him why he had shot Booker, Asay responded, "Because you got to show a nigger who is boss". Asay did not believe he had killed Booker after shooting him.

Afterward, Asay and Bubba continued to look for prostitutes. Bubba then spotted a prostitute whom he only knew as "Renee" who he believed would give them oral sex. Both men were unaware that Renee was actually a 26-year-old mixed-race white and Hispanic man named Robert McDowell, who dressed as a woman. After speaking with McDowell, the two negotiated a deal for oral sex. Bubba drove himself and Asay to a nearby alley and McDowell followed them. Once there, Asay left the truck so Bubba and McDowell could have sex. As McDowell got into the truck, Asay suddenly returned, grabbed McDowell's arm, pulled him from the truck, and shot at him. Asay shot McDowell six times as he attempted to escape. Asay and Bubba then drove away, with Asay claiming he shot McDowell because "the bitch had beat me out of ten dollars on a blow job." McDowell's body was found on the ground in the alley not long after the shooting. According to a medical examiner, McDowell had been shot three times in the chest cavity, any of which would have been fatal.

== Capture and trial ==
Asay later told two acquaintances that he shot McDowell because he had allegedly cheated him out of ten dollars in a drug deal. The acquaintances also testified that Asay had claimed to shoot McDowell four times in the chest and that he shot him again once he had fallen to the ground.

As a result of tips from the two acquaintances and McDowell's murder being featured on a television crime watch segment, Asay was arrested and charged with two counts of first-degree murder. He was ultimately found guilty of both murders and the jury recommended he receive the death penalty. As such, the trial court imposed a sentence of death for each conviction. On November 18, 1988, Asay was sentenced to death for the murders of Booker and McDowell, receiving a separate death sentence for each murder. Asay was prosecuted by Bernie de la Rionda, which at the time, was his first death penalty-eligible case. Asay's death sentences were upheld in 1991 and 2000.

Asay later admitted to a Jacksonville television station that he killed McDowell but maintained his innocence in the murder of Booker.

== Execution ==
Asay was first scheduled to be executed on March 17, 2016. However, on March 2, the Supreme Court of Florida halted the execution after the Supreme Court of the United States ruled that Florida's death penalty laws were unconstitutional, a ruling that was made in January 2016 following Hurst v. Florida. Asay's execution warrant had been signed by Governor Rick Scott prior to the ruling in early January. On July 3, 2017, following months of Florida's death penalty laws being left in legal limbo, Scott signed Asay's execution warrant, scheduling him for execution on August 24, 2017.

Asay was to be executed via lethal injection. The execution method that was to be used included two drugs that had never been used before in a Florida execution: etomidate, an anaesthetic agent used for the induction of general anaesthesia and sedation and which had never been used anywhere for an execution, and — in lieu of potassium chloride — potassium acetate, which had been used only once before in the United States, by accident, in an Oklahoma execution. The lethal injection combination was new, due to states struggling to acquire the drugs needed for lethal injection. Asay's lawyers tried arguing that the new combination of drugs violated his constitutional right to an execution free from cruel and unusual punishment. Ultimately, the Supreme Court of Florida rejected the appeal and said he had failed to show that was likely.

On August 24, 2017, Asay was executed at Florida State Prison via lethal injection, in which the new drug combination was used. He was pronounced dead at 6:22 p.m. and made no final statement. His last meal consisted of fried pork chops, fried ham, French fries, vanilla swirl ice cream, and a can of Coke. No one from his family witnessed the execution. It was the first execution in Florida in over nineteen months, since Oscar Ray Bolin was executed in January 2016. A Florida Department of Corrections official later stated that the execution had occurred without any incident and that Asay did not speak or show any indication of pain during the execution procedure.

Asay's execution marked the first time in Florida state history that a white person was executed for killing a black person, something that had never happened before in Florida since capital punishment first began in the state in 1769. However, only one of Asay's victims (Booker) was black. The other victim (McDowell) was a mixed-race man of white and Hispanic descent, but during Asay's trial, the court mistakenly believed that McDowell was also black. This caused the Supreme Court of Florida to issue a rare mea culpa not long before Asay's execution, in which they acknowledged that for more than twenty years they had mistakenly believed that McDowell was black. The court apologized for the error but ruled that their mistake had no bearing on the overall outcome of Asay's death sentence. Asay remained the only white person to be executed in Florida for killing a black person until the 2025 execution of Samuel Lee Smithers.

In 1926, a white man Britt Pringle was sentenced to death for the axe murder of a black man. He was nearly executed several times. In one instance, he came within an hour of execution, at which point his head had already been shaven in preparation for his death in the state's electric chair. However, in 1933, Pringle was declared insane and thus unfit for execution.

== See also ==
- Capital punishment in Florida
- Capital punishment in the United States
- List of people executed by lethal injection
- List of people executed in Florida
- List of people executed in the United States in 2017
- List of white defendants executed for killing a black victim
- Race and capital punishment in the United States

== Notes ==
Executions carried out in Florida
Preceded by Oscar Ray Bolin Jr. January 7, 2016	Mark James Asay; August 24, 2017	Succeeded by Michael Ray Lambrix October 5, 2017
Executions carried out in the United States
Preceded by Taichin Preyor – Texas July 27, 2017	Mark James Asay – Florida; August 24, 2017	Succeeded by Gary Wayne Otte – Ohio September 13, 2017
White defendants executed for killing a black victim in the United States
Preceded by William Charles Morva – Virginia July 6, 2017	Mark James Asay – Florida; August 24, 2017	Succeeded by John William King – Texas April 24, 2019
