= Bernie de la Rionda =

American lawyer

- Born: Bernardo Enrique de la Rionda; February 9, 1957 (age 68); Cuba
- Education: Miami-Dade Community College (AA); University of Miami (BA); Florida State University (JD)
- Occupation: lawyer

Bernardo Enrique "Bernie" de la Rionda (born February 9, 1957) is an American lawyer.

== Biography ==
Born in Cuba, de la Rionda moved to Miami, Florida in the U.S. to live with relatives at age four and never saw his parents again.

He graduated from the Miami-Dade Community College with an Associate of Arts in 1978, University of Miami with a Bachelor of Arts in politics, public affairs and history in 1980, and Florida State University College of Law with a Juris Doctor in 1982.

In 1988, he prosecuted spree killer Mark Asay, in his first death penalty-eligible case. Ultimately, Asay was executed in 2017, marking de la Rionda's first successful death sentence carried out by the state.

In 1996 he prosecuted serial killer Gary Ray Bowles in Jacksonville, Florida. In 2019 he attended Bowles' execution.

In 2010, he was honored with the FBI Director's Community Leadership Award for being an "exceptional prosecutor".

He served as an assistant state attorney in the fourth judicial circuit in the State of Florida from 1983 until his retirement in 2018. and was the lead prosecutor in State of Florida vs. George Zimmerman.

Since 2018 he has served as an Attorney in private practice and is writing two books based on his experience coming to the United States and the death penalty.

=== George Zimmerman trial ===
De la Rionda was selected by state attorney Angela Corey to serve as the lead prosecutor for the case. Zimmerman was found not guilty after two days of jury deliberations.
