= Forestville, Ohio =

- Census-designated place
- Location in Hamilton County and the state of Ohio.
- Coordinates: 39°04′16″N 84°20′20″W
- Country: United States
- State: Ohio
- County: Hamilton

Area
  - Total: 3.70 sq mi (9.58 km^{2})
  - Land: 3.70 sq mi (9.58 km^{2})
  - Water: 0 sq mi (0.00 km^{2})
- Elevation: 837 ft (255 m)

Population (2020)
  - Total: 10,615
  - Density: 2,870.1/sq mi (1,108.17/km^{2})
- Time zone: UTC-5 (Eastern (EST))
  - Summer (DST): UTC-4 (EDT)
- FIPS code: 39-27776
- GNIS feature ID: 2393001

Forestville is a census-designated place (CDP) in Anderson Township, Hamilton County, Ohio, United States. The population was 10,615 at the 2020 census.

== Geography ==
According to the United States Census Bureau, the CDP has a total area of 3.7 square miles (9.6 km^{2}), all land.

== Demographics ==
Historical population
Census	Pop.	Note	%±
2020	10,615		—
U.S. Decennial Census

=== 2020 census ===
As of the 2020 census, Forestville had a population of 10,615. The population density was 2,870.47 inhabitants per square mile (1,108.17/km^{2}). The median age was 42.6 years. 23.3% of residents were under the age of 18 and 21.7% of residents were 65 years of age or older. For every 100 females there were 88.7 males, and for every 100 females age 18 and over there were 83.6 males age 18 and over.

100.0% of residents lived in urban areas, while 0.0% lived in rural areas.

There were 4,360 households in Forestville, of which 31.1% had children under the age of 18 living in them. Of all households, 53.1% were married-couple households, 12.6% were households with a male householder and no spouse or partner present, and 30.0% were households with a female householder and no spouse or partner present. About 29.5% of all households were made up of individuals and 17.7% had someone living alone who was 65 years of age or older. The average household size was 2.31, and the average family size was 3.04.

There were 4,657 housing units, of which 6.4% were vacant. The homeowner vacancy rate was 1.4% and the rental vacancy rate was 4.1%.

Racial composition as of the 2020 census
Race	Number	Percent
White	9,416	88.7%
Black or African American	178	1.7%
American Indian and Alaska Native	17	0.2%
Asian	347	3.3%
Native Hawaiian and Other Pacific Islander	9	0.1%
Some other race	114	1.1%
Two or more races	534	5.0%
Hispanic or Latino (of any race)	307	2.9%

=== Income and poverty ===
According to the U.S. Census American Community Survey, for the period 2016-2020 the estimated median annual income for a household in the CDP was $79,731, and the median income for a family was $107,650. About 4.5% of the population were living below the poverty line, including 4.4% of those under age 18 and 5.1% of those age 65 or over. About 58.5% of the population were employed, and 52.9% had a bachelor's degree or higher.

=== 2000 census ===
At the 2000 census there were 10,978 people, 4,368 households, and 2,948 families living in the CDP. The population density was 2,981.7 inhabitants per square mile (1,151.2/km^{2}). There were 4,503 housing units at an average density of 1,223.0 per square mile (472.2/km^{2}). The racial makeup of the CDP was 95.72% White, 0.87% African American, 0.05% Native American, 2.22% Asian, 0.01% Pacific Islander, 0.31% from other races, and 0.82% from two or more races. Hispanic or Latino of any race were 1.06%.

Of the 4,368 households 34.2% had children under the age of 18 living with them, 57.3% were married couples living together, 8.0% had a female householder with no husband present, and 32.5% were non-families. 29.4% of households were one person and 16.3% were one person aged 65 or older. The average household size was 2.49 and the average family size was 3.12.

The age distribution was 27.1% under the age of 18, 5.8% from 18 to 24, 26.9% from 25 to 44, 24.2% from 45 to 64, and 16.0% 65 or older. The median age was 39 years. For every 100 females, there were 86.6 males. For every 100 females age 18 and over, there were 82.7 males.

The median household income was $57,850 and the median family income was $76,020. Males had a median income of $56,488 versus $36,493 for females. The per capita income for the CDP was $30,493. About 2.5% of families and 3.6% of the population were below the poverty line, including 3.9% of those under age 18 and 6.5% of those age 65 or over.
