= Killing of Clarence Horatious Pickett =

1957 killing

Clarence Horatious Pickett (died December 23, 1957) was an African American preacher who died after injuries sustained in a jailhouse beating. The police officer charged in his death was found not-guilty by an all-white jury despite multiple experts testifying that Pickett had died as a result of being beaten. Other factors in Pickett's death included medical racism from a doctor who dismissed his concerns the day before his death.

== Pickett's life and death ==
Clarence Pickett was an African American preacher who worked part-time as an advertising salesman at The Columbus World. Pickett was known to have struggled with alcoholism and had previously been incarcerated in the Milledgeville Asylum. One of his release conditions was to abstain from alcohol, however, on the morning of December 21, 1957, he had been drinking in Columbus, Georgia. Later in the afternoon, Pickett visited The Columbus World's offices to pick up his paycheck, where he became belligerent and raised his voice at his supervisor.

Two passing police officers saw the scene and stopped, however they did not arrest Pickett, instead telling him to go home. Several hours later, after Pickett had caused a disturbance at a grocery store, he was arrested by two officers for being "plain drunk." After being taken to the city jail, he swore at the officer on duty, Joseph Cameron, calling him a "big son of a bitch" and offering to bribe him in exchange for early release. As Pickett's outburst continued, Cameron entered the cell and began beating Pickett with a baton. Even after Pickett had stopped resisting, Cameron continued to beat him until he lost consciousness. Pickett's cellmates would later testify that he had not fought back and that Pickett had not appeared drunk when he had arrived at the jail.

Before being released the following day, Pickett mentioned to his cellmates that he had severe pain in his abdomen. He was released midday on December 22. Upon arriving home, his family called an ambulance to examine his wounds, but the doctor determined Pickett was not suffering severely enough to be treated. During the doctor's analysis, he commented that he thought Pickett was faking his illness and ignored Pickett's attempted explanation of his injuries. He died at home on December 23.

== Trial of Joseph Cameron ==
Cameron had been a police officer for three years but was new to working in the jail, having been appointed to the position in June 1957. An autopsy determined that Pickett had died from blood poisoning and injuries to his intestines and a later coroner's jury found that those injuries were sustained by a "blow or blows struck by Cameron." Cameron was charged in Pickett's death in 1958, plead not guilty, and was released on a $5,000 bond. The trial, initially scheduled for February, was eventually held on April 23, 1958.

During the trial, Pickett's cellmates testified that they had witnessed Cameron severely beat Pickett, however, Cameron claimed that Pickett had assaulted him and that he had merely defended himself. One prisoner testified that after word of Pickett's death had reached the prison, Cameron had claimed he was not worried because "the Negro waited too long to say anything about it." Cameron's defense also alleged that Pickett had been beaten by a different officer. When those charges were refuted by witnesses, they further alleged that Pickett's supervisor at The Columbus World had beaten him, which was again refuted by eyewitnesses. At the conclusion of the trial, after just an hour and a half of deliberation, Cameron was found not guilty.

Despite initially expressing doubts about returning to the force, Cameron was reinstated with back pay on May 12, 1958. He continued to work as a police officer until his death from an illness on September 29, 1968.

== Legacy ==
In 2008, the Federal Bureau of Investigation reopened the investigation into Pickett's death. On April 7, 2010, the case was closed, with the FBI concluding that, because Cameron had died and the statute of limitations had expired, the government did not have the authority to prosecute anybody for Pickett's death.
