= Conrad L. Raiford =

American athlete, goodwill ambassador and police officer

- Conrad L Raiford (1947)

Personal details
- Born: Conrad Laurel Raiford; December 27, 1907; Greensboro, North Carolina U.S.
- Died: May 20, 2002 (aged 94); Greensboro, North Carolina

Conrad Laurel Raiford (December 27, 1907 – May 20, 2002) was an American athlete, goodwill ambassador and one of the first African-American police officers in Greensboro, North Carolina.

== Career ==
In 1946, Raiford was one of only six black men recruited by the then all white Greensboro Police Department. Although Raiford was proud to be a pioneering member of law enforcement, Raiford resented the way he and his fellow black officers were treated in a city that was then one of the more populated incorporated areas in the Tarheel state. At the time, these police officers were not allowed to arrest anyone outside their ethnicity.

"I had to wear rejects," Raiford told his daughter, Sharon Crews during an interview for ABC News. "I had to wear pants another officer had been wearing for two years. They were shiny. They didn't fit." Things were not any better in the North and Midwest.

"They even built a second bathroom down in the cold and rat-infested basement of city hall because we were considered less than human," said Raiford. "It took a special man to take that."

Life for America's first black police officers was not easy. For Raiford, the tension and humiliation became too much to bear. After a five-year tour of duty, Raiford traded his badge for a rundown schoolhouse for black children located in a remote area of Guilford County called Goodwill. A defunct book titled "Hiawatha, the Warrior," was compulsory reading for all of the first through twelfth graders he taught.

Although Raiford's days of patrolling the streets of Greensboro had come to an end in 1951, his commitment to improving the lives of those disenfranchised by Jim Crow was just beginning.

=== Other activities ===
Raiford went on to become a human rights activist, a Greensboro City Council member, Commissioner of the Greensboro Parks and Recreation Department and the North Carolina Goodwill Ambassador for the 1972 Summer Olympics in Munich, West Germany.

In 1977, Greensboro city officials honored Raiford by naming the Warnersville Recreation Center swimming pool after him.

=== Lifeguard ===
In 1937, Raiford became one of Greensboro's first African-American certified lifeguards. A champion swimmer, Raiford was a swim instructor at the Hayes Taylor YMCA.

When the United States entered World War II in 1941, Raiford was authorized to aid military personnel and engage in voluntary rescue missions for the American Red Cross.

== Activist ==
Raiford was a key player during the turbulent civil rights movement of the 1960s by becoming one of Greensboro's two African-American bail bondsmen. Raiford freed then A&T student body president Jesse Jackson after Jackson's first arrest following a protest march in 1963. Jackson and other activists, like Ezelle Blair and Joseph McNeil, committed to memory Raiford's home phone number.

When a targeted Jackson began facing a higher bail and stiffer sentence, Raiford often got the peaceful protester out of jail on credit to continue the South's expanding Freedom Movement.

=== Curfew arrest ===
In the wake of riots in American cities following the April 4, 1968 assassination of Martin Luther King Jr. in Memphis, the State of North Carolina enforced a strict curfew that made it illegal for all civilians to leave their homes after 8:00 p.m.

Raiford's 1968 arrest warrant for violating curfew

On the evening of April 9, 1968, Raiford dropped off a couple of just-freed A&T students and was returning home when he violated the curfew. Raiford, now age 61, said he glanced at his watch, quietly exited his car, sensing something was not right. Raiford said he attempted to continue stealthily on foot, hoping the darkness of a neighborhood park would protect him.

Once he cleared the brush, Raiford said he was ambushed by four angry police officers who did not care that Raiford was a recognized lawman. Raiford was arrested; he spent the night behind bars.

== Education ==
Raiford attended North Carolina Agricultural and Technical State University (A&T), where he lettered in football, track, baseball and swimming. Raiford graduated in 1936 with a Bachelor of Science degree in biology and was inducted into A&T's Sports Hall of Fame in 1971.

== Family ==
Raiford and elementary school teacher Myrtle Mary Frances Wright were married for 54 years. They had four children: Conrad Eugene, Janice Artelia, Sharon Daisy and Lisa Rozenia.
