= List of Columbia College people =

The following list contains only notable graduates and former students of Columbia College, the undergraduate liberal arts division of Columbia University, and its predecessor, from 1754 to 1776, King's College. For a full list of individuals associated with the university as a whole, see the List of Columbia University people. An asterisk (*) indicates a former student who did not graduate.

== Founding fathers of the United States ==
- John Jay (King's 1764), president of the Continental Congress; first chief justice of the United States; author of five of The Federalist papers; first secretary of foreign affairs under the Articles of Confederation; architect of Jay Treaty with Great Britain
- Robert Livingston (King's 1764), a writer of the Declaration of Independence as part of the Committee of Five; first U.S. secretary of foreign affairs; negotiator of the Louisiana Purchase
- Egbert Benson (King's 1765), delegate to the Continental Congress, U.S. representative, first New York State attorney general, chief justice of the New York Supreme Court
- Gouverneur Morris (King's 1768), represented Pennsylvania in the Continental Congress; authored much of the United States Constitution; U.S. ambassador to France; United States senator from New York
- Alexander Hamilton* (King's 1776), American Revolutionary War officer, aide-de-camp to George Washington; most prolific writer of The Federalist Papers; first United States secretary of the treasury, portrayed on the ten-dollar bill; founder of the Bank of New York

== Scholars ==
- Clement Clarke Moore (1798), son of bishop Benjamin Moore; professor of Oriental and Greek literature; attributed author of The Night Before Christmas
- John Anthon (1801), jurist
- John Church Hamilton (1809), son of Alexander Hamilton, American historian
- Charles Anthon (1815), classical scholar and translator known for the Anthon Transcript
- Henry Drisler (1839), classical scholar and acting president of Columbia College
- Julius Sachs (1867), founder of Dwight School, professor at Teachers College, Columbia University and scion of the Goldman–Sachs family
- William Milligan Sloane (1868), historian, president of the American Academy of Arts and Letters and founder of the United States Olympic Committee
- Felix Adler (1870), professor of political and social ethics, founder of the Ethical Culture movement and the Ethical Culture Fieldston School
- Brander Matthews (1871), first professor of dramatic literature in the U.S.
- Charles Waldstein (A.M. 1873), Anglo-American archeologist, director of the Fitzwilliam Museum and American School of Classical Studies at Athens; first Jewish American athlete in the Olympic Games
- John Aaron Browning (1875), educator, founder of the Browning School
- Richard T. Ely (1876), economist, founder and president of the American Economic Association
- Edward Washburn Hopkins (1878), professor of Sanskrit at Yale University
- Edwin Robert Anderson Seligman (1879), economist
- William Archibald Dunning (1881), founder of the Dunning School of Reconstruction
- James Chidester Egbert Jr. (1881), classical scholar and educator
- Richard James Horatio Gottheil (1881), Zionist scholar, founder of the first Jewish fraternity Zeta Beta Tau
- Harry Thurston Peck (1881), literary critic and editor of The Bookman
- A. V. Williams Jackson (1883), specialist on Indo-European languages
- Charles Knapp (1887), classical scholar
- Frank Moore Colby (1888), historian and editor of The New International Encyclopedia
- Charles Sears Baldwin (1888), scholar and professor of rhetoric at Yale University
- John Dyneley Prince (1888), linguist; U.S. ambassador to Yugoslavia
- George Louis Beer (1892), renowned historian of the "Imperial school"
- Benjamin Lord Buckley (1892), educator, founder and headmaster of Buckley School
- Judah A. Joffe (1893), Yiddish philologist
- William Robert Shepherd (1893), cartographer, historian
- John Driscoll Fitz-Gerald (1895), Hispanic scholar
- Joel Elias Spingarn (1895), professor of comparative literature
- Mortimer Lamson Earle (1896), classical scholar
- Alfred L. Kroeber (1896), pioneering cultural anthropologist
- William Popper (1896), Orientalist and professor
- Frederick Paul Keppel (1898), educator, former president of the Carnegie Corporation of New York
- Frank Sutliff Hackett (1899), educator, founder of Riverdale Country School
- John Erskine (1900), Great Books pioneer
- Alexander Goldenweiser (1902), Russian-born anthropologist and sociologist
- Emanuel Goldenweiser (1903), economist and president of the American Economic Association
- Robert Livingston Schuyler (1903), scholar on American history, president of the American Historical Association
- Carlton J. H. Hayes (1904), pioneering cultural historian; former U.S. ambassador to Spain
- Edward Sapir (1904), linguist and co-creator of the Sapir–Whorf hypothesis
- Frank Speck (1904), anthropologist, professor at the University of Pennsylvania
- William Stuart Messer (1905), professor of Latin at Dartmouth College, recipient of a 1922 Rome Prize
- Mark Raymond Harrington (1907), curator at the Southwest Museum of the American Indian and owner of the Rómulo Pico Adobe
- Edwin Borchard (1908), international legal scholar; Sterling Professor at the Yale Law School
- Richard F. Bach (1909), curator with the Metropolitan Museum of Art
- Rhys Carpenter (1909), classical art historian and professor at Bryn Mawr College
- F. Stuart Chapin (1909), sociologist and former president of the American Sociological Association
- Harold Gould Henderson (1910), Japanologist and former president of the Japan Society, founder of the Haiku Society of America
- Armin K. Lobeck (1911), cartographer
- Carl Zigrosser (1911), curator of the Philadelphia Museum of Art
- Lawrence K. Frank (1912), social scientist; vice president of the Josiah Macy Jr. Foundation and co-initiator of the Macy conferences
- Arthur MacMahon (1912), political scientist, president of the American Political Science Association
- Clarence Manning (1912), prominent slavicist at Columbia University
- Parker LeRoy Moon (1913), professor and managing editor of the Political Science Quarterly
- Benjamin Graham (1914), economist who pioneered value investing
- Herbert Schneider (1915), German American professor of philosophy and religious studies scholar
- Irwin Edman (1916), philosopher
- Thomas Munro (1916), art historian at Case Western Reserve University and curator at Cleveland Museum of Art
- John Herman Randall Jr. (1918), philosopher
- Kenneth Burke* (1920), literary theorist and philosopher
- Thomas Ollive Mabbott (1920), professor of literature at Hunter College; expert on Edgar Allan Poe
- Richard McKeon (1920), philosopher
- Frank Tannenbaum (1920), Austrian-American historian, sociologist, and criminologist; founder of the Labeling theory in criminology
- Fritz Roethlisberger (1921), management theorist at Harvard Business School
- Louis M. Hacker (1922), professor of economics and proponent of adult education
- Yuan Tung-li (1922), former director of the National Library of China, Peking University professor
- Mortimer Adler* (1923), philosopher and Great Books pioneer
- Robert Beverly Hale (1923), curator of American paintings at the Metropolitan Museum of Art
- Alexander Lesser (1923), anthropologist known for his documentation of the Kitsai language
- Arthur V. Loughren (1923), electrical engineer, former president of the Institute of Radio Engineers
- Leslie White (1923), anthropologist known for his theories of the evolution of culture and for the scientific study of culture
- John Gassner (1924), historian of theater, Sterling Professor at Yale University
- Meyer Schapiro (1924), art historian
- Joseph Campbell (1925), mythologist
- Jerome Klein (1925), art historian and co-founder of the American Artists' Congress
- William York Tindall (1925), James Joyce scholar at Columbia University
- Lionel Trilling (1925), literary critic
- Dwight C. Miner (1926), historian
- Jacques Barzun (1927), cultural historian
- Elliott Van Kirk Dobbie, historian, scholar of Anglo-Saxon literature
- Robert C. Schnitzer (1927), arts teacher and administrator
- Francis Steegmuller (1927), Flaubert scholar
- Gustave Von Groschwitz (1927), former director of the Carnegie Museum of Art
- Carl Benjamin Boyer (1928), historian of science and mathematics
- Leon Keyserling (1928), head of the Council of Economic Advisers under Harry S Truman
- Edgar Lorch (1928), mathematics department chairman at Columbia University
- Junius Bird (1930), archaeologist and former curator of South American Archaeology at the American Museum of Natural History
- Eli Ginzberg (1930), professor of economics at Columbia University
- Niels Henry Sonne (1930), rare book collector and head librarian at General Theological Seminary
- Maxwell Geismar (1931), literary critic, author, and professor at Sarah Lawrence College
- Francis Joseph Murray (1932), mathematician who developed the Von Neumann algebra with John von Neumann
- Walter H. Rubsamen (1933), professor of a musicology at the University of California, Los Angeles
- Joseph Leon Blau (1934), professor of religion at Columbia University
- M. A. Fitzsimons (1934), historian at the University of Notre Dame, editor of The Review of Politics
- Alan Gewirth (1934), philosopher, professor of philosophy at the University of Chicago, author of Reason and Morality
- Robert M. Adams (1935), Kafka scholar and professor at the University of California, Los Angeles
- Frederick Hartt (1935), Michelangelo expert, professor at University of Virginia, member of the Monuments, Fine Arts, and Archives program
- Herbert Aptheker (1936), Marxist historian and political activist
- Maurice Matloff (1936), chief historian of the United States Army 1970–1981
- John Alexander Moore (1936), professor of zoology at University of California, Riverside
- Joseph Greenberg (1936), prominent linguist known for work in linguistic typology and genetic classification of languages
- Carl E. Schorske (1936), cultural historian and winner of the 1981 Pulitzer Prize for History
- Quentin Anderson (1937), cultural historian and literary critic
- Charles Frankel (1937), political philosopher, assistant secretary of state for educational and cultural affairs
- Herbert Hyman (1939), sociologist and expert on opinion polling
- Herbert E. Klarman (1939), professor of the economics of healthcare at New York University
- Barry Ulanov (1939), English professor and scholar of jazz and religion
- Robert J. Alexander (1940), political activist, writer, and professor at Rutgers University
- John Hine Mundy (1940), British-American medievalist, professor at Columbia University, former president of the Medieval Academy of America
- Donald Barr (1941), educator and author; former headmaster of Dalton School; initiated the Columbia University Science Honors Program
- Ted de Bary (1941), East Asian studies expert and provost of Columbia University
- Leon Henkin (1941), mathematician and logician at University of California, Berkeley
- Donald Keene (1942), scholar of Japanese culture
- Robert Lekachman (1942), economist
- Philip Yampolsky (1942), scholar of Zen Buddhism
- Francesco Cordasco (1943), professor of education at Montclair State University
- Bernard Russell Gelbaum (1943), professor of mathematics at University of California, Irvine
- Martin S. James (1943), art historian, translator of Piet Mondrian
- Martin J. Klein (1943), historian of science and recipient of the Abraham Pais Prize for History of Physics
- Bernard Weisberger (1943), historian of the Reconstruction Era
- Alan Hoffman (1944), mathematician known for constructing the Hoffman–Singleton graph
- Bruce Mazlish (1944), historian and professor at Massachusetts Institute of Technology, son-in-law of David Rockefeller
- Richard Popkin (1944), philosopher
- Jack Greenberg (1945), counsel for the NAACP, in which capacity he argued Brown v. Board of Education; former professor at Columbia Law School and dean of Columbia College
- Murray Rothbard (1945), leading exponent of the Austrian School of economics
- Gilbert Y. Steiner (1945), scholar of social policy and fourth president of the Brookings Institution
- Richard Heffner (1946), professor and host of The Open Mind
- Fritz Stern (1946), Seth Low Professor of History Emeritus; pre-eminent in German studies
- George Herbert Borts (1947), economist at Brown University and managing editor of The American Economic Review 1969–1980
- William Bell Dinsmoor Jr. (1947), Classical archaeologist and architectural historian
- John Michael Montias (1947), economist and art historian at Yale University
- Harold E. Pagliaro (1947), professor of English literature at Swarthmore College
- Howard Stein (1947), philosopher at the University of Chicago
- Lambros Comitas (1948), anthropologist
- Elihu Katz (1948), sociologist and communication scholar, known for developing the two-step flow of communication theory
- Norman Kelvin (1948), literary scholar, professor at City College of New York and Graduate Center, CUNY
- Victorino Tejera (1948), professor of philosophy and comparative literature at Stony Brook University
- Uriel Weinreich (1948), linguist and professor at Columbia University
- Albert Elsen (1949), professor at Stanford University and Auguste Rodin expert
- Donald M. Friedman (1949), professor of Renaissance literature at University of California, Berkeley
- Marvin Harris (1949), anthropologist famous for developing cultural materialism
- Anthony Leeds (1949), anthropologist, professor at Boston University
- Robert F. Murphy (1949), professor of anthropology at Columbia University
- Arthur Melvin Okun (1949), chairman of the Council of Economic Advisers, proposed Okun's law
- William Rubin (1949), curator at the Museum of Modern Art
- James P. Shenton (1949), historian, professor of Columbia University, mentor of Bancroft Prize winners
- John D. Rosenberg (1950), scholar of Victorian literature, professor at Columbia University
- Burton Watson (1950), scholar and translator of Chinese and Japanese literature
- George Keller (1951), professor of higher education studies at the University of Pennsylvania
- Joseph Rothschild (1951), professor of Central European and Eastern European history at Columbia University
- Immanuel Wallerstein (1951), sociologist who defined world-systems theory
- A. James Gregor (1952), professor of political science at the University of California, Berkeley
- George Kateb (1952), professor of political science at Princeton University
- Elliott Mendelson (1952), logician; professor of mathematics at Queens College, City University of New York
- Andrew P. Vayda (1952), professor emeritus of anthropology and ecology at Rutgers University
- Melvin Ember (1953), professor of the City University of New York and editor of Cross-Cultural Research
- Julian Wolpert (1953), professor of urban planning at the Princeton School of Public and International Affairs
- Demetrios James Caraley (1954), editor of Political Science Quarterly and president of the Academy of Political Science
- Peter Kenen (1954), provost, Columbia University and expert in Optimum currency area theory
- Henry Littlefield (1954), educator, author, historian who initiated political interpretations of The Wonderful Wizard of Oz
- Stephen Orgel (1954), Shakespeare and Renaissance literature scholar
- David Rosand (1954), art historian, Columbia University
- Haldon Chase (1955), Denver-based archeologist, early figure of the Beat Generation
- Warren I. Cohen (1955), historian at University of Maryland, Baltimore County
- Harry N. Scheiber (1955), professor and director of the Institute for Legal Research at the UC Berkeley School of Law
- Jerry Fodor (1956), philosopher at Rutgers University
- Roy Lubove (1956), professor of social welfare at the University of Pittsburgh
- Seymour J. Mandelbaum (1956), professor at the University of Pennsylvania School of Design
- Kenneth Silverman (1956), professor at New York University and Pulitzer Prize-winning biographer
- Robert Alter (1957), professor of Hebrew and comparative literature at the University of California, Berkeley; president of the Association of Literary Scholars, Critics, and Writers
- Stanley Corngold (1957), professor of literature at Princeton University
- George Dargo (1957), legal scholar, professor at New England Law Boston
- Erich S. Gruen (1957), classicist and ancient historian; president of the Society for Classical Studies in 1992
- Stanley Insler (1957), philologist and professor at Yale University
- Jonathan Lubin (1957), professor of mathematics at Brown University; introduced Lubin–Tate formal group law
- Robert Chazan (1958), professor of Judaic studies at New York University
- Gerald Feldman (1958), historian who specializes in 20th-century German history; professor at University of California, Berkeley
- Robert M. Fogelson (1958), urban historian at Massachusetts Institute of Technology
- Robert W. Hanning (1958), professor of English literature at Columbia University
- Neil Harris (1958), professor of art history at the University of Chicago
- Joachim Neugroschel (1958), prolific multilingual translator
- David Rothman (1958), professor of social medicine and president of the Institute on Medicine as a Profession
- John Clubbe (1959), professor of English at the University of Kentucky
- Benjamin Cohen (1959), political economist and authority on International political economy
- Richard Fremantle (1959), Anglo-American art historian, son of writer Anne Fremantle
- Robert Nozick (1959), libertarian philosopher known for his book Anarchy, State, and Utopia
- Isser Woloch (1959), historian of the French Revolution
- Arnold A. Offner (1959), professor of history at Lafayette College and past president of Society for Historians of American Foreign Relations
- Riordan Roett (1959), political scientist and Latin American specialist at Johns Hopkins University
- Bruce M. Stave (1959), historian specializing in oral history and urban history
- Alvin Goldman (1960), professor of philosophy at Rutgers University and leading figure in epistemology
- William Landes (1960), economist and professor at University of Chicago Law School
- Rudolf Makkreel (1960), professor of philosophy at Emory University
- Thomas Vargish (1960), professor of English at Dartmouth College
- Eugene Bardach (1961), public policy scholar, professor at University of California, Berkeley
- Marshall Berman (1961), urbanologist
- Martin Eidelberg (1961), art historian at Rutgers University
- David Konstan (1961), professor of classics at New York University
- Victor Hao Li (1961), professor at Stanford Law School, president of East–West Center 1981–1989
- Donald F. Roberts (1961), professor of communications at Stanford University
- David Syrett (1961), professor of military history at Queens College, City University of New York; former president of the New York Military Affairs Symposium
- Zvi Gitelman (1962), Jewish scholar at the University of Michigan
- Ken Jowitt (1962), political scientist and professor at University of California, Berkeley and senior fellow of the Hoover Institution
- Stephen Koss (1962), historian on British history
- Joel Moses (1962), mathematician, Institute Professor at and provost of the Massachusetts Institute of Technology
- Lawrence S. Wittner (1962), historian on peace movements
- Peter Winn (1962), professor of history at Tufts University
- Richard Alba (1963), sociologist, professor at Graduate Center, CUNY
- David Berlinski (1963), mathematician, professor
- Eric Foner (1963), preeminent historian of Reconstruction, winner of the Pulitzer Prize for History and former president of American Historical Association
- David Orme-Johnson (1963), professor of psychology at the Maharishi University of Management
- Michael Klare (1963), professor of security studies at Hampshire College
- Victor Margolin (1963), professor of design history at the University of Illinois at Chicago
- Jonah Raskin (1963), writer, professor on counterculture
- Howard Spodek (1963), historian specializing in urban studies; professor at Temple University
- Robert J. Art (1964), professor of international relations at Brandeis University
- Richard P. Appelbaum (1964), professor of sociology at University of California, Santa Barbara
- Jonathan R. Cole (1964), sociologist and provost of Columbia University 1989–2003
- Peter S. Donaldson (1964), professor of English literature at the Massachusetts Institute of Technology
- Richard Epstein (1964), libertarian law scholar
- Richard S. Kayne (1964), professor of linguistics at New York University
- Peter Kolchin (1964), professor at the University of Delaware and winner of the 1988 Bancroft Prize
- John H. Langbein (1964), Sterling Professor at Yale Law School
- Peter K. Machamer (1964), philosopher and historian of science; professor at the University of Pittsburgh
- Mike Wallace (1964), historian and winner of the 1999 Pulitzer Prize for History for Gotham: A History of New York City to 1898
- Jonathan Goldberg (1964), professor at Emory University
- Michael M. Gunter (1964), professor at Tennessee Technological University, authority in Kurdish studies
- Miles Orvell (1964), professor at Temple University, former editor of the Encyclopedia of American Studies
- Jonathan M. Weiss (1964), scholar of French literature and politics
- George R. Goldner (1965), former curator at the Metropolitan Museum of Art
- J. Bruce Jacobs (1965), Australian orientalist who specialized in Taiwan studies, professor at Monash University
- Richard Kagan (1965), historian, professor of Spanish history at Johns Hopkins University
- Richard Taruskin (1965), musicologist
- Walter Reich (1965), former director of United States Holocaust Memorial Museum and professor at George Washington University
- Mark Steiner (1965), professor of philosophy at the Hebrew University of Jerusalem
- Raymond Geuss (1966), specialist in Jürgen Habermas
- Steven Handel (1966), restoration ecologist, professor at Rutgers University
- Michael Hechter (1966), professor of political science at Arizona State University
- Ira Katznelson (1966), political scientist and historian, professor at Columbia University
- Mark D. Naison (1966), former political activist; professor of history at Fordham University
- T. J. Pempel (1966), professor of political science and former director of the Institute of Asian Studies at the University of California, Berkeley
- Roger Sanjek (1966), professor of anthropology at Queens College, City University of New York
- David Weissbrodt (1966), legal scholar at the University of Minnesota Law School known for drafting the Minnesota Protocol
- Jay Winter (1966), World War I specialist at Yale University
- Paul Gewirtz (1967), constitutional law scholar
- Karl Klare (1967), critical legal studies theorist
- Norman Friedman (1967), author and naval analyst
- Mott T. Greene (1967), historian of science, professor at University of Puget Sound
- Reza Sheikholeslami (1967), Soudavar Professor of Persian Studies at Wadham College, Oxford
- Jeremy Siegel (1967), professor of the Wharton School of the University of Pennsylvania
- Terrell Carver (1968), political theorist; professor at the University of Bristol
- Samuel R. Gross (1968), professor at the University of Michigan Law School; editor of the National Registry of Exonerations project
- Charles Lindholm (1968), University Professor of Anthropology at Boston University
- Alfred W. McCoy (1968), historian of Southeast Asia; professor at the University of Wisconsin–Madison
- Lawrence Susskind (1968), urban planner and mediator; professor at the Massachusetts Institute of Technology
- Jerry Avorn (1969), professor at the Harvard Medical School
- William Boone Bonvillian (1969), scholar of innovation technology policy, former director of MIT's Washington, D.C. office
- Chris Iijima (1969), legal scholar, folksinger
- Andrei Markovits (1969), professor of comparative politics at the University of Michigan
- Michel Rosenfeld (1969), constitutional law scholar
- Mark Rosenzweig (1969), professor of economics at Yale University
- Steven M. Cohen (1970), sociologist, director of Berman Jewish Policy Archive at NYU's Robert F. Wagner Graduate School of Public Service
- Sheldon Danziger (1970), political scientist at the University of Michigan
- Lennard J. Davis (1970), professor of English at the University of Illinois at Chicago, specialist in disability studies
- John D'Emilio (1970), professor of history and gender studies at the University of Illinois at Chicago; winner of the Bill Whitehead Award in 2013
- Samuel Estreicher (1970), professor at the New York University School of Law
- Peter Grossman (1970), professor of economics at Butler University; columnist, The Indianapolis Star
- Robert A. Leonard (1970), forensic linguist at Hofstra University and former member of rock band Sha Na Na
- Michael P. Mezzatesta (1970), art historian, director of the Nasher Museum of Art 1987–2003
- Paul Starr (1970), sociologist; co-founder of The American Prospect and winner of the 1984 Pulitzer Prize for General Nonfiction
- Paul Berman (1971), historian and social critic
- Philip Nord (1971), historian and professor at Princeton University
- Steven J. Ross (1971), historian and professor at University of Southern California, 2018 Pulitzer Prize for History finalist
- Roy Rosenzweig (1971), historian and director of the Center for History and New Media at George Mason University
- Scott Atran (1972), anthropologist; director at Centre National de la Recherche Scientifique and presidential scholar at John Jay College of Criminal Justice
- Joel Black (1972), literature and film scholar
- Michael Gerrard (1972), professor at Columbia Law School
- Jerome Groopman (1972), Harvard Medical School professor and medical writer for The New Yorker
- Robert Hymes (1972), professor of Chinese history at Columbia University, winner of two Joseph Levenson Book Prizes
- George Klosko (1972), professor of philosophy at the University of Virginia
- Mark J. Roe (1972), professor at Harvard Law School
- John Servos (1972), professor and historian of science; president of the History of Science Society
- David Stern (1972), professor of Hebrew literature at Harvard University
- Tom R. Tyler (1972), professor of psychology at Yale Law School
- Harold Aram Veeser (1972), professor at City College of New York, known for contribution to new historicism
- Sean Wilentz (1972), historian and winner of the Bancroft Prize; chair of American Studies at Princeton University
- Angelo Falcón (1973), political scientist, president and founder of the National Institute for Latino Policy
- Steven Messner (1973), sociologist, professor of the University at Albany, SUNY, former president of the American Society of Criminology
- William C. Sharpe (1973), professor of English at Barnard College
- Stewart Sterk (1973), professor of law at the Benjamin N. Cardozo School of Law
- Richard Briffault (1974), professor of law at Columbia Law School
- David S. Katz (1974), professor of early modern European history at Tel Aviv University
- James R. Russell (1974), professor of Ancient Near Eastern studies at Harvard University
- Steven Simon (1974), Middle East expert and former executive director of International Institute for Strategic Studies-US; former senior director in the United States National Security Council
- Haruo Shirane (1974), professor of Japanese literature of Columbia University
- Jonathan Crary (1975), art critic, essayist, professor of art at Columbia University
- Robert S. Levine (1975), professor of American literature at University of Maryland, College Park
- Alexander J. Motyl (1975), professor of political science at Rutgers University
- David Albert (1976), professor of philosophy at Columbia University
- Louis Putterman (1976), professor of economics at Brown University
- Thomas Alan Schwartz (1976), professor of history at Vanderbilt University
- Barry Bergdoll (1977), chief curator of Architecture and Design at the Museum of Modern Art
- M. Gregg Bloche (1977), professor at Georgetown University Law Center
- Franco Mormando (1977), historian of Italy, professor at Boston College
- James S. Shapiro (1977), Shakespearean authority
- Peter Christopher (1978), writer and professor at Georgia Southern University
- Jorge Duany (1978), director of the Cuban Research Institute and professor of anthropology at Florida International University
- Jay M. Harris (1978), professor of Jewish studies at Harvard University
- William D. Hartung (1978), director of the Arms & Security Project at the Center for International Policy
- Kevin Salatino (1978), curator at Art Institute of Chicago, former director of the Bowdoin College Museum of Art and Huntington Library's art collection
- Jeffry Frieden (1979), professor and department chair of political science at Harvard University
- Steve Fuller (1979), philosopher, sociologist in the field of science and technology studies
- Alexander George (1979), professor of philosophy at Amherst College; founder of AskPhilosophers.org
- Timothy Gilfoyle (1979), professor of history at Loyola University Chicago
- Mark Statman (1980), professor emeritus of literary studies at Eugene Lang College of Liberal Arts
- Sahotra Sarkar (1981), professor of philosophy at the University of Texas at Austin
- Alan Tansman (1981), scholar of Japanese literature at University of California, Berkeley
- Michael Bérubé (1982), professor of literature and cultural studies
- David Makovsky (1982), Middle East Scholar
- Eugene Rogan (1982), professor and director of St Antony's College, Oxford's Middle East Centre
- James L. Gelvin (1983), professor of history at University of California, Los Angeles
- Mark Ravina (1983), professor of Japanese history at the University of Texas at Austin
- Jonathan Zimmerman (1983), professor of History of Education at the University of Pennsylvania Graduate School of Education
- Gideon Rosen (1984), professor of philosophy at Princeton University
- Jordan Sand (1984), professor Japanese history at Georgetown University
- Thomas Sugrue (1984), historian of the 20th century United States
- Jamsheed Choksy (1985), chair of Eurasian studies at Indiana University Bloomington
- Noam Elkies (1985), mathematician, youngest full professor at Harvard
- William Deresiewicz (1985), literary critic
- Louis Warren (1985), professor of Western U.S. history at the University of California, Davis
- Alexander Argüelles (1986), polyglot and professor at the American University in the Emirates; son of poet Ivan Argüelles
- Tobias Hecht (1986), anthropologist, ethnographer, and translator; winner of the 2002 Margaret Mead Award
- Alva Noë (1986), professor of philosophy at University of California, Berkeley
- Anthony B. Pinn (1986), professor of religion at Rice University
- Ritu Birla (1987), historian of modern South Asia, director of University of Toronto's Asian Institute
- Scott J. Shapiro (1987), professor of law and philosophy at Yale Law School, director of the Yale Center for Law and Philosophy
- Irene Tucker (1987), literary critic, professor at University of California, Irvine
- Katherine B. Crawford (1988), professor of gender studies and history at Vanderbilt University
- Leslie M. Harris (1988), expert on African-American history at Northwestern University
- Claudio Saunt (1989), professor at the University of Georgia, author of Unworthy Republic
- Nicholas Birns (1988), Tolkien scholar
- William H. Sherman (1988), director of the Warburg Institute, University of London
- Stephanie Stebich (1988), director of Smithsonian American Art Museum
- Stephanos Bibas (1989), professor of law and criminology at the University of Pennsylvania Law School, judge for the United States Court of Appeals for the Third Circuit
- Karen Chapple (1989), scholar of Urban planning at University of California, Berkeley
- Jesús Escobar (1989), professor of Art History at Northwestern University, expert in early modern art of Spain and Italy
- Daniel Halberstam (1989), professor of law at the University of Michigan Law School
- Stephanie Aaronson (1990), economist and vice president of Brookings Institution
- Rhea Anastas (1990), art historian, critic, curator and professor at University of California, Irvine
- Matthew Connelly (1990), professor of international and global history at Columbia University
- Juliet Koss (1990), art historian, professor at Scripps College
- Jennifer Lee (1990), sociologist, professor of Columbia University
- Catherine Prendergast (1990), professor of English at University of Illinois Urbana-Champaign
- Benjamin Frommer (1991), historian, professor at Northwestern University
- Mary Pattillo (1991), professor of African-American studies at Northwestern University
- Cynthia A. Young (1991), professor of African-American studies at Pennsylvania State University
- Robert T. Miller (1992), professor of law at the University of Iowa
- Matthew Shum (1992), professor of economics at California Institute of Technology
- Victor Fleischer (1993), professor of law at University of California, Irvine
- Valerie Purdie Greenaway (1993), professor of psychology and first African-American to receive tenure in the sciences at Columbia University
- Michelle Hartman (1993), professor of Arabic and francophone literature at McGill University
- Soyoung Lee (1993), chief curator of the Harvard Art Museums
- Seth Rockman (1993), professor at Brown University, co-recipient of the 2010 Merle Curti Award
- David Rosen (1993), professor at Trinity College, Connecticut, recipient of the 2013 James Russell Lowell Prize
- David Eisenbach (1994), historian on media and politics; narrator, 10 Things You Don't Know About
- François Furstenberg (1994), historian at Johns Hopkins University
- Katerina Harvati (1994), professor of paleoanthropology at the University of Tübingen, identified the earliest known sample of the remains of modern humans outside Africa
- Ayanna Thompson (1994), professor of English at Arizona State University, president of the Shakespeare Association of America
- David H. Webber (1995), professor of law at Boston University School of Law
- Barry Scott Wimpfheimer (1995), professor of religious studies at Northwestern University, expert on the Talmud
- Lara Bazelon (1996), professor of law at University of San Francisco School of Law
- Gabriella Coleman (1996), anthropologist known for her work in hacker culture and online activism; professor at McGill University
- Elena Conis (1996), historian of medicine at University of California, Berkeley
- Leah DeVun (1997), professor of gender studies at Rutgers University
- Jessica Greenberg (1997), social anthropologist and professor at University of Illinois at Urbana–Champaign
- Lauren Winner (1997), historian, professor at Duke Divinity School
- Brooke Holmes (1998), classicist, professor at Princeton University
- Alison Gass (1998), former chief curator of the Cantor Arts Center, director of the Smart Museum of Art and the Institute of Contemporary Art San José
- Louis Hyman (1999), economic historian, professor at Cornell University School of Industrial and Labor Relations, author of Debtor Nation
- Adrianne Wadewitz (1999), feminist scholar and noted Wikipedian
- Yehuda Kurtzer (2000), president of the Shalom Hartman Institute, son of ambassador Daniel C. Kurtzer
- Natalia Mehlman Petrzela (2000), professor of history at The New School
- Fotini Christia (2001), Greek political scientist, professor at Massachusetts Institute of Technology
- Joya Powell (2001), Bessie Awards-winning choreographer and educator
- Agnia Grigas (2002), political scientist and author
- Cassie Mogilner Holmes (2002), professor at the UCLA Anderson School of Management
- Daniel Immerwahr (2002), professor of history of Northwestern University and recipient of the Merle Curti Award
- Jessica Chiccehitto Hindman (2003), professor at Northern Kentucky University, National Book Critics Circle Award finalist
- Rujeko Hockley (2005), curator of the Whitney Museum of American Art and the 2019 Whitney Biennial
- Susanna Berger (2007), art historian, professor at University of Southern California
- Ashley James (2009), first black curator of the Solomon R. Guggenheim Museum

== University presidents and administrators ==
- John M. Mason (1789), provost of Columbia College and president of Dickinson College
- Philip Milledoler (1793), fifth president of Rutgers University
- Nathaniel Fish Moore (1802), eighth President of Columbia University
- Isaac Ferris (1816), third president of New York University
- James Hall Mason Knox (1841), 8th president of Lafayette College
- John Aikman Stewart (1841), businessman, banker, acting president of Princeton University
- John Howard Van Amringe (1860), mathematician and dean of Columbia College
- Seth Low (1870), president of Columbia University and mayor of New York City
- Nicholas Murray Butler (1882), president of Columbia University, chairman of the Carnegie Endowment for International Peace and Nobel Peace Prize winner, founder of Horace Mann School and the College Board
- Francis Lister Hawks Pott (1883), Episcopal missionary and president of St. John's University, Shanghai 1888–1941
- Thomas Fiske (1885), professor of mathematics at Columbia University; acting dean of Barnard College; president of the American Mathematical Society 1902–1904; secretary of the College Board
- Frank Pierrepont Graves (1890), former president of the University of Washington, University of Wyoming; commissioner of Education of the State of New York 1921–1940
- Frank D. Fackenthal (1906), acting president of Columbia University
- Dixon Ryan Fox (1911), Union College president 1934–1945
- Louis L. Kaplan (1922), acting chancellor of University of Maryland, Baltimore County and president of Baltimore Hebrew University
- Frederick Burkhardt (1933), president emeritus of the American Council of Learned Societies and third president of Bennington College
- James S. Coles (1936), ninth president of Bowdoin College
- William C. Fels (1937), fourth president of Bennington College
- George James (1937), commissioner of Health of the City of New York, dean of the Mount Sinai School of Medicine, president of Mount Sinai Health System
- James C. Fletcher (1940), president of the University of Utah and administrator of the National Aeronautics and Space Administration
- Herbert A. Deane (1942), political scientist, vice provost of Columbia University
- Martin Meyerson (1942), president of the University of Pennsylvania
- Henry S. Coleman (1946), acting dean of Columbia College, Columbia University during the Columbia University protests of 1968
- Steven Marcus (1948), George Delacorte Professor in the Humanities and dean of Columbia College
- Carl Hovde (1950), professor of English and dean of Columbia College following the Columbia University protests of 1968
- Rudolph H. Weingartner (1950), former provost of the University of Pittsburgh, former dean of the College of Arts and Sciences at Northwestern University
- Ralph Lowenstein (1951), dean of the University of Florida College of Journalism and Communications
- Michael I. Sovern (1951), president of Columbia University
- Richard N. Rosett (1953), dean of the University of Chicago Booth School of Business, Arts and Sciences at Washington University in St. Louis, and chairman of National Bureau of Economic Research
- Robert L. Friedheim (1955), former director of the USC School of International Relations
- Calvin B. T. Lee (1955), former chancellor of University of Maryland, Baltimore County and acting president of Boston University
- Robert E. Paaswell (1956), civil engineer, former interim president of City College of New York and CEO of Chicago Transit Authority
- Kenneth Gros Louis (1959), chancellor of Indiana University system
- Richard A. Merrill (1959), 7th dean of the University of Virginia School of Law
- Stephen Joel Trachtenberg (1959), president of the University of Hartford and of George Washington University
- David C. Levy (1960), dean of the Parsons School of Design and president of the Corcoran Gallery of Art
- Steven M. Cahn (1966), provost and acting president of Graduate Center of the City University of New York
- Dimitri B. Papadimitriou (1970), executive vice president and provost of Bard College
- David Rubin (1970), professor of communications and dean of S. I. Newhouse School of Public Communications
- Alan Cooper (1971), provost of Jewish Theological Seminary of America, former member of Sha Na Na
- William Germano (1972), dean of the faculty of humanities and social sciences at Cooper Union, former editor-in-chief of Columbia University Press
- Saul Levmore (1973), commercial law scholar, former dean of the University of Chicago Law School
- Ronald Mason Jr. (1974), president of the University of the District of Columbia and former president of Southern University
- Reynold Verret (1976), president of Xavier University of Louisiana
- Gregory F. Ball (1977), psychologist, dean of the University of Maryland College of Behavioral and Social Sciences
- Thomas Worcester (1977), Jesuit academic, president of Regis College, Toronto, professor of the University of Toronto
- Alan Kadish (1977), president of the Touro College and University System
- Ralph Keen (1979), professor and dean of the honors college at the University of Illinois at Chicago
- Colin Crawford (1980), 24th dean of the University of Louisville School of Law and incoming dean of the Golden Gate University School of Law
- Samuel Hoi (1980), president of the Maryland Institute College of Art
- Daniel Gordis (1981), vice president of Shalem College, Israel's first liberal arts college
- Mark C. Gordon (1981), first president and dean of the Mitchell Hamline School of Law, former president of Defiance College and dean of the University of Detroit Mercy School of Law
- Donald S. Siegel (1981), economist and director of the School of Public Affairs at Arizona State University
- Deborah Waxman (1989), president of Reconstructionist Rabbinical College and Jewish Reconstructionist Communities
- Jonathan H. Earle (1990), dean of Roger Hadfield Ogden Honors College at Louisiana State University
- Melissa Michelson (1990), dean of arts and sciences at Menlo College
- Melanie Jacobs (1991), dean of the University of Louisville School of Law and Michigan State University College of Law
- Ashish Jha (1992), dean of the Brown University School of Public Health and former professor of the Harvard T.H. Chan School of Public Health
- Sarah Bunin Benor (1997), vice provost of Hebrew Union College – Jewish Institute of Religion, recipient of 2019 Sami Rohr Choice Award for Jewish Literature

== Actors ==
- John B. Mason (1880), stage actor
- Ralph Morgan (1904), co-founder of Actors Equity and first president of the Screen Actors Guild
- Nat Pendleton (1916), portrayer of Eugen Sandow in The Great Ziegfeld and silver-medal wrestler in the 1920 Summer Olympics
- James Cagney* (1922), winner of the Academy Award for his portrayal of George M. Cohan in Yankee Doodle Dandy
- Roger De Koven* (c. late 1920s), actor on stage, radio, film and TV; star of Peabody Award-winning radio drama Against the Storm
- Cornel Wilde* (1933), star of The Greatest Show on Earth, Beach Red, and Academy Award nominee for A Song to Remember
- Richard Ney (1940), actor, Mrs. Miniver; husband of Greer Garson
- Dolph Sweet (1948), played Carl Canisky in Gimme a Break!
- Sorrell Booke (1949), played Boss Hogg in The Dukes of Hazzard
- Stephen Strimpell (1954), star of Mister Terrific
- George Segal (1955), star of Who's Afraid of Virginia Woolf?, Ship of Fools and Just Shoot Me!, winner of the Golden Globe Award for New Star of the Year – Actor in 1965 Golden Globe Award for Best Actor – Motion Picture Musical or Comedy in 1973
- Brian Dennehy (1960), winner of the Tony Award and the Golden Globe Award for Best Actor – Miniseries or Television Film for Death of a Salesman
- Don Briscoe (1962), actor, Dark Shadows
- Roger Davis (1962), actor, Dark Shadows, Alias Smith and Jones
- William Finley (1963), film actor; co-star of Phantom of the Paradise
- Jared Martin (1965), actor, Dallas
- Ben Stein (1966), host of Win Ben Stein's Money; speechwriter for former US President Richard M. Nixon
- Gerrit Graham* (1970), film actor and songwriter
- Ed Harris* (1973), Academy Award-nominated actor and director, Apollo 13, The Truman Show, Pollock, Westworld
- Richard Thomas* (1973), star of The Waltons
- Robert Wisdom (1976), actor, Nashville, The Wire, Prison Break
- Mario Van Peebles (1978), star of Heartbreak Ridge and Sonny Spoon
- Jack Koenig (1981), actor
- Matt Salinger (1983), actor son of J.D. Salinger
- Robert Maschio (1988), actor on Scrubs
- Matthew Fox (1989), star of Party of Five and Lost
- Soterios Johnson (1990), radio journalist and WNYC host
- Schuyler Grant (1993), actress, great-niece of Katharine Hepburn
- Rachel DeWoskin (1994), actress and author, Foreign Babes in Beijing
- Jean Louisa Kelly (1994), star of Mr. Holland's Opus
- Amanda Peet (1994), star of the TV series Jack & Jill and Studio 60 on the Sunset Strip, and the film The Whole Nine Yards
- Cara Buono (1995), star of Third Watch and Stranger Things
- Casey Affleck (1998), Golden Globe and Academy Award-nominated actor for The Assassination of Jesse James by the Coward Robert Ford, and actor in Good Will Hunting and Ocean's Eleven
- Maggie Gyllenhaal (1999), Golden Globe-winning actress for The Honourable Woman, and star in Secretary, Stranger than Fiction and The Dark Knight
- Ebon Moss-Bachrach (1999), actor, Girls
- Liza Weil (1999), actress, The Gilmore Girls
- Amir Arison (2000), actor in The Blacklist
- Charlotte Newhouse (2001), actress and producer of Comedy Central's Idiotsitter
- Jesse Bradford (2002), actor in Flags of Our Fathers and Bring It On
- Jake Gyllenhaal* (2002), Academy Award-nominated actor for Brokeback Mountain, star of Jarhead and Donnie Darko
- Brandon Victor Dixon (2003), Tony Award-nominated broadway actor starring in Scottsboro Boys
- Rachel Nichols (2003), actress, Continuum, G.I. Joe: The Rise of Cobra
- Jenny Slate (2004), cast member, Saturday Night Live
- Anna Paquin* (2004), winner of the Academy Award for The Piano
- Rider Strong (2004), star of Boy Meets World
- Julia Jones (2005), actress in The Twilight Saga and Dexter: New Blood
- Julia Stiles (2005), star of Save the Last Dance and Mona Lisa Smile
- Kate McKinnon (2006), Emmy winning actress and comedian, Saturday Night Live
- Grace Parra (2006), actress, screenwriter, TV host
- Emmy Rossum* (2008), Golden Globe-nominated actress of The Phantom of the Opera and The Day After Tomorrow
- Hal Scardino (2008), child actor known for his role in The Indian in the Cupboard
- Jeremy Blackman (2009), appeared in Magnolia
- Max Minghella (2009), appeared in Syriana and Art School Confidential
- Spencer Treat Clark (2010), appeared in Gladiator, Mystic River, and Unbreakable
- Asher Grodman (2010), actor, Ghosts
- Sarah Steele (2011), actress, Spanglish
- Remy Zaken (2012), actress on Spring Awakening
- Jin Ha (2013), actor, Love Life, Devs
- Devyn Tyler (2013), actress, Clarice and Snowfall
- Gabby Beans (2014), actress, Tony Award for Best Actress in a Play nominee
- Kelsey Chow (2014), actress, Pair of Kings
- Cinta Laura (2014), actress and singer
- Sofia Vassilieva (2014), actress, Eloise at the Plaza, Eloise at Christmastime
- Marjana Chowdhury (2015), model, actress, philanthropist and beauty queen
- Hari Nef (2015), transgender model, actress, and writer; signed to IMG Models
- Ben Platt* (2016), actor and singer, Pitch Perfect, The Book of Mormon, Dear Evan Hansen, transferred to Columbia University School of General Studies
- Katie Chang* (2017), actress, The Bling Ring, A Birder's Guide to Everything
- Timothée Chalamet* (2017), Academy Award-nominated actor, Call Me by Your Name
- Sami Gayle (2018), actress, Blue Bloods, Candy Jar, Vampire Academy
- Kenny Ridwan (2021), actor, The Goldbergs
- Emily Robinson (2021), actress, The Orphans' Home Cycle, Eighth Grade
- Kiera Allen (2022), actress, Run
- Peyton Elizabeth Lee (2026), actress, Andi Mack
- Avantika Vandanapu (2027), actress, Mean Girls

== Activists ==
- Samuel Cutler Ward (1831), lobbyist known as the "King of the Lobby"
- Henry Bergh* (1834), founder of the American Society for the Prevention of Cruelty to Animals and the Massachusetts Society for the Prevention of Cruelty to Children
- Arthur B. Spingarn (1897), civil rights activist; elected president of the National Association for the Advancement of Colored People 1940–1965; namesake of the Moorland–Spingarn Research Center at Howard University
- George Marshall (1926), political activist and conservationist
- John B. Trevor Jr. (1931), director and treasurer of the Pioneer Fund
- David Crook (1935), British-born Communist ideologue, activist, spy, husband of Isabel Crook, professor at Beijing Foreign Studies University
- Robert Gnaizda (1957), lawyer, activist, and co-founder of advocacy group Greenlining Institute
- Morris J. Amitay (1958), lobbyist, former executive director of the American Israel Public Affairs Committee and vice chairman of the Jewish Institute for National Security Affairs
- Richard Grossman (1965), critic and organizer against corporate power, former director of Greenpeace USA
- Brian Flanagan (1968), former member of the Students for a Democratic Society and Weather Underground
- David Gilbert (1966), leader of Students for a Democratic Society and participant in the deadly 1981 Brink's robbery with Kathy Boudin, the mother of his child Chesa Boudin
- Ted Gold* (1968), student activist, leader of the Students for a Democratic Society and member of the Weatherman group who died in the 1970 Greenwich Village townhouse explosion
- John Jacobs (1969), student activist, member of Students for a Democratic Society and the Weather Underground, went into hiding after the fatal 1970 Greenwich Village townhouse explosion
- Mark Rudd (1969), president of Students for a Democratic Society and member of the Weather Underground
- Stephen Donaldson (1970), bisexual political activist, founder of the Student Homophile League at Columbia, the oldest college LGBTQ organization in the world
- David Kaczynski (1970), anti-death penalty activist, brother of Unabomber Theodore Kaczynski
- Robert Roth* (1970), activist associated with the Students for a Democratic Society
- Sheena Wright (1990), CEO of the United Way of New York City
- David Kaiser (1991), philanthropist, environmental activist, president of the Rockefeller Family Fund, great-great-grandson of John D. Rockefeller
- Benjamin Jealous (1994), president of the NAACP
- Ai-jen Poo (1996), activist, recipient of the MacArthur Fellowship in 2014
- Risë Wilson (1997), activist
- Anna Baltzer (2002), activist for Palestinian human rights
- Ady Barkan (2006), activist and organizer for Center for Popular Democracy
- Tourmaline (2006), activist and filmmaker
- Emma Sulkowicz (2015), performance activist known for Mattress Performance (Carry That Weight) and Ceci N'est Pas Un Viol
- Coleman Hughes (2020), activist and writer on issues of race and racism
- Henry Williams (2022), political activist and chief of staff of the Mike Gravel 2020 presidential campaign

== Artists and architects ==
- James Renwick Jr. (1836), Gothic Revival architect who designed St. Patrick's Cathedral, New York
- Charles C. Haight (1861), architect who designed the old campus of Columbia University, numerous buildings at Yale University as well as the campus of General Theological Seminary
- Walter Satterlee (1863), figure and genre painter
- Lockwood de Forest* (1872), artist, interior and furniture designer
- Devereux Emmet (1883), pioneering golf course architect who designed the golf course at the Congressional Country Club
- Henry Martyn Congdon (1854), architect and designer
- William Ordway Partridge (1885), sculptor who built the statue of Thomas Jefferson at Columbia University, Kauffmann Memorial, and the statue of Pocahontas in Jamestown, Virginia
- Goodhue Livingston (1888), founder of the architectural firm Trowbridge & Livingston
- Henry Shrady (1894), sculptor known for the Ulysses S. Grant Memorial in Washington, D.C.
- Julian Clarence Levi (1896), architect, watercolorist, philanthropist
- Gilbert White (1900), painter
- Henry Rutgers Beekman (1903), watercolorist
- Ely Jacques Kahn (1904), commercial architect who designed the Municipal Asphalt Plant, the Film Center Building, 120 Wall Street, 399 Park Avenue, One Penn Plaza, and 1095 Avenue of the Americas
- Rockwell Kent* (1907), illustrator
- Eric Gugler (1911), architect who designed the current Oval Office
- Albert Mayer (1916), planner who designed the master plan of Chandigarh
- Isamu Noguchi* (1926), sculptor, namesake of the Noguchi table and Noguchi Museum, designer of the Moerenuma Park, Bayfront Park, and the Lillie and Hugh Roy Cullen Sculpture Garden
- Charles Alston (1929), artist
- Ad Reinhardt (1935), abstract expressionist artist and critic
- Arthur Rothstein (1935), photographer for the Farm Security Administration and Look magazine
- Vincent Kling (1938), architect, co-founder of KlingStubbins
- Ed Rice (1940), author, publisher, photojournalist and painter
- Charles Saxon (1940), cartoonist
- Burton Silverman (1949), painter
- George S. Zimbel (1951), photographer
- Jeh V. Johnson (1953), architect, and educator at Vassar College
- Frederick C. Baldwin (1955), photographer
- Edward Koren (1957), cartoonist
- John Giorno (1958), artist, subject of Andy Warhol's first movie, Sleep
- Robert A. M. Stern (1960), traditionalist architect, dean of the Yale School of Architecture
- Scott Burton (1962), urban sculptor
- Bernard Cywinski (1962), architect and co-founder of the firm Bohlin Cywinski Jackson, which designed the Liberty Bell center in Philadelphia, the Apple Fifth Avenue store, and the Seattle City Hall
- Stephen A. Lesser (1966), architect
- Gordon Gahan (1967)*, photographer for National Geographic
- Edwin Schlossberg (1967), designer, author, artist; husband of Caroline Kennedy
- Francis Levy (1969), comic book artist
- Greg Wyatt (1971), sculptor-in-residence at the Cathedral of St. John the Divine, known for designing the Peace Fountain
- Timothy Greenfield-Sanders (1974), photographer and documentary filmmaker
- Michael Middleton Dwyer (1975), architect known for his restoration works
- James Sanders (1976), architect who co-wrote New York: A Documentary Film with Ric Burns '78
- Ephraim Rubenstein (1978), artist
- Peter Pennoyer (1980), architect known for the renovation of the Colony Club and the Knickerbocker Club, great-great-grandson of J.P. Morgan
- John Arcudi (1983), cartoonist for DC Comics and creator of The Mask and Major Bummer
- Jacob Collins (1986), realist painter, founder of the Grand Central Academy of Art
- Lance Hosey (1987), architect, author of The Shape of Green; chief sustainability officer of the global architectural firm RTKL Associates
- Matthew Weinstein (1987), visual artist, son of physician I. Bernard Weinstein
- Christopher Payne (1990), photographer
- Peter Mendelsund (1991), creative director of The Atlantic, graphic designer
- Rachel Feinstein (1993), sculptor
- Alison Castle (1995), photographer and book editor, daughter of artist Wendell Castle
- Ricardo Cortés (1995), illustrator, It's Just a Plant
- Damon Winter (1997), Pulitzer Prize-winning photographer for The New York Times
- Damon Rich (1997), urban designer, 2017 MacArthur Fellow
- Nicola López (1998), artist, professor at the Columbia University School of the Arts
- Emily Abruzzo (2000), co-founder of Abruzzo Bodziak Architects
- Steffani Jemison (2003), artist
- Ariel Schrag (2003), cartoonist
- Amanda Phingbodhipakkiya (2010), Thai-American artist known for the project Beyond Curie

== Athletes ==
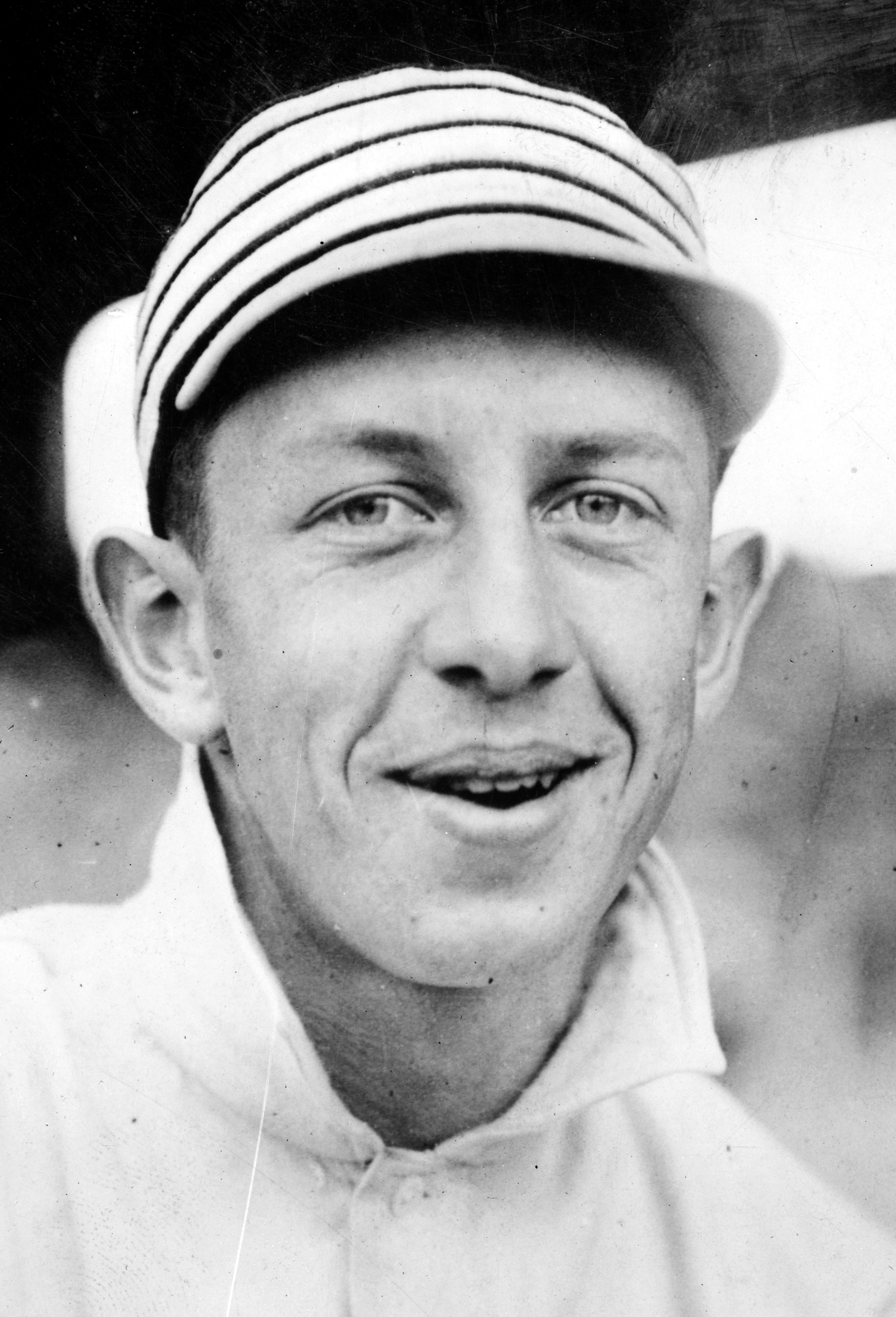
Hall of Famer Eddie Collins

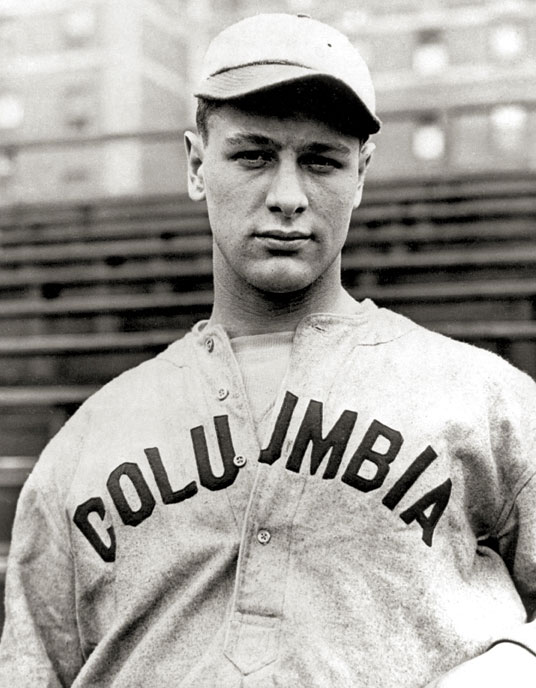
Hall of Famer Lou Gehrig

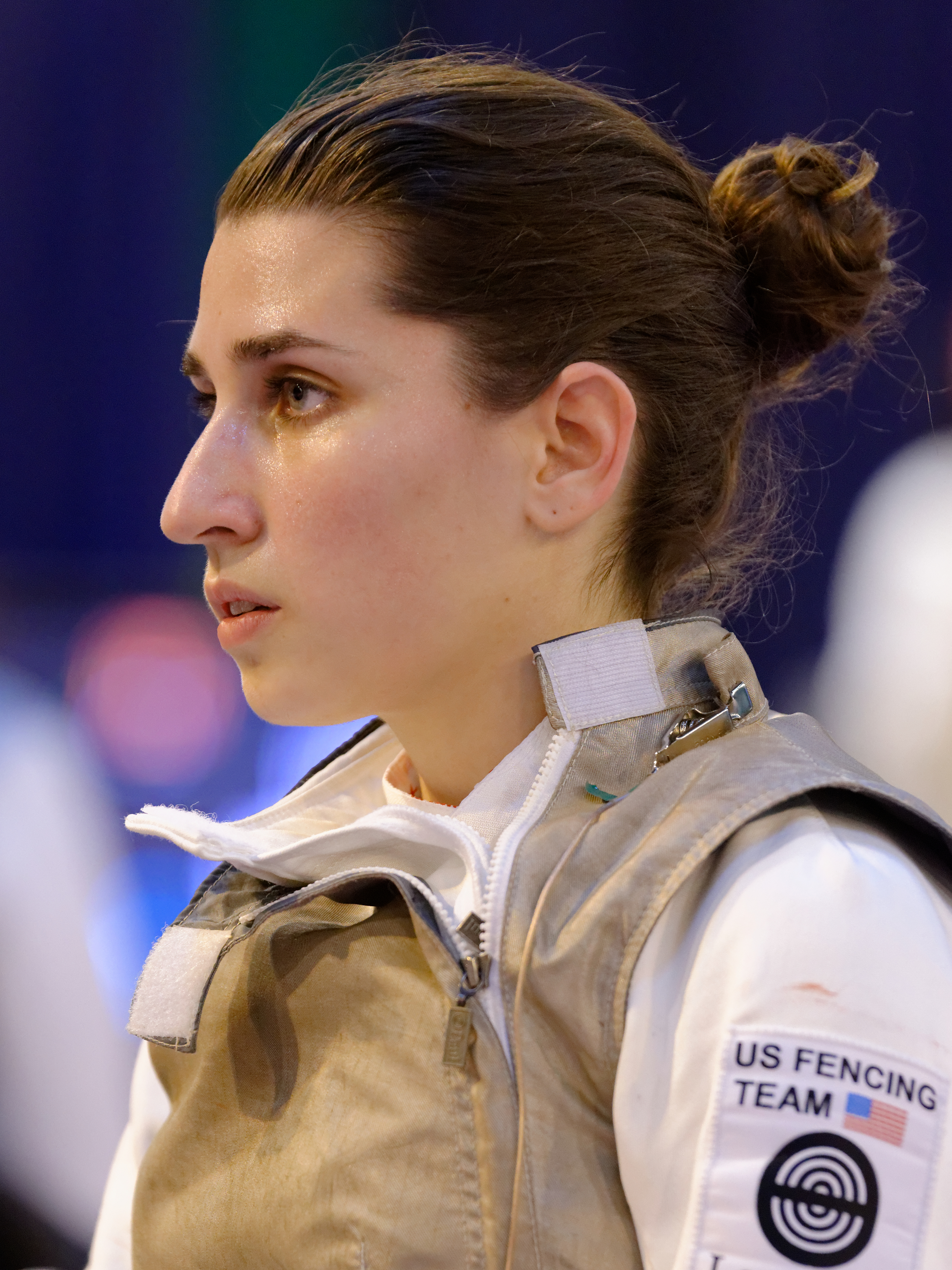
Olympian Nicole Ross

- John Cox Stevens (1803), founder and first commodore of the New York Yacht Club, won the first America's Cup trophy in 1851
- Reginald Sayre (1881), orthopedic surgeon and Olympic sport shooter
- Charles Sands (1887), athlete who won the gold medal in Golf at the 1900 Summer Olympics
- Oliver Campbell (1891), tennis player; youngest male winner of the US Open Singles title 1890–1990
- Charles Townsend (1893), first Olympic fencer from the Ivy League; silver medalist in the 1904 Summer Olympics
- Gustavus Town Kirby (1895), president of the United States Olympic Committee 1920–1924, and Amateur Athletic Union 1911–1913
- Leo Fishel (1899), first Jewish pitcher in Major League Baseball
- Harold Weekes (1903), football player for the Columbia Lions, member of the College Football Hall of Fame
- Harry A. Fisher (1905), basketball coach for Columbia, United States Military Academy, St. John's; member of the Basketball Hall of Fame
- Robert LeRoy (1905), two-time silver medalist in the 1904 Summer Olympics
- Eddie Collins (1907), baseball player for the Chicago White Sox and member of the Baseball Hall of Fame
- Marcus Hurley (1908), cyclist who won four gold medals in Cycling at the 1904 Summer Olympics
- Jay Gould II* (1911), real tennis player, Olympic gold medalist in 1908 and world champion 1914–1916; great-grandson of financier Jay Gould
- Ted Kiendl (1911), National Basketball Player of the Year in 1911; corporate lawyer, argued Erie Railroad Co. v. Tompkins before the Supreme Court in 1938
- George Smith (1916), pitcher for the Philadelphia Phillies
- Millard Bloomer (1920), Olympic fencer
- Harold Bloomer (1924), Olympic fencer
- Lou Gehrig* (1925), first baseman for the New York Yankees and member of the Baseball Hall of Fame
- Walter Koppisch (1925), football player for the New York Giants, member of the College Football Hall of Fame
- Ralph Furey (1928), football player, athletic director of Columbia University 1943–1968
- Art Smith (1928), baseball player for the Chicago White Sox
- Fresco Thompson (1928), baseball player for the Philadelphia Phillies
- Hugh Alessandroni (1929), Olympic bronze medalist fencer
- Norman Armitage (1931), Olympic bronze medalist fencer; first person to be inducted into the USFA Hall of Fame
- Lou Bender (1932), pioneer player with the Columbia Lions and in early pro basketball; later a successful trial attorney
- George Gregory Jr. (1933), first African-American basketball player to be selected as All-American
- Alfred Skrobisch (1933), Olympic fencer
- Cliff Montgomery (1934), led the Columbia Lions football team to victory in the Rose Bowl
- John O'Brien (1938), basketball player for the Akron Wingfoots
- Ben Johnson (1938), sprinter who rivaled Jesse Owens
- Sid Luckman (1939), NFL Hall of Fame Chicago Bears quarterback
- Ken Germann (1943), football coach, athletic director of Columbia University, and former Southern Conference commissioner
- Paul Governali (1943), football player for the Boston Yanks and New York Giants
- Walt Budko (1948), basketball player for Baltimore Bullets and Philadelphia Warriors
- Bruce Gehrke (1948), football player for New York Giants
- Bill Swiacki (1948), player for New York Giants, member of the College Football Hall of Fame
- Lou Kusserow (1949), football player for Hamilton Tiger-Cats and New York Yanks
- John Azary (1951), basketball player, recipient of the Haggerty Award
- Jack Molinas (1953), NBA player for the Fort Wayne Pistons
- Jack Rohan (1953), head coach of the Columbia Lions men's basketball team 1961–1974, and 1990–1995
- George Shaw (1953), Olympic triple jumper
- Richard Ballantine* (1967), cyclist and cycling advocate; son of Ian Ballantine '38 of Ballantine Books
- James Margolis (1958), Olympic fencer
- James Melcher (1961), Olympian fencer, president of Fencers Club and hedge fund manager
- Robert Contiguglia (1963), soccer player, former president of the United States Soccer Federation
- Peter Salzberg (1964), head coach of Vermont Catamounts men's basketball 1972–1981
- Archie Roberts (1965), former football player for the Miami Dolphins and cardiac surgeon
- Jim McMillian (1968), NBA player for the Los Angeles Lakers, Buffalo Braves, New York Knicks and Portland Trail Blazers
- Dave Newmark (1968), NBA player for the Chicago Bulls; also played for Israeli team Hapoel Tel Aviv B.C.
- Marty Domres (1969), football player for San Diego Chargers and Baltimore Colts
- Heyward Dotson (1970), basketball player
- George Starke (1971), offensive lineman for the Washington Redskins
- Henry Bunis (1975), two-time All-American tennis player, runner-up in 1977 Chilean Open
- Rick Fagel (1975), professional tennis player
- Vitas Gerulaitis* (1975), champion tennis player
- Thomas Losonczy (1975), Olympic fencer, winner of the Congressional Gold Medal
- Alton Byrd (1979), basketball player
- Eric Fromm (1980), tennis player
- John Witkowski (1983), football player for Detroit Lions and Houston Oilers
- Gene Larkin (1984), member of the Minnesota Twins 1987 and 1991 World Series championship teams
- Amr Aly (1985), soccer player who won the Hermann Trophy as the top college player of the year 1984; member of the 1984 U.S. Olympic Soccer Team and indoor soccer team Los Angeles Lazers
- Stephen Trevor (1986), Olympic fencer
- Kyra Tirana Barry (1987), team leader for U.S. women's national wrestling team
- Caitlin Bilodeaux (1987), Olympic fencer
- Howard Endelman (1987), tennis player
- Phil Williamson (1987), tennis player for Antigua and Barbuda
- Bob Cottingham (1988), Olympic fencer
- Jon Normile (1989), Olympic fencer
- Frank Seminara (1989), Major League Baseball pitcher for the San Diego Padres and the New York Mets
- Tom Auth (1990), Olympic rower
- Christine Vardaros (1991), professional cyclist
- Ann Marsh (1994), Olympic fencer
- Ríkharður Daðason (1996), Icelandic soccer player
- Marcellus Wiley (1997), football player for the Buffalo Bills, San Diego Chargers and Dallas Cowboys
- Dan Kellner (1998), fencer
- Pellegrino Matarazzo (1999), head coach of VfB Stuttgart
- Matt Napoleon (1999), Olympic soccer goalkeeper
- Cristina Teuscher (2000), Olympic gold medalist swimmer
- Jedediah Dupree (2001), NCAA Champion fencer
- Veljko Urošević (2003), Serbian Olympic rower
- Fernando Perez (2004), outfielder for the Tampa Bay Rays
- Jeremiah Boswell (2005), professional basketball player for BC Sliven, KK Strumica, and KK Torus
- Delilah DiCrescenzo (2005), long-distance runner, inspiration and subject of the Grammy-nominated song Hey There Delilah
- Michael Quarshie (2005), Finnish American football player who played for the Oakland Raiders and Frankfurt Galaxy
- Lisa Nemec (2006), Croatian long-distance runner
- Miloš Tomić (2006), Serbian Olympic rower
- Erison Hurtault (2007), Dominican sprinter
- James Leighman Williams (2007), fencer who won silver in the 2008 Summer Olympics
- Emily Jacobson (2008), fencer
- İhsan Emre Vural (2008), Turkish rower for Galatasaray S.K.
- Sherif Farrag (2009), Egyptian-American Olympic fencer
- Nicholas la Cava (2009), Olympic rower
- Jeff Spear (2010), Olympic fencer
- Daria Schneider (2010), fencer
- Jeff Adams (2011), Houston Texans offensive tackle
- Nicole Ross (2011), Olympic fencer
- Isadora Cerullo (2013), Brazilian-American Olympic rugby player
- Katie Meili (2013), Olympic swimmer, Pan American Games and 2016 Summer Olympics gold medalist
- Josh Martin (2013), Kansas City Chiefs linebacker
- John Gregorek Jr. (2014), middle-distance runner
- David Najem (2014), American soccer player for New Mexico United and the Afghanistan national football team
- Nadia Eke (2015), Ghanaian triple jumper, African Championships gold medalist in 2016
- Kristine Musademba (2015), figure skater
- Max Schnur (2015), tennis player playing on the ATP Challenger Tour
- Nzingha Prescod (2015), Olympic fencer
- Ramit Tandon (2015), professional squash player
- Jakub Buczek (2016), Canadian Olympic rower
- Sasha DiGiulian (2016), world champion climber
- Jacqueline Dubrovich (2016), Olympic fencer
- Maodo Lô (2016), German basketball player for Brose Bamberg
- Robb Paller (2016), American-Israeli Olympic baseball player
- Jeff Coby (2017), American basketball player for Xuventude Baloncesto
- Cameron Nizialek (2017), football player for Atlanta Falcons
- Akua Obeng-Akrofi (2018), Ghanaian sprinter
- Charlotte Buck (2018), Olympic rower
- Osama Khalifa (2018), #1 ranked college squash player in the U.S. for the 2016–17 season
- Camille Zimmerman (2018), American basketball player for Norrköping Dolphins
- Yasmeen Al-Dabbagh (2019), Saudi Arabian sprinter
- Jessica Antiles (2019), swimmer who won silver and bronze medals in the 2017 Maccabiah Games
- Dylan Castanheira (2019), soccer player, goalkeeper for Fort Lauderdale CF
- Sophie Whitehouse (2019), goalkeeper for Republic of Ireland women's national football team
- Mike Smith (2020), basketball player
- Anthony Jackie Tang (2020), Hong Kong tennis player
- John Tanguay (2020), rower who won a silver medal in the 2020 Summer Paralympics
- Dylan Geick* (2021), wrestler and internet personality
- Velavan Senthilkumar (2021), British Junior Open Squash champion and Asian Junior Squash champion
- Nastasya Generalova (2023), gymnast and model
- Olivia Giaccio (2024), Olympic freestyle skier
- Evita Griskenas (2024), rhythmic gymnast
- Camden Pulkinen (2024), figure skater
- Abbey Hsu (2024), basketball player

== Businesspeople ==
- Henry Rutgers (1766), Revolutionary War hero, businessman, philanthropist, and namesake of Rutgers University
- Leffert Lefferts (1794), first president of Long Island Bank
- William Bard (1798), son of physician Samuel Bard, founder and first president of New York Life Insurance Company
- Stephen Price (1799), theatrical manager who managed Park Theatre in Manhattan and Theatre Royal, Drury Lane in London
- William Backhouse Astor Sr.* (1811), son of John Jacob Astor
- Cornelius Roosevelt* (attended, year unknown), member of the Roosevelt family, one of the founders of the Chemical Bank; great-grandfather of Theodore Roosevelt
- James H. Roosevelt (1819), founder of Roosevelt Hospital
- Robert Goelet Sr. (1828), banker and real estate developer who was associated with the founding of the Chemical Bank
- Bradish Johnson (1831), industrialist involved in the Swill milk scandal
- Robert L. Cutting (1830), co-founder of the Continental Bank of New York and president of the New York Stock Exchange
- Henry T. Anthony (1832), photographer, vice-president of the E. & H. T. Anthony & Company
- Adrian G Iselin* (1837), financier, banker
- Edward Anthony (1838), photographer and founder of E. & H. T. Anthony & Company, largest manufacturer and distributor of photographic supplies in the U.S. during the 19th century
- John Jacob Astor III (1839), son of William Backhouse Astor Sr.
- William Henry Vanderbilt* (1841), eldest son of Cornelius Vanderbilt; president of the New York Central Railroad, Lake Shore and Michigan Southern Railway, Canada Southern Railway, and Michigan Central Railroad
- Robert Morrison Olyphant (1842), heir to trading company Olyphant & Co. and president of the Delaware and Hudson Railway
- Charles Carow* (1844), businessman son of shipping magnate Isaac Carow, father of first lady Edith Carow Roosevelt
- Frederic W. Rhinelander (1847), 3rd president of the Metropolitan Museum of Art
- William Backhouse Astor Jr. (1849), son of William Backhouse Astor Sr. and husband of Caroline Webster Schermerhorn Astor, co-founder of The Four Hundred list of socialites and Florida Yacht Club
- Robert L. Cutting Jr. (1856), banker and clubman, son of Robert L. Cutting '30
- George Lovett Kingsland (1856), merchant and railroad executive, son of New York City mayor Ambrose Kingsland
- Goold H. Redmond (1857), banker and sportsman
- Charles Henry Marshall (1858), businessman, former commissioner of Docks and Ferries of the City of New York, grandfather of publisher Marshall Field IV
- John Crosby Brown (1859), heir to investment bank Brown Bros. & Co., which later became Brown Brothers Harriman & Co., the oldest private bank in the U.S.
- Emory McClintock (1859), actuary; president of the American Mathematical Society and the Actuarial Society of America
- Robert Goelet (1860), real estate developer
- Rutherfurd Stuyvesant (1863), socialite, heir to the Stuyvesant family fortune
- J. Hooker Hamersley (1865), heir, lawyer, and poet; former president of the Knickerbocker Club
- Shipley Jones (1868), banker and clubman
- William Bayard Cutting (1869), financier, philanthropist, namesake of the Bayard Cutting Arboretum State Park
- Robert Fulton Cutting (1871), financier
- George Beach de Forest Jr. (1871), capitalist, bibliophile, and art collector
- Stuyvesant Fish (1871), president of the Illinois Central Railroad
- James Montaudevert Waterbury Sr. (1873), industrialist, co-founder of the New York Yacht Club
- Isaac Newton Seligman (1876), heir to investment bank J. & W. Seligman & Co.
- T. J. Oakley Rhinelander (1878), heir and real estate developer who owned the Schönburg castle in Germany
- William Fellowes Morgan Sr. (1880), businessman, philanthropist
- George Henry Warren II (1880), stockbroker and real estate developer who co-founded the Metropolitan Opera and Real Estate Company
- Eugene Higgins (1882), heir and philanthropist
- Lewis Morris Rutherfurd Jr. (1882), socialite and sportsman
- Marshall Orme Wilson (1882), banker and socialite, son-in-law of William Backhouse Astor Jr.
- George M. La Monte* (1884), chairman of Prudential Financial 1925–1927
- Joseph P. Knapp* (1884), businessman, philanthropist, founder of Ducks Unlimited
- Temple Bowdoin (1885), former executive of J.P. Morgan & Co.
- Benjamin Guggenheim* (1887), businessman, son of Meyer Guggenheim and member of the Guggenheim family
- Richard Thornton Wilson Jr. (1887), banker, prominent figure in Thoroughbred horse racing
- Richard Stevens (1890), attorney and real estate developer in Hoboken, New Jersey, grandson of inventor John Stevens and son of Stevens Institute of Technology founder Edwin Augustus Stevens
- Cortlandt F. Bishop (1891), aviator and book collector, grandson of philanthropist Benjamin Hazard Field
- Howard Gould* (1894), financier, son of railroad tycoon Jay Gould
- Joseph Peter Grace Sr. (1894), businessman, polo player, heir to W. R. Grace and Company; founder of Pan American-Grace Airways and Grace National Bank
- Samuel Bloomingdale (1895), businessman, heir to the Bloomingdale's department store fortune
- Dexter M. Ferry Jr. (1898), director of D.M. Ferry & Co.; member of the Michigan House of Representatives
- Charles A. Dana (1902), philanthropist who founded the Dana Foundation and Dana Holding Corporation
- John Knowles Fitch (1902), founder of Fitch Ratings, one of the Big Three rating agencies
- Marcellus Hartley Dodge Sr. (1903), chairman of the Remington Arms Company, husband of Geraldine Rockefeller Dodge
- George Earle Warren (1903), vice president of Chase Manhattan Bank
- Pendleton Dudley (1906), public relations executive, founder of Dudley-Anderson-Yutzy
- William Gage Brady Jr. (1908), chairman of Citigroup 1948–1952
- Edmond Guggenheim (1908), mining executive, grandson of Meyer Guggenheim
- Ward Melville (1909), founder of the Melville Corporation that owned CVS Health, Marshalls, and Thom McAn shoes; helped the establishment of Stony Brook University and Stony Brook Village Center
- John Vernou Bouvier III* (1914), stockbroker and socialite, father of Jacqueline Kennedy Onassis, transferred to Yale College after two years
- Armand G. Erpf (1917), senior partner at Loeb, Rhoades & Co., chairman of the Crowell-Collier Publishing Company, financial architect of the New York magazine
- Alan H. Kempner (1917), stockbroker and publishing executive, son-in-law of banker Carl M. Loeb
- Lindsley F. Kimball (1917), former president of United Service Organizations and National Urban League
- Charles Bierer Wrightsman (1918), oil executive and art collector
- Armand Hammer (1919), philanthropist, chairman of Occidental Petroleum, namesake of Hammer Museum and Armand Hammer United World College of the American West
- George E. Jonas (1919), partner at Pellessier-Jonas-Rivet Manufacturing Co., philanthropist and founder of Camp Rising Sun
- S. Marshall Kempner (1919), investment banker, and brother-in-law of Peggy Guggenheim
- John S. Sinclair (1920), fourth president of the Federal Reserve Bank of Philadelphia, former president of The Conference Board
- Charles M. Brinckerhoff (1922), former CEO and chairman of Anaconda Copper, world's largest producer of copper
- Morris Schapiro (1923), investment banker, grandfather of painter Jacob Collins '86 and brother of art historian Meyer Schapiro '24
- Lawrence Wien (1925), real estate magnate and philanthropist who owns the Empire State Building
- Francis Levien (1926), lawyer, director of Gulf and Western Industries, namesake of Levien Gymnasium
- Herbert Hutner (1928), private investment banker, attorney, and philanthropist; fourth husband of socialite Zsa Zsa Gabor
- Ivan Veit (1928), former executive vice president of The New York Times
- Nathan S. Ancell (1929), co-founder of furniture company Ethan Allen
- Ira D. Wallach (1929), head of Central National-Gottesman, the largest privately held marketer of paper and pulp products
- Benedict I. Lubell (1930), oilman, philanthropist
- Arthur Ross (1931), philanthropist, businessman; vice president of Central National-Gottesman; namesake of Arthur Ross Pinetum in Central Park
- Henry G. Walter Jr. (1931), businessman, former chairman and CEO of International Flavors & Fragrances and pioneer in aromatherapy
- Robert D. Lilley (1933), former president of AT&T 1972–1976 and the New Jersey Bell Telephone Company 1965–1970
- Macrae Sykes (1933), investment banker, former chairman of the American Stock Exchange
- Robert David Lion Gardiner (1934), banker, landowner, 16th Lord of the manor of Gardiners Island, direct descendant of 17th-century English settler Lion Gardiner
- Arnold A. Saltzman (1936), businessman, diplomat, art collector, philanthropist
- George J. Ames (1937), philanthropist, banker at Lazard Freres
- John Kluge (1937), billionaire, chairman and founder of Metromedia; America's richest person from 1989 to 1990; namesake of the John W. Kluge Center and Kluge Prize at the Library of Congress
- Vincent Sardi Jr.* (1937), restaurateur, owner of Sardi's, son of Vincent Sardi, Sr.
- Fred D. Thompson (1937), president and chief executive of Family Circle, vice president of The New York Times
- Grover Connell (1939), rice trader known for political campaign contributions
- Howard Pack (1939), chairman and president of Seatrain Lines
- Daniel Edelman (1940), founder of the world's largest public relations firm Edelman
- Elliott Sanger (1943), co-founder of classical radio channel WQXR-FM and advocate of FM broadcasting
- Wylie F. L. Tuttle (1944), real estate developer who spearheaded the construction of Tour Montparnasse
- Robert Rosencrans (1949), founding chairman of C-SPAN and president of UA-Columbia Cablevision
- Norton Garfinkle (1951), economist, businessman, public servant; chairman of the Future of American Democracy Foundation
- Mark N. Kaplan (1951), CEO of Drexel Burnham Lambert and Engelhard
- Harvey M. Krueger (1951), CEO of Kuhn, Loeb & Co. and vice chairman of Lehman Brothers
- Alan Wagner (1951), first president of Disney Channel
- Roone Arledge (1952), former president of ABC News and winner of 36 Emmys; creator of 20/20, Nightline, Monday Night Football, ABC World News Tonight and Primetime
- Alan N. Cohen (1952), former co-owner of the Boston Celtics and the Brooklyn Nets; former chairman and CEO of the Madison Square Garden Corporation
- Lawrence K. Grossman (1952), president of PBS 1976–1984 and NBC News 1985–1988
- Richard Wald (1952), former president of NBC News 1973–1977
- Robert A. Belfer (1955), oilman and philanthropist, namesake of the Belfer Center for Science and International Affairs at Harvard University
- Thomas Ludlow Chrystie II (1955), first chief financial officer of Merrill Lynch & Company and creator of the Cash Management Account
- Alfred Lerner (1955), chairman of MBNA Bank and ex-owner of the Cleveland Browns
- Richard Ravitch (1955), chairman of the Metropolitan Transportation Authority and the Bowery Savings Bank
- Sid Sheinberg (1955), head of Universal Pictures
- Barry F. Sullivan (1955), chairman and CEO of First Chicago Bank, deputy mayor of New York City under David Dinkins
- Edward Botwinick (1956), IT entrepreneur and inventor, co-founder of Timeplex
- Franklin A. Thomas (1956), former president of The Ford Foundation
- James R. Barker (1957), chairman of Interlake Steamship Company, former chairman and CEO of Moore-McCormack
- Peter L. Buttenwieser (1958), educator, Democratic Party fundraiser, member of the Lehman family
- Allen Rosenshine (1959), founder of the Omnicom Group, chairman and CEO of BBDO
- Doug Morris (1960), CEO of Sony Music Entertainment and former CEO of Universal Music Group
- Bernard Selz (1960), fund manager, philanthropist and anti-vaccination supporter
- Frank Lorenzo (1961), former chairman of Eastern Airlines, Texas Air Corporation and Texas International Airlines
- Douglas H. McCorkindale (1961), former chairman and CEO of Gannett
- William Campbell (1962), chairman of the board of Intuit, former board director of Apple Inc.; founder of Claris
- Sanford Greenberg (1962), investor, author and philanthropist
- Kenneth Lipper (1962), financier and deputy mayor of New York City; Academy Award-winning producer of The Holocaust documentary The Last Days
- Jerry Speyer (1962), billionaire, founding partner, chairman and CEO of Tishman Speyer and chairman of the Museum of Modern Art
- Robert Kraft (1963), chairman and CEO of The Kraft Group; owner of the New England Patriots
- Mark H. Willes (1963), former president of the Federal Reserve Bank of Minneapolis, CEO and Publisher of Los Angeles Times and Deseret Management Corporation
- Harry Saal (1963), co-founder of Network General Corporation, developer of the Sniffer
- Steven Clifford (1964), former CEO of King Broadcasting Company and National Mobile Television
- Arthur Cutler (1965), restaurateur, founder of Carmine's, Ollie's, and owner of Murray's Sturgeon Shop
- Ed Goodgold (1965), music industry executive and former manager of Sha Na Na, coined the term "trivia"
- Michael Gould (1966), former CEO of Bloomingdale's
- Julian Geiger (1967), former CEO of Aéropostale and current CEO of Crumbs Bake Shop
- Richard Sackler (1967), billionaire chairman and president of Purdue Pharma known for the development of Oxycontin
- Denny Greene (1971), former executive at Columbia Pictures, professor at University of Dayton School of Law, and member of Sha Na Na
- Mark E. Kingdon (1971), hedge fund manager, president of Kingdon Capital Management
- Philip L. Milstein (1971), former chairman and CEO of Emigrant Savings Bank, son of billionaire real estate developer Seymour Milstein
- Christopher M. Jeffries (1972), real estate developer, former husband of Princess Yasmin Aga Khan
- Marc Porat (1972), entrepreneur in information technology and sustainable materials; co-founder of General Magic
- John R. Eckel Jr. (1973), founder, CEO and chairman of Copano Energy
- Finbarr O'Neill (1973), former CEO of J.D. Power
- Fred Seibert (1973), TV producer and first creative director of MTV
- Robert B. Simon (1973), art dealer and historian who discovered Da Vinci's Salvator Mundi
- Albie Hecht (1974), founder of Spike TV, head of HLN, and former president of Nickelodeon; creator of Nickelodeon Kids' Choice Awards; Academy Award-nominated producer
- Alan Goodman (1974), MTV founding executive and Nickelodeon executive
- Gara LaMarche (1976), former president and CEO of The Atlantic Philanthropies; president of advocacy group Democracy Alliance
- J. Ezra Merkin (1976), financier, hedge fund manager; former chairman of GMAC Inc.
- John Slosar (1978), chairman of Swire Pacific and Cathay Pacific airlines
- Daniel E. Straus (1978), founder of CareOne LLC and former vice chairman of Memphis Grizzlies
- Jeph Loeb (1979), television writer and EVP of Marvel Television, four-time Eisner Award winner
- Sami Mnaymneh (1981), billionaire, private equity executive, co-founder of H.I.G. Capital
- Charles Murphy (1981), hedge fund manager, executive of Fairfield Greenwich Group
- Tom Glocer (1981), former CEO of Thomson Reuters and Reuters
- Christopher Radko (1981), businessman and designer, founder of the eponymous Christmas ornaments company
- Donald F. Ferguson (1982), chief technology officer at Dell and professor of Professional Practice in Computer Science at Columbia University
- Wayne Allyn Root (1983), business mogul, TV personality and producer, author, 2008 Libertarian Party vice-presidential nominee
- Daniel S. Loeb (1983), billionaire, hedge fund manager, founder of Third Point Management
- Kai-Fu Lee (1983), Taiwanese IT Venture Capitalist, founder of Google China and Microsoft Research Asia
- Steve Perlman (1983), founder and CEO of Artemis Networks; inventor of QuickTime, MSN TV, pCell, and Mova Contour facial motion capture technology
- Jonathan Abbott (1984), president and CEO of WGBH Educational Foundation
- Randy Lerner (1984), billionaire, ex-owner of Cleveland Browns and Aston Villa F.C., son of billionaire Alfred Lerner '55
- James Satloff (1984), founder of Liberty Skis and former president and CEO of C.E. Unterberg, Towbin
- Mehmet Omer Koç (1985), Turkish billionaire and member of the prominent Koç family of Turkey; son of billionaire Rahmi Koç and grandson of Vehbi Koç; chairman of Koç Holding, Turkey's largest conglomerate
- Nikolas Tsakos (1985), Greek shipping magnate, former chairman of the International Association of Independent Tanker Owners and husband of Greek fashion designer Celia Kritharioti
- Noam Gottesman (1986), billionaire, hedge fund manager, and co-founder of GLG Partners
- Daniel Ninivaggi (1986), CEO of Lordstown Motors and chairman of Garrett Motion, former CEO of Federal-Mogul and CEO of Icahn Enterprises
- Alex Navab (1987), head of the Americas Private Equity Business of Kohlberg Kravis Roberts
- Ben Horowitz (1988), technology entrepreneur, co-founder of software company Opsware and venture capital firm Andreessen Horowitz, son of conservative writer David Horowitz '59
- Dirk Edward Ziff (1988), billionaire businessman, son of publishing magnate William Bernard Ziff Jr.
- Jonathan Lavine (1988), business executive, co-managing partner of Bain Capital and chief investment officer of Bain Capital Credit
- Anita Lo (1988), celebrity chef and restaurateur
- Danielle Maged (1989), Fox Networks Group executive
- Joanne Ooi (1989), former creative director of Shanghai Tang; CEO of Clean Air Network and Plukka
- Paul Greenberg (1990), former CEO of CollegeHumor and current CEO of Nylon
- Prem Parameswaran (1990), CFO of Eros International Plc and member of the President's Advisory Commission on Asian Americans and Pacific Islanders
- William von Mueffling (1990), hedge fund manager, president of Cantillon Capital Management
- Christoph Westphal (1990), biomedical entrepreneur, founder of Alnylam Pharmaceuticals, Acceleron Pharma, and OvaScience
- Marko Ahtisaari (1991), Finnish entrepreneur; founding CEO of Dopplr; son of Martti Ahtisaari, tenth President of Finland and Nobel Peace Prize laureate
- Claude Arpels (1991), investor, entrepreneur, grandson of Julien Arpels and heir to the Van Cleef & Arpels fortune
- Tewodros Ashenafi (1991), founder and CEO of Ethiopian company SouthWest Energy
- Jack Hidary (1991), financier and entrepreneur, co-founder of the Automotive X Prize and EarthWeb/Dice Inc.
- E. Javier Loya (1991), CEO of OTC Global Holdings and minority owner in Houston Texans
- Zia Chishti (1992), entrepreneur and founder of Afiniti and Align Technology
- Erik Feig (1992), Lionsgate co-president and former president of Summit Entertainment; producer of Step Up series, Escape Plan, Mr. & Mrs. Smith
- Eugene Kashper (1992), owner of Pabst Brewing Company
- Rob Speyer (1992), president of Tishman Speyer, son of billionaire Jerry Speyer '62
- Thad Sheely (1993), former COO of Atlanta Hawks
- Shawn Landres (1994), social entrepreneur, co-founder of Jewish philanthropic organization Jumpstart
- Welly Yang (1994), real estate developer; former actor and playwright
- Ann Kim (1995), James Beard Foundation Award-winning restaurateur in Minneapolis
- Matt Pincus (1995), founder of Songs Music Publishing, son of Warburg Pincus co-founder Lionel Pincus
- Arnold Kim (1996), founder of MacRumors
- Daniel M. Ziff (1996), third youngest billionaire hedge fund manager in the U.S., son of publishing magnate William Bernard Ziff Jr.
- Li Lu (1996), former student leader of the Tiananmen Square protests of 1989, investment banker, founder of Himalaya Capital
- Michelle Patron (1996), director of sustainability at Microsoft
- Scott Sartiano (1997), restaurateur
- Roo Rogers (1998), entrepreneur, business designer, writer, son of British architect Richard Rogers
- Amol Sarva (1998), founder of Knotel, Peek, and Virgin Mobile USA
- Amanda Steinberg (1999), wealth advisor and founder of DailyWorth
- Shazi Visram (1999), founder of Happy Family
- Peter Kujawski (2000), chairman of Focus Features
- Robert Reffkin (2000), co-founder and CEO of Compass, Inc.
- Zvi Mowshowitz (2001), founder of MetaMed and former Magic: The Gathering world champion
- Daryl Ng (2001), executive director of Sino Group, son of Singaporean real estate billionaire Robert Ng
- Courtney Reum (2001), investor who founded VeeV spirits
- Adriana Cisneros (2002), vice chairman and CEO of Grupo Cisneros; daughter of Venezuelan media mogul Gustavo Cisneros
- Ellen Gustafson (2002), businesswoman, social entrepreneur, food activist, co-founder of FEED Projects and former spokesperson for the World Food Programme
- Peter Koechley (2003), co-founder of Upworthy and former managing editor of The Onion
- Aaron Bay-Schuck (2003), CEO and co-chairman of Warner Records, stepson of Star Trek actor Leonard Nimoy
- Carter Reum (2003), author and entrepreneur, founder of VEEV Spirits and known for his romance with socialite Paris Hilton
- Anna Fang (2004), Chinese investor, CEO of ZhenFund
- Jamie Hodari (2004), co-founder of Industrious
- Alicia Yoon (2004), founder of Peach and Lily, a Korean skincare store based in New York
- Doug Imbruce (2005), founder of Qwiki and Podz
- John Kluge Jr. (2005), philanthropist, investor, activist, son of John Kluge '37
- Alana Mayo (2006), president of Orion Pictures
- Liesel Pritzker Simmons (2006), former child actress, A Little Princess; granddaughter of businessman Abram Nicholas Pritzker, heiress to the Hyatt hotels fortune, philanthropist
- Wayne Ting (2006), CEO of Lime
- Marco Zappacosta (2007), co-founder and CEO of Thumbtack, son of Logitech founder Pierluigi Zappacosta
- Adam Pritzker (2008), co-founder of General Assembly, grandson of Jay Pritzker and member of the Pritzker family
- Jared Hecht (2009), co-founder of GroupMe
- Ariana Rockefeller (2009), fashion designer and great-great-granddaughter of John D. Rockefeller
- Zach Sims* (2012), co-founder of Codecademy
- Beverly Leon (2014), former midfielder of Sunderland A.F.C. Ladies, CEO of Local Civics
- Nicole LaPointe Jameson (2016), CEO of Evil Geniuses
- Korawad Chearavanont* (2017), Thai internet entrepreneur and grandson of Dhanin Chearavanont

== Journalism and media figures ==
=== Arts critics ===
- Gustav Kobbé (1877), opera scholar and music critic of the New York Herald
- Clifton Fadiman (1925), book critic for The New Yorker and judge for the Book of the Month Club
- Edward Downes (1933), music critic, former host on the Metropolitan Opera radio broadcasts, son of music critic Olin Downes
- Ralph J. Gleason (1938), music critic for the San Francisco Chronicle and co-founder of Rolling Stone
- Eugene Williams (1938), jazz critic, founder of Jazz Information
- Allan Temko (1947), architecture critic of the San Francisco Chronicle and winner of the Pulitzer Prize for Criticism
- Andrew Sarris (1951), film critic
- Martin Gottfried (1955), critic, author, and biographer
- Donald Kuspit (1955), art critic
- Morris Dickstein (1961), cultural critic and professor at The Graduate Center, CUNY
- David Denby (1965), film critic for The New Yorker
- Michael Feingold (1966), lead theater critic for The Village Voice
- Martin Filler (1970), architecture critic
- Gerrit Henry (1972), art critic, author, poet
- Jed Perl (1972), art critic; son of Nobel laureate Martin Lewis Perl GSAS '55
- Lucy Sante (1976), literary critic
- Tim Page (1979), music critic of The Washington Post and winner of the Pulitzer Prize for Criticism
- Jonathan Beller (1985), cultural critic, professor at Pratt Institute
- Michael Riedel (1989), theater critic for New York Post
- Ben Ratliff (1990), journalist and music critic
- Neil Strauss (1991), music critic and best-selling author
- Justin Shubow (1999), architectural critic, former chairman and member of the United States Commission of Fine Arts
- Helena Andrews (2002), pop culture critic

=== Broadcasters ===
- Robert Siegel (1968), host of All Things Considered on National Public Radio
- Jim Gardner (1970), anchor for WPVI-TV news in Philadelphia
- Christopher Kimball (1973), celebrity chef, editor-in-chief of Cook's Illustrated and host of America's Test Kitchen
- George Whipple III (1977), lawyer and society correspondent for NY1
- Pimm Fox (1982), Bloomberg Radio and Bloomberg Television anchorman
- Fred Katayama (1982), anchor on Reuters Television
- James Rubin (1982), Sky News anchorman; former assistant secretary of state for public affairs in the Clinton Administration; spokesman for the presidential campaigns of Wesley Clark and John Kerry; husband of Christiane Amanpour
- George Stephanopoulos (1982), ABC News personality; senior advisor to U.S. President Bill Clinton's administration
- Greg Burke (1982), former Fox News correspondent and director the Holy See Press Office
- Claire Shipman (1986), ABC News correspondent
- Elizabeth Cohen (1987), CNN's senior medical correspondent
- Alexandra Wallace (1988), executive producer of NBC Nightly News
- Soterios Johnson (1990), host of Morning Edition on National Public Radio
- Alexis Glick (1994), anchorwoman for the Fox Business Network
- Suzy Shuster (1994), Emmy Award-winning sportscaster with ABC Sports
- Max Kellerman (1998), boxing commentator and host of HBO World Championship Boxing
- Gideon Yago (2000), MTV News correspondent
- Jonathan Lemire (2001), journalist and host of MSNBC's Way Too Early
- Charlotte MacInnis (2002), China Central Television anchor known by the stage name Ai Hua; host of Growing up with Chinese
- Buzzy Cohen (2007), Jeopardy! guest host and contestant, co-host of The Chase
- Meghan McCain (2007), former co-host of The View, blogger and daughter of Arizona senator John McCain

=== Editors ===
- Francis Pharcellus Church (1859), editorial writer for the New York Sun and author of Yes, Virginia, There is a Santa Claus
- Horatio Sheafe Krans (1894), author and editor
- Simeon Strunsky (1900), literary editor of the New York Evening Post and editorial writer for The New York Times
- Lester Markel (1914), edited "Review of the Week", a section of The New York Times, which won the Special Awards and Citations Pulitzer Prize in 1953
- Daniel Longwell (1922), co-founder and managing editor of Life
- Theodore M. Bernstein (1924), assistant managing editor of The New York Times
- Herbert Solow (1924), editor of Fortune
- Groff Conklin (1927), science fiction anthologist
- Emanuel Freedman (1931), foreign editor of The New York Times
- James Wechsler (1935), editorial page editor of the New York Post
- David Perlman (1939), former science editor of the San Francisco Chronicle
- Lester Bernstein (1940), former editor-in-chief of Newsweek
- Werner Wiskari (1941), international news editor of The New York Times
- Lucien Carr (1946), editor for United Press International
- Byron Dobell (1947), editor of American Heritage, Esquire; mentor to journalists Tom Wolfe, David Halberstam, and Mario Puzo
- Charles Peters (1949), founder and former editor-in-chief of The Washington Monthly
- Ashbel Green (1950), senior editor and vice president of Alfred A. Knopf
- Emile Capouya (1951), literary editor of The Nation 1969–1981
- Robert Gottlieb (1952), editor of The New Yorker and president of Alfred A. Knopf
- Lawrence Van Gelder (1953), editor of the Arts and Leisure weekly section of The New York Times
- Max Frankel (1952), Pulitzer Prize winning executive editor of The New York Times
- Richard Locke (1962), critic, essayist and first editor of new incarnation of Vanity Fair magazine
- Leslie Pockell (1962), editor for Grand Central Publishing
- Carey Winfrey (1963), editor-in-chief of Smithsonian magazine 2001–2011
- Clark Hoyt (1964), public editor of The New York Times
- Myron Magnet (1966), editor of City Journal 1994–2006, National Humanities Medal recipient
- Chilton Williamson (1969), editor of the Chronicles magazine for the Rockford Institute
- Richard Snow (1970), editor of American Heritage magazine
- Paul Spike (1970), first American editor of Punch
- Leon Wieseltier (1974), literary editor, The New Republic
- Scott McConnell (1975), founding editor of The American Conservative
- Dean Baquet (1978), Pulitzer Prize-winning executive editor of The New York Times
- John Glusman (1978), editor-in-chief of W. W. Norton & Company
- Marcus Brauchli (1983), former managing editor, The Wall Street Journal and executive editor of The Washington Post
- Michael Caruso (1983), former editor-in-chief of Smithsonian who coined the term "elevator pitch"
- Max Alexander (1987), senior editor of People
- Dave Kansas (1990), COO of American Public Media Group; former editor-in-chief of TheStreet.com
- Charles Ardai (1991), founder of Juno and Hard Case Crime
- Janice Min (1991), former editor of Us Weekly, co-president and chief creative officer of Guggenheim Partners, head of The Hollywood Reporter and Billboard
- Tim Griffin (1992), former editor-in-chief of Artforum, director and chief curator of The Kitchen
- Michael Schaffer (1995), editor of Washingtonian and former editor of Washington City Paper
- Franklin Foer (1996), editor, The New Republic
- Marco Roth (1996), co-founder and editor of n+1
- Christopher Bollen (1998), journalist, essayist, and former editor-in-chief of Interview Magazine
- Eli Sanders (1999), associate editor of The Stranger and winner of the Pulitzer Prize for Feature Writing in 2012
- Sam Dolnick (2002), assistant managing editor of The New York Times, member of the Ochs-Sulzberger family
- Yoni Appelbaum (2003), senior editor for politics, The Atlantic
- Matthew Continetti (2003), associate editor and writer, The Weekly Standard
- Will Welch (2003), editor-in-chief of GQ
- Bari Weiss (2007), editor at Tablet and The New York Times op-ed section
- Atossa Araxia Abrahamian (2008), journalist and senior editor of The Nation

=== Journalists ===
- William Henry Leggett (1837), botanist and journalist who founded the Torrey Botanical Bulletin
- Henry Demarest Lloyd (1867), muckraking journalist, "father of investigative journalism"
- Herbert Agar (1919), journalist and historian, winner of the Pulitzer Prize for History in 1934
- Matthew Josephson (1920), journalist credited with popularizing the term "Robber baron"
- Herbert Matthews (1922), foreign correspondent for The New York Times who first reported Fidel Castro alive in the Sierra Maestra
- David Cort (1924), foreign news editor at Life magazine
- William Brown Meloney V (1926), journalist, son of noted journalist Marie Mattingly Meloney
- Ernest Cuneo (1927), president, North American Newspaper Alliance
- Harold Isaacs (1930), journalist and MIT professor who wrote extensively on the Chinese Civil War
- Peter C. Rhodes (1933), journalist who worked for United Press International and the United States Office of War Information
- Harry Schwartz (1940), editorial writer for The New York Times
- Phelan Beale Jr. (1944), journalist; first cousin of Jacqueline Kennedy Onassis
- Charles E. Silberman (1945), author and journalist
- Kennett Love (1948), journalist for The New York Times
- David Wise (1951), author of espionage and national security nonfiction
- Daniel S. Greenberg (1953), science journalist, brother of Jack Greenberg '45
- Barry Schweid (1953), Associated Press correspondent
- Walter Karp (1955), journalist, historian, contributing editor to Harper's Magazine
- Warren Boroson (1957), journalist; editor of Fact Magazine
- William E. Burrows (1960), author and journalist; founder of the Alliance to Rescue Civilization
- Thomas Lippman (1961), journalist and author specializing in the Middle East, correspondent for The Washington Post
- Lars-Erik Nelson (1962), New York Daily News columnist
- Allen Young (1962), journalist, author, political activist
- Bernard L. Stein (1963), journalist and winner of the Pulitzer Prize for Editorial Writing in 1998
- Michael Drosnin (1966), journalist and author on the Bible code
- Juan Gonzalez (1969), New York Daily News columnist
- Jeffrey Bruce Klein (1969), investigative journalist and co-founder of Mother Jones
- James Simon Kunen (1970), author of articles for Newsday, People, The New York Times Magazine and the novel The Strawberry Statement
- Glenn Frankel (1971), journalist for The Washington Post, winner of the 1989 Pulitzer Prize for International Reporting
- Juris Kaža (1971), journalist for Latvian News Agency LETA
- Jonathan Freedman (1972), journalist and winner of the 1987 Pulitzer Prize for Editorial Writing
- John Brecher (1973), journalist and wine critic for The Wall Street Journal
- Michael Wolff (1975), media columnist for New York Magazine and Vanity Fair, author of controversial book Fire and Fury on Donald Trump
- Bill Minutaglio (1976), journalist, biographer of George W. Bush
- D. D. Guttenplan (1978), London correspondent and current editor of The Nation
- Michael Musto (1978), gossip columnist for The Village Voice
- Andrea di Robilant (1979), Italian journalist for La Stampa and professore
- Tim Weiner (1979), Pulitzer Prize-winning reporter for The New York Times specializing in national security matters
- Kevin Baker (1980), freelance journalist and novelist
- John Leland (1981), journalist for The New York Times
- Jason Zweig (1982), financial journalist and columnist for The Wall Street Journal
- Barry C. Lynn (1983), journalist, senior fellow at the New America Foundation
- Ashley Kahn (1983), Grammy-winning music historian, journalist, and producer
- Daniel Wattenberg (1983), journalist for The Washington Times, son of neoconservative pundit Ben J. Wattenberg
- N.J. Burkett (1984), award-winning correspondent for WABC-TV
- Matthew Cooper (1984), Time magazine White House correspondent and defendant in the Valerie Plame investigation
- Tom Watson (1984), journalist, entrepreneur
- Thomas Vinciguerra (1985), journalist, editor and author
- Naftali Bendavid (1986), Congress correspondent for The Wall Street Journal
- Susan Benesch (1986), journalist, free speech advocate
- Elizabeth Rubin (1987), journalist for The New York Times Magazine, sister of Bloomberg News executive editor James Rubin '82
- Aram Roston (1988), investigative journalist
- Edward Lewine (1989), author and freelance journalist
- Sam Marchiano (1989), television sportscaster, documentarian and activist, daughter of sportscaster Sal Marchiano
- David Streitfeld (1989), book reporter for The Washington Post; winner of the 2013 Pulitzer Prize for Explanatory Reporting
- Caroline Glick (1991), Israeli journalist, editor, writer
- Warren St. John (1991), journalist for The New York Times and former CEO of Patch
- Michael J. Socolow (1991), broadcast journalist and professor at the University of Maine
- Jesse Eisinger (1992), Pulitzer Prize-winning reporter for ProPublica
- Jean H. Lee (1992), former Associated Press bureau chief in Pyongyang and Seoul
- Jori Finkel (1992), art reporter for The New York Times and Los Angeles Times
- Olivier Knox (1992), chief Washington correspondent for SiriusXM and former president of the White House Correspondents' Association
- Jim Frederick (1993), author and journalist
- Russell Gold (1993), journalist for The Wall Street Journal and Pulitzer Prize-finalist
- Michael Rothfeld (1993), journalist for The Wall Street Journal and winner of the 2019 Pulitzer Prize for National Reporting
- Brad Stone (1993), journalist for Bloomberg Business
- Anne Kornblut (1994), correspondent for The Washington Post, winner of the 2014 Pulitzer Prize for Public Service
- Joshua Prager (1994), journalist and author who writes on historical secrets
- Jodi Kantor (1996), writer and former editor on culture and politics for The New York Times, winner of the 2018 Pulitzer Prize for Public Service
- Harriet Ryan (1996), journalist and winner of the 2019 Pulitzer Prize for Investigative Reporting
- Robin Shulman (1996), freelance journalist
- Kate Kelly (1997), journalist for The New York Times
- Nicholas Kulish (1997), Berlin bureau chief for The New York Times and novelist
- Patrick Radden Keefe (1999), writer and investigative journalist
- David Epstein (2002), investigative reporter at ProPublica and author of the New York Times bestseller The Sports Gene
- Nick Schifrin (2002), Al Jazeera America's Middle East correspondent
- Ben Casselman (2003), economics reporter at The New York Times
- Jonah Lehrer (2003), former writer for The New Yorker discharged for falsifying quotes
- Poppy Harlow (2005), correspondent for CNN
- Sarah Maslin Nir (2005), investigative journalist for The New York Times
- Marc Tracy (2007), journalist for The New York Times, recipient of a 2011 National Magazine Award and a 2012 National Jewish Book Award
- Linette Lopez (2008), journalist for Business Insider involved in the December 15, 2022 Twitter suspensions
- Nellie Bowles (2010), technology journalist for The New York Times
- Cecilia Reyes (2015), winner of the Pulitzer Prize for Investigative Reporting in 2022

=== Pundits ===
- Frank Chodorov (1907), conservative activist, founder of the Intercollegiate Studies Institute, editor of The Freeman
- Arnold Beichman (1934), conservative critic
- Ralph de Toledano (1938), conservative commentator, editor of National Review and Newsweek
- Joseph Kraft (1947), political columnist, speechwriter for John F. Kennedy
- Jules Witcover (1949), columnist, The Baltimore Sun
- Norman Podhoretz (1950), a "father of neoconservatism", editor of Commentary Magazine and author of Making It
- Jeffrey Hart (1952), conservative cultural critic and advisor to the Dartmouth Review
- David Horowitz (1959), conservative commentator and activist; author of the Academic Bill of Rights
- Herbert London (1960), conservative activist; former professor at New York University and first dean of the Gallatin School of Individualized Study; former president of conservative think tank Hudson Institute
- D. Keith Mano (1963), conservative political commentator for National Review
- Lawrence Auster (1971), Traditionalist conservative blogger and essayist
- Andrew Levy (1988), conservative commentator and host of Red Eye on Fox News

=== Sports journalists ===
- Jeremy Gaige (1951), chess archivist and journalist
- Paul Zimmerman (1955), football writer for Sports Illustrated known as "Dr. Z"
- Robert Lipsyte (1957), sports writer for The New York Times, correspondent for ABC News and host of The Eleventh Hour
- Chet Forte (1957), first director of Monday Night Football
- Steven Krasner (1975), sports journalist famous for covering the Boston Red Sox for The Providence Journal 1986–2008
- Bob Klapisch (1979), sports writer for The Record and Fox Sports
- Gary Cohen (1981), television play-by-play announcer for the New York Mets

== Legal and judicial figures ==
- Richard Harison (1764), first U.S. attorney for the District of New York
- Peter van Schaack (1767), loyalist and attorney
- Abraham Van Vechten (1780s), two-time New York attorney general
- Anthony Bleecker (1791), lawyer and founding member of the New-York Historical Society
- Samuel Jones Jr. (1793), recorder of New York City; chancellor of New York; chief justice of the New York City Superior Court
- Augustus B. Woodward (1793), first chief justice of the Michigan Territory; one of the founders of the University of Michigan
- Thomas Phoenix (1795), New York County district attorney
- Pierre C. Van Wyck (1795), New York County district attorney; recorder of New York City
- William P. Van Ness (1797), judge on the United States District Court for the Southern District of New York
- Sampson Simson (1800), attorney, philanthropist, remembered as the "father of Mount Sinai Hospital"
- Alexander Hamilton Jr. (1804), son of Alexander Hamilton, attorney, soldier, and member of the New York State Assembly
- Hugh Maxwell (1808), New York County district attorney and Collector of the Port of New York
- Matthew C. Paterson (1809), New York County district attorney
- Ogden Hoffman (1812), former New York State attorney general, U.S. attorney for the Southern District of New York, and U.S. congressman from New York
- Frederic de Peyster (1819), New York attorney
- Theodore Sedgwick III (1829), U.S. attorney for the Southern District of New York
- Samuel Blatchford (1837), associate justice of the U.S. Supreme Court, chief judge of the United States Court of Appeals for the Second Circuit, judge of the United States District Court for the Southern District of New York
- Ogden Hoffman Jr. (1840), judge on the United States District Court for the Northern District of California
- William Colford Schermerhorn (1840), lawyer, philanthropist, trustee of Columbia University
- Peter B. Sweeny* (1840s), New York County district attorney in 1858
- Alexander McCue (1845), solicitor of the United States Treasury 1885–1888
- Joseph Larocque (1849), attorney; president of the New York City Bar Association
- Frederic René Coudert Sr. (1850), lawyer, founder of international law firm Coudert Brothers
- Myer J. Newmark* (1850s), youngest city attorney in the history of Los Angeles
- Elbridge Thomas Gerry (1857), lawyer and social reformer who founded the New York Society for the Prevention of Cruelty to Children; grandson of U.S. Vice President Elbridge Gerry
- Gabriel Mead Tooker (1859), lawyer and clubman, father in law of Whitney Warren of architectural firm Warren and Wetmore
- Edgar M. Cullen (1860), chief judge of the New York Court of Appeals
- Egerton Leigh Winthrop (1860), lawyer and socialite
- Emile Henry Lacombe (1863), judge on the United States Court of Appeals for the Second Circuit
- Henry Rutgers Beekman (1865), judge on the New York Supreme Court, former corporation counsel of New York City and parks commissioner
- George Goelet Kip (1865), lawyer, heir and member of the Goelet family
- George Gosman DeWitt (1867), lawyer, philanthropist, former president of the Saint Nicholas Society of the City of New York
- Nicholas Fish II (1867), attorney, diplomat, investment banker; son of United States Secretary of State Hamilton Fish
- Willard Bartlett (1869), chief judge of the New York Court of Appeals
- Lewis Cass Ledyard* (1871), personal counsel to J. P. Morgan and namesake partner of Carter Ledyard & Milburn, transferred to Harvard University after freshman year
- Frederic Bronson (1871), lawyer and treasurer for New York Life and Trust Company, grandson of American Revolutionary War surgeon Isaac Bronson
- Thomas C. Bach (1875), judge on the Supreme Court of the Territory of Montana
- Francis S. Bangs (1878), attorney at Bangs, Stetson, Tracy, and McVeigh and trustee of Columbia College
- Frederick William Holls (1878), lawyer, publicist, secretary of the United States delegation to the Hague Peace Conference
- Edward De Peyster Livingston (1882), lawyer and society leader during the Gilded Age
- Randolph B. Martine (1885), New York County district attorney 1885–1887
- John Vernou Bouvier Jr. (1886), lawyer and stockbroker, grandfather of Jacqueline Kennedy Onassis, Lee Radziwill and Edith Bouvier Beale
- Benjamin Cardozo (1889), associate justice of the U.S. Supreme Court
- William Bondy (1890), judge on the United States District Court for the Southern District of New York
- Irving Lehman (1896), chief judge of the New York Court of Appeals, son of Mayer Lehman and member of the Lehman family
- Joseph M. Proskauer (1896), lawyer, judge, co-founder of international law firm Proskauer Rose
- Frederic Kimber Seward (1899), corporate lawyer and Titanic survivor
- Arthur Garfield Hays (1902), counsel for the American Civil Liberties Union and lawyer in the Scopes Trial
- Benjamin Kaye (1904), lawyer, playwright, co-founder of international law firm Kaye Scholer
- George Z. Medalie (1905), United States Attorney for the Southern District of New York 1931–1933; Republican nominee for the United States Senate in New York in 1932
- Irwin Untermyer (1907), jurist, civic leader, son of Samuel Untermyer
- Alexander Holtzoff (1908), judge on the United States District Court for the District of Columbia
- Paul Windels (1908), former Corporation Counsel of New York City and co-founder of the Lycée Français de New York
- Emil N. Baar (1913), New York Supreme Court justice and former chairman of the Union of American Hebrew Congregations
- Albert Levitt (1913), judge on the District Court of the Virgin Islands
- Peter I. B. Lavan (1915), lawyer and philanthropist and namesake of Stroock & Stroock & Lavan
- Raymond L. Wise (1916), attorney and director of the American Civil Liberties Union
- Horace Manges (1917), attorney, name partner of Weil, Gotshal & Manges
- Benjamin Buttenwieser (1919), partner of Kuhn, Loeb, president of the United Jewish Appeal, grandson-in-law of Mayer Lehman and Adolph Lewisohn
- Alfred Egidio Modarelli (1920), judge on the United States District Court for the District of New Jersey
- George Rosling (1920), judge on the United States District Court for the Eastern District of New York
- Archie Owen Dawson (1921), judge of the United States District Court for the Southern District of New York
- Louis Nizer (1922), legendary trial lawyer who wrote My Life in Court
- Joseph Carmine Zavatt (1922), judge of the United States District Court for the Eastern District of New York
- Alan J. Altheimer (1923), lawyer and managing partner of Altheimer & Gray
- Milton Handler (1923), antitrust expert and Columbia Law School professor
- John T. Cahill (1924), U.S. attorney for the Southern District of New York and founding partner of Cahill Gordon & Reindel
- Paul R. Hays (1924), judge of the United States Court of Appeals for the Second Circuit; wrote majority opinion that found I Am Curious (Yellow) to be not obscene
- Frank Hogan (1924), district attorney of New York City
- George Jaffin (1924), attorney and philanthropist; major patron of Yaacov Agam
- Morton Baum (1925), lawyer and arts patron, former chairman of New York City Center
- Frederick van Pelt Bryan (1925), judge on the United States District Court for the Southern District of New York
- Abraham Feller (1925), general counsel to the Secretary-General of the United Nations Trygve Lie, close friend of Alger Hiss
- Jerome L. Greene (1926), lawyer, philanthropist
- Murray Gurfein (1926), judge on the United States District Court for the Southern District of New York, famous for presiding over the Pentagon Papers case
- Herbert M. Singer (1926), lawyer, philanthropist, former director of PepsiCo and president of Beth Israel Medical Center
- Edmund Louis Palmieri (1926), judge on the United States District Court for the Southern District of New York
- Milton Pollack (1927), judge of the United States District Court for the Southern District of New York
- Samuel Silverman (1928), justice on the New York Supreme Court; partner at Paul, Weiss, Rifkind, Wharton & Garrison who represented J. Robert Oppenheimer and Otto Frank, father of Anne Frank
- Arthur Krim (1930), partner at Phillips Nizer Benjamin Krim & Ballon; co-chairman of United Artists
- Gerald Dickler (1931), lawyer, chairman of the Pollock-Krasner Foundation and founding member of Capital Cities/ABC Inc.
- Charles Miller Metzner (1931), judge on the United States District Court for the Southern District of New York and the Temporary Emergency Court of Appeals
- Lawrence E. Walsh (1932), independent counsel in the Iran-Contra affair; 4th United States Deputy Attorney General
- William Golub (1934), lawyer and advisor to Governor Nelson Rockefeller
- Harold Leventhal (1934), judge on the United States Court of Appeals for the District of Columbia Circuit
- John Slate (1935), lawyer and name partner of Skadden Arps Slate Meagher & Flom
- Daniel Mortimer Friedman (1937), judge of the United States Court of Appeals for the Federal Circuit, last chief judge of the United States Court of Claims, and acting solicitor general of the United States
- Wilfred Feinberg (1940), judge of the United States Court of Appeals for the Second Circuit
- Hugh H. Bownes (1941), judge of the United States Court of Appeals for the First Circuit
- Richard Kuh (1941), New York County district attorney and prosecutor of Lenny Bruce for obscenity
- Leonard I. Garth (1942), senior judge on the United States Court of Appeals for the Third Circuit
- Charles L. Brieant (1944), judge of the United States District Court for the Southern District of New York
- Jack Greenberg (1945), civil rights lawyer who argued the Brown v. Board of Education case before the United States Supreme Court
- Roy Cohn (1946), attorney and counsel to Sen. Joseph McCarthy
- Arthur Lazarus Jr. (1947), American Indian rights lawyer, argued United States v. Sioux Nation of Indians and was involved in the Black Hills Land Claim
- John Lowenthal (1947), lawyer and documentary filmmaker known for his defense of Alger Hiss
- Norman Dorsen (1950), professor at the New York University School of Law and former president of the American Civil Liberties Union
- Robert O. Harris (1951), labor lawyer and chairman of the National Mediation Board
- Norman Marcus (1953), New York City Planning Commission general counsel and zoning expert
- Richard H. Stern (1953), attorney and law professor
- David Braun (1954), music industry lawyer, former president of PolyGram Records
- Alvin Hellerstein (1954), US federal judge
- Isaac Shapiro (1954), head of international practice at Skadden, Arps, Slate, Meagher & Flom, former president of Japan Society
- Clarence Benjamin Jones (1956), attorney and advisor to Martin Luther King Jr.
- Jerome H. Kern (1957), founder of Wachtell, Lipton, Rosen & Katz, former CEO of Playboy and Colorado Symphony
- Bernard Nussbaum (1958), White House counsel under Bill Clinton
- Ezra G. Levin (1959), lawyer, co-chair of international law firm Kramer Levin Naftalis & Frankel
- David G. Trager (1959), judge on the United States District Court for the Eastern District of New York
- Robert Abrams (1960), Bronx borough president and New York state attorney general
- Frank Tuerkheimer (1960), Watergate prosecutor and former U.S. attorney for the Western District of Wisconsin
- José A. Cabranes (1961), judge of the U.S. Court of Appeals; first Puerto Rican to sit in a U.S. District Court; current trustee of Columbia University
- Michael B. Mukasey (1963), attorney general of the United States; former chief judge of the United States District Court for the Southern District of New York
- David Saxe (1963), associate justice of the Appellate Division of the New York Supreme Court, First Judicial Department and former judge on the New York Supreme Court
- Peter Zimroth (1963), assistant U.S. attorney for the Southern District of New York and assistant New York County district attorney, professor at the New York University School of Law
- Barry Kamins (1965), New York City Criminal Court judge and professor at the Fordham University School of Law and Brooklyn Law School
- Howard Matz (1965), senior judge of the United States District Court for the Central District of California
- Flemming L. Norcott Jr. (1965), former associate justice of the Connecticut Supreme Court
- Joel Klein (1967), assistant attorney general of the United States; chancellor of the New York City Department of Education
- Anthony C. Moscato (1967), acting inspector general of the Department of Justice and director of the Executive Office for United States Attorneys
- David M. Becker (1968), two-time general counsel of the U.S. Securities and Exchange Commission
- Nicholas G. Garaufis (1969), judge of the United States District Court for the Eastern District of New York and former chief counsel of the Federal Aviation Administration
- Jonathan D. Schiller (1969), lawyer, co-founder of Boies Schiller Flexner LLP
- Eric Eisner (1970), lawyer, former president of The Geffen Company and founder of the Young Eisner Scholars program
- William Barr (1971), attorney general of the United States
- Arthur Engoron (1971), judge presiding over the New York civil investigation of The Trump Organization
- Arthur Helton (1971), lawyer, refugee advocate
- Gerard E. Lynch (1972), judge of the United States District Court for the Southern District of New York
- Gary Stephen Katzmann (1973), judge on the United States Court of International Trade
- Robert Katzmann (1973), judge of the United States Court of Appeals for the Second Circuit
- Eric Holder (1973), United States attorney general under Barack Obama, deputy attorney general under Bill Clinton, United States Attorney for the District of Columbia, judge of the Superior Court of the District of Columbia
- Jonathan Cuneo (1974), lawyer, founding partner of Cuneo Gilbert & LaDuca, LLP
- Abbe Lowell (1974), partner at Chadbourne & Parke, chief minority counsel during the Impeachment of Bill Clinton
- Jeffrey L. Kessler (1975), co-chairman of Winston & Strawn; former global litigation chair at Dewey & LeBoeuf
- Douglas Letter (1975), general counsel to the United States House of Representatives since 2018
- J. Richard Cohen (1976), former president of the Southern Poverty Law Center
- Joseph A. Greenaway Jr. (1978), federal judge of the United States District Court for the District of New Jersey
- Rolando Acosta (1979), associate justice of the Appellate Division of the New York Supreme Court, First Judicial Department
- Frank J. Aquila (1979), corporate lawyer, partner at Sullivan & Cromwell
- Umar Ata Bandial (1979), justice of the Supreme Court of Pakistan and former chief justice of Lahore High Court
- Lanny A. Breuer (1980), U.S. assistant attorney general for the Criminal Division
- Ronald Weich (1980), U.S. assistant attorney general for the Office of Legislative Affairs
- Paul Feinman (1981), judge of the New York Court of Appeals
- Michael H. Cohen (1983), healthcare law attorney, professor at Harvard Medical School
- Miguel Estrada (1983), controversial nominee to the United States Court of Appeals for the D.C. Circuit
- Steven Reich (1983), CEO of Deutsche Bank Trust Company and former associate deputy attorney general 2011–2013
- Gary R. Brown (1985), judge of the United States District Court for the Eastern District of New York
- John H. Chun (1991), judge and nominee to the United States District Court for the Western District of Washington
- Andrew Ceresney (1993), chair of litigation practice at Debevoise & Plimpton and former head of enforcement at the U.S. Securities and Exchange Commission
- Veronica S. Rossman (1993), judge on the United States Court of Appeals for the Tenth Circuit
- Nancy Abudu (1996), lawyer and nominee to the United States Court of Appeals for the Eleventh Circuit
- Nusrat Jahan Choudhury (1998), lawyer and nominee to the United States District Court for the Eastern District of New York
- Roy Altman (2004), judge of the United States District Court for the Southern District of Florida
- Raph Graybill (2010), attorney, chief legal counsel to Steve Bullock and Democratic candidate in the 2020 Montana Attorney General election
- Shana Knizhnik (2010), lawyer and author known for her book Notorious R.B.G.: The Life and Times of Ruth Bader Ginsburg

== Military leaders ==
- Rudolphus Ritzema (1758), officer during the American Revolutionary War
- Edward Antill (1762), colonel and military engineer of the Continental Army who fought in the Battle of Quebec
- Nicholas Fish (177-), American Revolutionary War officer
- John Doughty (1770), served as commanding general of the United States Army in 1784
- Stephen Lush (1770), American Revolutionary War officer
- Robert Troup (1774), soldier, lawyer, jurist, roommate of Alexander Hamilton at King's College
- Samuel Auchmuty (1775), British general, commander-in-chief, Ireland and commander of the Madras Army
- Marinus Willett (1776), colonel of the Continental Army, leader of the Sons of Liberty and 48th mayor of New York City
- John Chrystie (1806), colonel of the United States Army during the War of 1812
- Stephen Kearny* (1812), conqueror of California in the Mexican–American War
- Charles Wilkes (1818), leader of the United States Exploring Expedition to survey the Pacific Ocean; instigator of the Trent Affair during the American Civil War
- Philip Kearny (1833), United States Army officer
- Henry M. Judah* (1840), United States Army officer during the Mexican–American War and the American Civil War
- John Watts de Peyster* (1840), Civil War general, military critic and historian
- Edward E. Potter (1842), officer during the American Civil War
- Augustus van Horne Ellis* (1844), Civil War general
- William Cutting* (1851), lawyer and soldier
- Henry Eugene Davies (1857), Civil War general
- William McNeill Whistler* (1857), Confederate soldier and surgeon, brother of James Abbott McNeill Whistler
- Alfred Thayer Mahan* (1858), president, U.S. Naval War College and author of The Influence of Sea Power Upon History
- William Jay (1859), soldier and lawyer, 40th president of the Saint Nicholas Society of the City of New York and great-grandson of first U.S. chief justice John Jay
- Alister Greene (1875), soldier and leader during the Gilded Age
- Duncan Elliot (1884), soldier and banker
- Hamilton Fish II (1895), first American killed in the Spanish–American War
- Ulysses S. Grant III* (1902), grandson of Ulysses S. Grant, entered with the class of 1902 but transferred to United States Military Academy
- Donald Armstrong (1909), brigadier general and commandant of the Army Industrial College
- John H. Hilldring* (1916), U.S. major general and former assistant secretary of state for occupied areas
- Melvin Krulewitch (1916), U.S. major general and president of the New York State Athletic Commission
- John F. "Jack" Hasey* (1940), American captain in the French Foreign Legion; recipient of the Order of Liberation

== Musicians, composers, and lyricists ==
- Burnet Tuthill (1909), musicologist, conductor, founder and secretary of the National Association of Schools of Music
- Roy Webb (1910), composer for Notorious and Abe Lincoln in Illinois
- Richard Hale (1914), opera and concert singer; narrator, Peter and the Wolf
- Oscar Hammerstein II (1916), lyricist for Show Boat, Oklahoma! and The King and I, among other Broadway musical hits
- Howard Dietz (1917), director of publicity for MGM and lyricist for "Dancing in the Dark"
- Lorenz Hart (1918), lyricist for Pal Joey and other Broadway musical hits
- Richard Rodgers* (1923), composer and collaborator with Lorenz Hart and Oscar Hammerstein II; wrote music for Carousel, The Sound of Music, and Victory at Sea, among many others; one of the only two people to have won an Emmy, a Grammy, an Oscar, a Tony Award, and a Pulitzer Prize
- Elie Siegmeister (1927), composer, music teacher, writer on music
- Richard Franko Goldman (1930), composer, music professor, president of the Peabody Institute 1969–1977
- Milton Katims (1930), conductor, music director of the Seattle Symphony 1954–1976
- Mordecai Bauman (1935), baritone
- Emerson Buckley (1936), conductor, The Crucible, The Ballad of Baby Doe; director of the Florida Grand Opera 1950–1973
- Eddie Sauter (1936), jazz musician
- Elliott Schwartz (1936), composer and professor emeritus of Bowdoin College
- John La Touche* (1937), lyricist for Cabin in the Sky and The Golden Apple
- Howard Shanet (1939), conductor and composer, former head of Columbia University's music department
- Leonard B. Meyer (1940), composer, author, philosopher known for his contributions to the aesthetic theory of music
- Orrin Keepnews (1943), jazz record producer and winner of the 1988 Grammy Award for Best Album Notes and Best Historical Album
- Mort Lindsey (1944), musical director for Judy Garland and Merv Griffin
- Dick Hyman (1948), musical director for Arthur Godfrey; composer or arranger for Hannah and Her Sisters and The Purple Rose of Cairo; Emmy Award winner
- Philip Springer (1950), composer known for writing the song "Santa Baby"
- Randy Starr (1951), dentist and composer for Elvis Presley
- Eric Salzman (1954), composer, producer, critic; founder of the American Music Theater Festival and composer-in-residence of the Center for Contemporary Opera
- Malcolm Frager (1955), piano virtuoso
- Mike Berniker (1957), musical producer and winner of nine Grammy Awards
- Billy Goldenberg (1957), composer and winner of four Emmy Awards
- John Corigliano (1959), winner of the Pulitzer Prize for Music and Academy Award for Best Original Score
- Edward Kleban (1959), lyricist for A Chorus Line
- David Bromberg* (1960s), Grammy Award-nominated musician
- Art Rosenbaum (1960), Grammy Award-winning art professor and musician at Georgia State University
- Charles Wuorinen (1961), serialist composer and winner of the Pulitzer Prize for Music for Time's Encomium
- Charlie Morrow (1962), sound artist and musician
- Joel Krosnick (1963), chamber musician and member of the Juilliard String Quartet
- David Rubinson (1963), record and music producer of Apocalypse Now, founder of San Francisco Records and The Automatt recording studio
- Art Garfunkel (1965), singer of Simon and Garfunkel, famous for the song "The Sound of Silence"
- Daniel Waitzman (1965), flutist and composer
- Kenneth Ascher (1966), Academy Award-nominated jazz pianist; writer of "Rainbow Connection" from The Muppet Movie
- David Schiff (1967), composer
- Tom Werman (1967), former record producer for Epic Records
- Billy Cross (1968), guitarist, singer, and producer who lives in Denmark
- Jon Bauman (1969), "Bowzer" of Sha Na Na
- James "Plunky" Branch (1969), jazz musician
- Cameron Brown (1969), jazz bassist
- Emanuel Ax (1970), concert pianist
- Marc Copland (1970), jazz pianist and composer
- Scott Simon (1970), member of Sha Na Na
- Frederick "Dennis" Greene (1971), member of Sha Na Na; professor of law at the University of Dayton
- Armen Donelian (1972), jazz pianist
- Jocko Marcellino (1972), member of Sha Na Na
- Phil Schaap (1973), Charlie Parker authority and multiple Grammy Award winner for engineering, production, and album notes
- Eugene Drucker (1973), Grammy Award-winning violinist, member of the Emerson String Quartet
- Sam Morrison (1973), saxophonist
- Michael Jeffrey Shapiro (1973), composer and conductor
- Richard Einhorn (1975), composer, Voices of Light
- Phil Kline (1975), composer
- Paul Phillips (1978), conductor, composer, and music scholar at Brown University
- Erik Friedlander (1982), cellist, son of American photographer Lee Friedlander
- Robbie Fulks* (1984), Grammy Award-nominated American alternative country singer-songwriter
- Dave Nachmanoff (1986), award-winning folk singer and sideman to Al Stewart
- John Bohlinger (1988), musician and music director on NBC program Nashville Star
- Laura Cantrell (1989), country musician
- Peter J. Nash (1989), member of 3rd Bass
- Mac McCaughan (1990), member of indie rockband Superchunk and founder of Merge Records
- Richard Carrick (1993), pianist, composer, professor at Berklee College of Music
- Gil Shaham (1993), violinist
- Jefferson Friedman (1996), composer
- Tom Kitt (1996), composer, co-winner of the 2010 Pulitzer Prize for Drama and the Tony Award for Best Original Score for his score of the musical Next to Normal
- R. Luke DuBois (1997), composer and artist
- Lauryn Hill* (1997), Grammy Award-winning R&B singer and songwriter, and member of The Fugees
- Sean Lennon* (1997), singer and songwriter, and son of John Lennon and Yoko Ono
- Orli Shaham (1997), pianist
- Yelena Dudochkin (1998), Ukrainian-American soprano
- Scott Hoffman (1999), known by the stage name Babydaddy, member of the rock band Scissor Sisters
- The Two Man Gentlemen Band, modern musical duo that consists of Fuller Condon (2000) and Andy Bean (2001)
- Mason Bates (2000), Grammy Award-winning composer
- Tom Frank (2000), journalist, former member of indie-rock band Jonathan Fire*Eater
- Hikaru Utada* (2000), Japanese pop star
- Alicia Keys* (2001), Grammy Award-winning R&B singer and songwriter
- Brian Weitz (2001), founding member of experimental band Animal Collective
- Emily and Julia Bruskin (2002), members of the Claremont Trio
- Ken-David Masur (2002), musical director of the Milwaukee Symphony Orchestra, son of conductor Kurt Masur
- Ariana Ghez (2003), oboist
- Nico Muhly (2003), contemporary classical music composer
- Anna Bulbrook (2004), violinist formerly member of indie band The Airborne Toxic Event
- Alisa Weilerstein (2004), cellist and 2011 MacArthur Fellow
- Tristan Perich (2004), contemporary composer and sound artist
- Peter Cincotti (2005), pianist
- Ellen Reid (2005), composer and recipient of the 2019 Pulitzer Prize for Music
- Patrick Higgins (2006), composer, musician, producer
- Michael Barimo (2006), pop singer and whistler
- Rostam Batmanglij (2006), member of alt-rock band Vampire Weekend
- Ezra Koenig (2006), member of alt-rock band Vampire Weekend
- Chris Tomson (2006), member of alt-rock band Vampire Weekend
- Chris Baio (2007), member of alt-rock band Vampire Weekend
- Call Me Ace or Anthony Patterson (2011), rapper
- Adam Met (2013), member of pop band AJR
- Danny Mercer (2013), singer, songwriter and producer
- Nathan Chan (2014), cellist
- Conrad Tao (2015), composer, pianist, violinist
- Jack Met* (2019), member of pop band AJR
- Maude Latour (2022), singer-songwriter
- Annie Moon (2026), member of a co-ed K-Pop Group ALLDAY PROJECT

== Playwrights, screenwriters, producers, and directors ==
- Henry Churchill de Mille (1875), playwright and Georgist; father of film pioneers Cecil B. DeMille and William C. deMille
- William C. deMille (1900), screenwriter, director, playwright; second president of the Academy of Motion Picture Arts and Sciences; co-founder of the USC School of Cinematic Arts
- Edgar Allan Woolf (1901), screenwriter, The Wizard of Oz
- George Middleton (1902), playwright and president of the Dramatists Guild of America
- Herman Mankiewicz (1917), drama critic for The New Yorker and co-winner of the Academy Award for Best Original Screenplay for Citizen Kane
- Morrie Ryskind* (1917), winner of the Pulitzer Prize for Drama with George S. Kaufman for Of Thee I Sing and co-writer of The Cocoanuts, Animal Crackers, and A Night at the Opera
- Sam Spewack (1919), winner of the Tony Award for the book of Kiss Me, Kate
- Sidney Buchman (1923), screenwriter for Mr. Smith Goes to Washington and winner of the Academy Award for Writing Adapted Screenplay for Here Comes Mr. Jordan
- Guy Endore (1923), screenwriter for The Story of G.I. Joe
- Alvah Bessie (1924), screenwriter for Objective, Burma! and one of the Hollywood Ten
- Ferrin Fraser (1927), radio scriptwriter for Little Orphan Annie and Frank Buck
- Joseph Mankiewicz (1928), Academy Award-winning writer and director of All About Eve and A Letter to Three Wives
- Frank S. Nugent (1929), screenwriter for Fort Apache, She Wore a Yellow Ribbon, and The Quiet Man
- Robert F. Blumofe (1930), producer of Bound for Glory, nominated for the Academy Award for Best Picture
- Ben Maddow (1930), screenwriter for The Asphalt Jungle, God's Little Acre and The Mephisto Waltz
- Albert Maltz (1930), screenwriter for Destination Tokyo and one of the Hollywood Ten
- Arnold M. Auerbach (1932), Primetime Emmy Award-winning American comedy writer
- William Ludwig (1932), Academy Award-winning screenwriter, Interrupted Melody
- Martin Manulis (1935), CBS television and movie producer, Days of Wine and Roses, The Best of Broadway, Climax!, Suspense; creator of Playhouse 90; former president of 20th Century Fox Television
- Charles H. Schneer (1940), film producer known for his collaboration with Ray Harryhausen
- I.A.L. Diamond (1941), screenwriting partner of Billy Wilder; co-author of Some Like It Hot; co-winner of the Academy Award for Best Original Screenplay for The Apartment
- Don M. Mankiewicz (1942), television and film writer; Academy Award nominee for I Want to Live!
- Steve Krantz (1943), screenwriter and film producer, Fritz the Cat
- Ernest Kinoy (1947), television writer of Murrow, Roots, and Victory at Entebbe
- Merrill Brockway (1948), Emmy Award-winning television producer
- Saul Turteltaub (1954), Emmy Award-nominated television writer and producer
- William Kronick (1955), film and television writer, director and producer
- Stephen Schenkel (1956), TV producer, All My Children
- Milton Moses Ginsberg (1957), director, Coming Apart
- Doran William Cannon (1959), screenwriter of Skidoo and Brewster McCloud
- Richard Pearlman (1959), former director of the Washington National Opera as well as the training program at the Lyric Opera of Chicago
- Terrence McNally (1960), Tony Award-winning playwright; author of Kiss of the Spider Woman and Ragtime
- Michael Kahn (1961), artistic director of the Shakespeare Theatre Company in Washington, D.C.
- Brian De Palma (1962), director of Scarface, The Untouchables and Carrie
- Crawford Kilian (1962), Canadian novelist and professor at Capilano University
- Thomas H. Connell III (1964), chief stage manager of the Metropolitan Opera
- Christopher Trumbo (1964), screenwriter, The Don Is Dead; son of noted screenwriter Dalton Trumbo
- Paul Hirsch (1966), film editor, won the Academy Award for Best Film Editing in 1977 for his work on Star Wars
- John Litvack (1966), EVP and head of programming at The WB Network
- Arthur Albert (1969), cinematographer and television director
- Hoyt Hilsman (1970), playwright and screenwriter, son of former Assistant Secretary of State for East Asian and Pacific Affairs and Director of the Bureau of Intelligence and Research Roger Hilsman
- Glenn Switkes (1972), director and environmentalist
- Jim Jarmusch (1975), writer/director of the Coffee and Cigarettes series
- Howard Brookner (1976), director, Burroughs: The Movie, Robert Wilson and the Civil Wars
- Bill Condon (1976), winner of the Academy Award for Writing Adapted Screenplay for Gods and Monsters, director of Kinsey and Dreamgirls
- Ric Burns (1978), documentary filmmaker, New York: A Documentary Film, The Civil War
- Tony Kushner (1978), Academy Award-nominated screenwriter; winner of the Pulitzer Prize for Drama and Tony Award for Angels in America
- Michael Lehmann (1978), director of Heathers, 40 Days and 40 Nights, The Truth About Cats and Dogs and Hudson Hawk
- Cyril Christo (1982), filmmaker, son of Christo and Jeanne-Claude
- Ron Simons (1982), producer, four-time Tony Award winner
- P. J. Pesce (1983), co-creator of The Adventures of Chico and Guapo, director of From Dusk Till Dawn 3: The Hangman's Daughter
- Lodge Kerrigan (1985), motion picture screenwriter and director of Rebecca H.
- Scott McGehee (1985), director of Uncertainty
- Katharina Otto-Bernstein (1986), Emmy Award-nominated filmmaker, producer, screenwriter daughter of German industrialist Werner Otto, billionaire heiress to the Otto GmbH fortune
- Cecily Rhett (1987), film editor, Stranger Inside
- Garth Stein (1987), Academy Award-winning producer, The Lunch Date
- Dan Futterman (1989), two-time Academy Award nominee for writing Capote and Foxcatcher
- Jessica Bendinger (1988), writer of Bring it On and for Sex and the City
- Andrew W. Marlowe (1988), creator of Castle; writer of Air Force One, End of Days, and Hollow Man
- Lawrence Trilling (1988), showrunner of Parenthood and Goliath
- Maiken Baird (1989), documentary film producer, Client 9: The Rise and Fall of Eliot Spitzer
- Sam Bisbee (1990), Emmy Award-winning producer and composer
- Gina Fattore (1990), producer and writer of Dawson's Creek, Gilmore Girls, Parenthood, creator of Dare Me
- Jeff Rake (1990), television producer, writer of Boston Legal and creator of Manifest and The Mysteries of Laura
- Dede Gardner (1990), Academy Award-winning producer of 12 Years a Slave; president of Plan B Entertainment
- Jenji Kohan (1991), television writer, producer, creator of Orange Is the New Black and Weeds
- Ari Gold (1992), filmmaker, director of Adventures of Power
- Elizabeth Craft (1993), producer, screenwriter, Fantasy Island, The 100, Lie to Me
- Ethan McSweeny (1993), former artistic director of the American Shakespeare Center, recipient of a 2018 Helen Hayes Award
- Brian Yorkey (1993), playwright, co-winner of the 2010 Pulitzer Prize for Drama for writing the musical Next to Normal
- Anna Winger (1993), screenwriter, creator of miniseries Deutschland 83, Deutschland 86, and Unorthodox
- Imara Jones (1994), political journalist and director
- Nicole Kassell (1994), director and producer of Watchmen, winner of the 2020 Directors Guild of America Award for Outstanding Directing – Drama Series
- Tim Carvell (1995), head writer of The Daily Show and executive producer of Last Week Tonight with John Oliver
- Josh Fox (1995), Academy Award-nominated documentary director, Gasland
- Adam Egypt Mortimer (1995), director of Daniel Isn't Real, Archenemy
- Henry Alex Rubin (1995), Academy Award-nominated director, Murderball
- Julius Sharpe (1995), television writer and showrunner of Making History and United We Fall
- Ramin Bahrani (1996), writer-director of Man Push Cart, Chop Shop and Fahrenheit 451, 2021 Academy Award for Best Adapted Screenplay nominee
- Moira Demos (1996), filmmaker who produced Netflix documentary Making a Murderer
- Yana Gorskaya (1996), Academy Award-nominated film editor, Spellbound
- Cetywa Powell (1996), director and fine art photographer
- Courtney Lilly (1997), television producer, showrunner of Black-ish, Grown-ish, Mixed-ish
- Nancy Schwartzman (1997), director, Roll Red Roll
- Beau Willimon (1999), creator and producer of House of Cards; writer of the play Farragut North
- Vikram Gandhi (2000), director, Kumaré, Barry, reporter for Vice
- Andrew Goldberg (2000), creator of Netflix series Big Mouth
- Ned Benson (2001), director, The Disappearance of Eleanor Rigby
- Dan Harris (2001), Saturn Award-winning screenwriter, X2, Superman Returns; director, Imaginary Heroes
- Andrew Neel (2001), filmmaker, director of King Kelly, Goat
- Anna Boden (2002), co-writer of Half Nelson and director of Sugar, Captain Marvel
- Tze Chun (2002), award-winning director, Children of Invention
- Lang Fisher (2002), co-creator of Never Have I Ever, writer of 30 Rock and Brooklyn Nine-Nine, Peabody Award winner in 2008
- Susanna Fogel (2002), Emmy Award and BAFTA Award-nominated director
- Will Graham (2002), creator of the Onion News Network, showrunner of Mozart in the Jungle, Peabody Award winner in 2008
- Ashley Lyle (2002), screenwriter, showrunner of Yellowjackets
- Justin Marks (2002), screenwriter, The Jungle Book, Counterpart
- Katori Hall (2003), playwright, The Mountaintop, winner of the 2021 Pulitzer Prize for Drama
- Raamla Mohamed (2003), Emmy Award-nominated screenwriter, Little Fires Everywhere
- Graham Moore (2003), winner of the 2015 Academy Award for Best Adapted Screenplay for his screenplay of The Imitation Game
- Lucia Aniello (2004), director of Rough Night and Time Traveling Bong
- Gabe Liedman (2004), creator of Q-Force, writer of Brooklyn Nine-Nine, PEN15, Inside Amy Schumer and Kroll Show
- Zhang Mo (2005), Chinese director, daughter of Zhang Yimou
- Laura Goode (2006), author, columnist, and producer of Farah Goes Bang
- Matt Kaplan (2006), producer of young adult films, To All the Boys franchise
- Meera Menon (2006), Indian-American director, Equity
- Lilly Burns (2009), television producer, co-founder of Jax Media and president of Imagine Entertainment
- Eli Bush (2009), film and theatre producer and winner of the Golden Globe Award in 2018 for Lady Bird
- Jason Fuchs (2009), actor and screenwriter, Pan, Ice Age: Continental Drift
- Jessica Kingdon (2009), Academy Award-nominated Chinese-American documentary director
- Nuotama Bodomo (2010), Ghanaian filmmaker and co-writer of sketch comedy Random Acts of Flyness on HBO
- Sabaah Folayan (2013), director of documentary Whose Streets?

== Political and diplomatic figures ==
=== United States political and diplomatic figures ===
- Philip Van Cortlandt (1758), soldier, statesman, U.S. congressman from New York
- Anthony Hoffman (1760), member of the New York State Senate
- Gilbert Livingston (1760), member of the New York Provincial Congress
- Gulian Verplanck (1768), speaker of the New York State Assembly; president of the Bank of New York 1791–1799
- Philip Pell (1770), delegate for New York to the Congress of the Confederation
- Richard Varick (King's 1776), mayor of New York City and American Revolutionary War figure; aide-de-camp of Benedict Arnold and private secretary of George Washington
- David A. Ogden (178-), U.S. congressman from New York
- DeWitt Clinton (1786), governor of New York who initiated the construction of the Erie Canal; also served as United States senator from New York
- James Cochran (1788), U.S. congressman from New York
- Daniel C. Verplanck (1788), U.S. congressman from New York
- John Peter Van Ness (1789), U.S. congressman from New York and mayor of Washington, D.C.
- George Graham (1790), acting U.S. secretary of war under James Madison and James Monroe; commissioner of the General Land Office 1823–1830
- John Graham (1790), secretary of the Orleans Territory; U.S. minister to Portugal; acting United States secretary of state in 1817
- Jotham Post Jr. (1792), U.S. congressman from New York
- John Randolph of Roanoke* (1792), planter, U.S. congressman from Virginia, United States Senate from Virginia, U.S. ambassador to Russia; founder of the American Colonization Society
- George Clinton Jr. (1793), brother of DeWitt Clinton, and U.S. congressman from New York
- George Izard* (1793), general, politician; second governor of the Territory of Arkansas
- James Parker (1793), U.S. congressman from New Jersey
- Peter A. Jay (1794), son of Chief Justice John Jay; member of New York State Assembly and Recorder of New York City
- Cyrus King (1794), U.S. congressman from Massachusetts
- John Ferguson (1795), mayor of New York City
- Daniel D. Tompkins (1795), vice president of the United States; governor of New York
- Rensselaer Westerlo (1795), U.S. congressman from New York
- Edward Philip Livingston (1796), member of the New York State Senate, great-great-grandfather of Eleanor Roosevelt
- Rudolph Bunner (1798), U.S. congressman from New York
- John M. Bowers (1800s), U.S. congressman from New York
- Gulian C. Verplanck (1801), U.S. congressman from New York and chairman of the United States House Committee on Ways and Means
- Gouverneur Kemble (1803), U.S. congressman from New York and founder of the West Point Foundry
- John L. Lawrence (1803), member of New York State Assembly and New York State Senate
- Alpheus Sherman (1803), member of New York State Senate
- James Alexander Hamilton (1805), son of Alexander Hamilton, soldier, acting United States secretary of state under president Andrew Jackson, and U.S. attorney for the Southern District of New York 1829–1834
- Edmund H. Pendleton (1805), U.S. congressman from New York, great-nephew of Edmund Pendleton, first chief justice of Virginia
- Samuel B. Romaine (1806), speaker of the New York State Assembly
- Egbert Benson (1807), member of the Board of Aldermen of New York City and 4th president of the Saint Nicholas Society of the City of New York, nephew of founding father Egbert Benson
- Henry H. Ross (1808), U.S. congressman from New York
- Peter Dumont Vroom (1808), U.S. minister to Prussia and governor of New Jersey
- John Fine (1809), U.S. congressman from New York
- John Slidell (1810), Confederate minister to France and a central figure of the Trent Affair during the American Civil War; United States senator from Louisiana, brother-in-law of Admiral Matthew C. Perry
- Charles G. Ferris (1811), U.S. congressman from New York
- Van Brugh Livingston (1811), chargé d'affaires to Ecuador
- Nathanael G. Pendleton (1813), U.S. congressman from Ohio
- Samuel L. Gouverneur (1817), postmaster of New York City, private secretary, nephew, and son-in-law of President James Monroe
- James I. Roosevelt (1815), U.S. congressman from New York; brother of Cornelius Roosevelt
- William Beach Lawrence (1818), U.S. chargé d'affaires for Great Britain and acting governor of Rhode Island
- William F. Havemeyer (1823), three-time mayor of New York City
- William Duer (1824), U.S.congressman from New York
- John McKeon (1825): U.S. attorney, Southern District of New York; U.S. congressman from New York
- Hamilton Fish (1827), US secretary of state; governor of New York; United States senator from New York
- John Henry Hobart Haws (1827), U.S. congressman from New York
- John D. Van Buren (1829), member of New York State Assembly
- Henry Ledyard (1830), mayor of Detroit; president of Newport Hospital
- Henry Nicoll (1830), U.S. congressman from New York
- Henry C. Murphy (1830), U.S. congressman from New York; former U.S. ambassador to the Netherlands
- John L. O'Sullivan (1831), US minister to Portugal; journalist who coined the term " Manifest Destiny"; publisher of The United States Magazine and Democratic Review
- James William Beekman (1834), member of the New York State Senate; vice-president of the New York Hospital
- Isaac C. Delaplaine (1834), U.S. congressman from New York
- John Richardson Thurman (1835), U.S. congressman from New York
- John Jay (1836), grandson of Chief Justice John Jay; United States minister to Austro-Hungary; president of the American Historical Association
- John Vanderbilt (1837), judge, member of the New York State Senate
- William Ward Duffield (1841), officer, member of the Michigan Senate, superintendent of the U.S. National Geodetic Survey
- Abram Stevens Hewitt (1842), former mayor of New York City and planner of the first line of the New York City Subway system; Chairman of the Democratic National Committee 1876–1877, son-in-law of philanthropist Peter Cooper
- Edward Cooper (1842), former mayor of New York City and son of industrialist Peter Cooper
- Nicholas B. La Bau (1844), member of the New York State Assembly and the New York State Senate
- John Winthrop Chanler (1847), U.S. congressman from New York
- Horace Carpentier (1848), first mayor of Oakland, California and president of the Overland Telegraph Company
- A. Bleecker Banks* (1850s), mayor of Albany, New York; member of New York State Assembly and New York State Senate
- Galen A. Carter (1850), member of Connecticut Senate
- Stewart L. Woodford (1854), lieutenant governor of New York and U.S. minister to Spain
- Jacob Augustus Geissenhainer (1858), U.S. congressman from New Jersey
- George Lockhart Rives (1868), U.S. assistant secretary of state and chairman of the Columbia trustees
- Hamilton Fish II (1869), speaker of the New York State Assembly and U.S. congressman
- Thomas C. E. Ecclesine (1870), member of the New York State Assembly and the New York State Senate
- Seth Low (1870), mayor of New York City and president of Columbia University
- Oscar Solomon Straus (1871), first Jewish U.S. cabinet secretary, U.S. secretary of commerce and labor under Theodore Roosevelt, and U.S. ambassador to the Ottoman Empire, first president of the American Jewish Historical Society
- Robert Anderson Van Wyck (1871), first mayor of New York City to preside over all five boroughs
- Robert Ray Hamilton (1872), member of New York State Assembly, great-grandson of Alexander Hamilton
- P. Henry Dugro (1876), U.S. congressman from New York
- Benjamin Barker Odell Jr.* (1877), governor of New York; U.S. congressman from New York
- Thomas G. Patten (1879), U.S. congressman from New York
- Thomas F. Magner (1882), U.S. congressman from New York
- Thomas Ewing III (1883), 33rd commissioner of the United States Patent and Trademark Office
- Herbert L. Satterlee (1883), assistant secretary of the Navy 1908–1909, son-in-law of J. P. Morgan
- William Sulzer (1884), governor of New York
- J. Mayhew Wainwright (1884), U.S. congressman and assistant secretary of war
- Charles Henry Turner (1888), U.S. congressman from New York; doorkeeper of the United States House of Representatives 1891–1893
- James W. Gerard (1890), U.S. ambassador to Germany 1913–1917
- Victor M. Allen (1892), member of the New York State Senate
- John F. Carew (1893), U.S. congressman from New York
- Harvey R. Kingsley (1893), president pro tempore of the Vermont State Senate
- Edward Lazansky (1895), secretary of state of New York
- Carl L. Alsberg (1896), 2nd commissioner of Food and Drugs, head of the Food and Drug Administration 1912–1921
- Lewis Einstein (1898), U.S. ambassador to Czechoslovakia and U.S. ambassador to Costa Rica
- John Purroy Mitchel (1899), mayor of New York City
- Montgomery Schuyler Jr. (1899), U.S. minister to El Salvador and U.S. minister to Ecuador
- Charles H. Tuttle (1899), U.S. attorney for the Southern District of New York and 1930 Republican nominee for governor of New York
- Henry W. Shoemaker (1901), folklorist, historian, diplomat; U.S. ambassador to Bulgaria 1930–1933
- Martin C. Ansorge (1903), U.S. congressman from New York
- Stanley M. Isaacs (1903), Manhattan borough president 1938–1942
- Allen J. Bloomfield (1094), member of the New York State Assembly and the New York State Senate
- Fred Biermann (1905), U.S. congressman from Iowa
- John Collier (1906), U.S. commissioner of Indian Affairs
- Meyer Robert Guggenheim* (1907), U.S. ambassador to Portugal 1953–1954, grandson of Meyer Guggenheim
- Joseph C. O'Mahoney (1907), United States senator from Wyoming
- James W. Mott (1909), U.S. congressman from Oregon
- Emanuel Celler (1910), 39th dean of the United States House of Representatives; U.S. congressman from New York
- William Langer (1910), United States senator and governor of North Dakota
- Laurence Steinhardt (1913), former U.S. ambassador to Sweden, Peru, the Soviet Union, Turkey, Czechoslovakia and Canada; the first U.S. ambassador to be killed in office
- Henry Frank Holthusen (1915), lawyer, diplomat, U.S. ambassador to Czechoslovakia nominee
- Samuel Irving Rosenman (1915), 1st White House counsel to presidents Franklin D. Roosevelt and Harry S. Truman, name partner of Katten Muchin Rosenman
- Frederic René Coudert Jr. (1918), U.S. congressman from New York
- Harold F. Linder (1921), president of the Export-Import Bank of the United States 1961–1968; former U.S ambassador to Canada
- Arthur Levitt Sr. (1921), longest-serving New York state comptroller; father of Arthur Levitt, chairman of the United States Securities and Exchange Commission
- Joseph Zaretzki (1922), majority leader of the New York State Senate 1966–1974
- Louis M. Rousselot (1923), assistant secretary of defense for health and environment 1970–1971
- Joseph Campbell (1924), fourth comptroller general of the United States
- Arthur F. Burns (1925), chairman of the Federal Reserve and U.S. ambassador to West Germany
- Bernard M. Shanley (1925), White House counsel 1953–1955; secretary to the president of the United States under Dwight D. Eisenhower 1955–1957
- Joseph F. Finnegan (1928), director of the Federal Mediation and Conciliation Service 1955–1961
- Wolf Ladejinsky (1928), agricultural economist and researcher and key adviser on land reform in Asian countries
- James T. O'Connell (1928), U.S. deputy secretary of labor 1957–1961
- James J. Reynolds (1928), U.S. deputy secretary of labor 1967–1969
- William H. Shaw (1930), assistant secretary of commerce for Economic Affairs 1966–1968
- Boris Shishkin (1930), member of the President's Committee on Civil Rights and head of the AFL–CIO Department of Civil Rights
- Arthur E. Goldschmidt (1932), United States ambassador to the United Nations Economic and Social Council 1967–1969
- Reed Harris (1932), former deputy director of the United States Information Agency and victim of McCarthyism
- James Hagerty (1934), White House press secretary 1953–1961
- Hickman Price (1934), assistant secretary in the United States Department of Commerce 1961–1963; Kaiser-Frazer and Willys executive
- Faubion Bowers* (1935), General Douglas MacArthur's interpreter and aide-de-camp during the Allied Occupation of Japan
- Hunter Meighan (1935), member of the New York State Assembly and the New York State Senate
- Thomas Karamessines (1938), deputy director of CIA for operations 1967–1973
- A. Gerdes Kuhbach (1938), executive director of the Port Authority of New York and New Jersey 1973–1977
- Thibaut de Saint Phalle (1939), director of the Export–Import Bank of the United States 1977–1981
- Arthur R. Albohn (1942), member of the New Jersey General Assembly
- Richard T. Davies (1942), former U.S. ambassador to Poland
- David E. Mark (1943), former U.S. ambassador to Burundi
- J. Owen Zurhellen, Jr. (1943), first U.S. ambassador to Suriname
- Christian H. Armbruster (1944), member of the New York State Assembly and the New York State Senate
- Harold Brown (1945), U.S. secretary of defense and president of the California Institute of Technology
- Albert Burstein (1947), Democratic Party politician and former Majority leader of the New Jersey General Assembly
- Edward N. Costikyan (1947), Democratic Party politician and reformer who oversaw the dismantling of Tammany Hall; partner at Paul, Weiss, Rifkind, Wharton & Garrison
- Gardiner L. Tucker (1947), former director of IBM Research and assistant secretary of defense for System Analysis, assistant secretary general of NATO
- Jonathan Dean (1948), U.S. representative for Mutual and Balanced Force Reductions negotiations 1979–1981
- Roy H. McVicker (1948), U.S. congressman for Colorado's 2nd congressional district
- Monteagle Stearns (1948), former U.S. ambassador to Ivory Coast and U.S. ambassador to Greece
- Eugene Rossides (1949), lobbyist, football player drafted by the New York Giants in 1949, founder of the American Hellenic Institute, former U.S. assistant secretary of the treasury
- Donald A. Beattie (1951), assistant secretary for Conservation and Solar Applications in the United States Department of Energy and assistant administrator of the Energy Research and Development Administration
- Lawrence Pezzullo (1951), former U.S. ambassador to Uruguay, Nicaragua, and special envoy to Haiti; executive director of Catholic Relief Services 1983–1992
- Eric M. Javits (1952), former ambassador and permanent U.S. representative to the Conference on Disarmament in Geneva 2001–2003; U.S. permanent representative to the Organisation for the Prohibition of Chemical Weapons 2003–2009
- James D. Theberge (1952), former U.S. ambassador to Chile and Nicaragua
- G. Norman Anderson (1954), former U.S. ambassador to Sudan
- David J. Bardin (1954), deputy administrator of the Federal Energy Administration; commissioner of the New Jersey Department of Environmental Protection
- William Haddad (1954), political operative, lobbyist, and journalist, Peace Corps founding official, aide to the Kennedy family, and grandson-in-law of Franklin D. Roosevelt
- Richard E. Benedick (1955), president emeritus of the National Council for Science and the Environment, ambassador, and chief U.S. negotiator to the Montreal Protocol
- John L. Hirsch (1957), U.S. ambassador to Sierra Leone 1995–1998
- Morton Halperin (1958), deputy assistant secretary of defense, director of policy planning for the U.S. State Department, and member of Richard Nixon's Enemies List
- Shelby Brewer (1959), assistant secretary of energy for nuclear energy 1981–1984
- Benjamin Huberman (1959), acting director of the Office of Science and Technology Policy; acting science advisor to the president in 1981
- Pat Mullins (1959), chairman of the Republican Party of Virginia
- Constantine Menges (1960), national security aide to Ronald Reagan
- James E. Connor (1961), White House cabinet secretary and staff secretary to President Gerald Ford
- Brooks Firestone (1961), member of the California State Assembly from the 35th district 1994–1998, founder of Firestone Vineyard and grandson of Harvey S. Firestone
- Harvey Goldschmid (1962), professor at Columbia Law School, commissioner of the U.S. Securities and Exchange Commission 2002–2005
- John A. McMullen (1963), Vermont businessman and Republican Party candidate for the United States Senate representing Vermont in 1998, 2004, and Vermont Attorney General in 2012
- Jeff Bell (1965), Republican nominee for United States Senate from New Jersey in 1978, 1982, and in 2014
- Mark T. Cox IV (1966), former United States alternate executive director to the World Bank
- Allan I. Mendelowitz (1966), former chairman and director of the Federal Housing Finance Board
- Raymond Burghardt (1967), former director, and chairman of the American Institute in Taiwan and U.S. Ambassador to Vietnam
- Dick Morris (1967), political strategist and advisor to President Bill Clinton and Mexican President Felipe Calderón
- Mark C. Minton (1967), former U.S. ambassador to Mongolia, and former president of the Korea Society
- Robert Delahunty (1968), deputy general counsel, White House Office of Homeland Security 2002–2003; professor at University of St. Thomas School of Law
- Judd Gregg (1969), United States senator from New Hampshire; governor of New Hampshire; U.S. congressman
- Jerrold Nadler (1969), U.S. congressman from New York
- Daniel L. Feldman (1970), member of the New York State Assembly from the 45th district
- Dov Zakheim (1970), under secretary of defense 2001–2004; advisor to the US presidential administrations of Ronald Reagan and George W. Bush
- Bob Hackett (1971), member of the Ohio Senate from the 10th district
- Luis J. Lauredo (1972), U.S. ambassador to the Organization of American States 2001–2003
- Eric D. Coleman (1973), member of the Connecticut Senate
- Frank Dermody (1973), Democratic leader of the Pennsylvania House of Representatives
- Stephen J. Flanagan (1973), former United States National Security Council senior director for Central and Eastern Europe
- Steven Simon (1973), former United States National Security Council senior director for the Middle East and North Africa
- Bradford Higgins (1974), assistant secretary of state for resource management and chief financial officer of the United States Department of State
- Robert Wunderlich (1975), mayor of Beverly Hills, California
- Donald Yamamoto (1975), former U.S. ambassador to Ethiopia, Djibouti, and assistant secretary of state for African affairs, current U.S. ambassador to Somalia
- Gilberto de Jesús (1976), former Maryland secretary of juvenile justice 1997–1999
- Mozelle W. Thompson (1976), commissioner of the Federal Trade Commission 1997–2004
- Howard W. Gutman (1977), former U.S. ambassador to Belgium
- Robert E. Martinez (1977), 8th Virginia secretary of transportation and deputy administrator of the United States Maritime Administration
- David Paterson (1977), first African-American governor of New York
- Karl Dean (1978), mayor of Nashville
- Christopher Dell (1978), career diplomat, former US ambassador to Zimbabwe, Angola, and Kosovo
- Martin J. Dunn (1979), former mayor of Holyoke, Massachusetts and member of the Massachusetts Senate
- Jim McGreevey (1978), 53rd governor of New Jersey
- Andres Alonso (1979), former CEO of Baltimore City Public Schools
- Timothy Horrigan (1979), member of the New Hampshire House of Representatives
- Randal Quarles (1981), 15th under secretary of the treasury for domestic finance, chair of the Financial Stability Board and vice chairman of the Federal Reserve
- Andrew C. McCarthy (1981), assistant U.S. attorney and columnist for National Review
- Charles J. O'Byrne (1981), secretary to the governor of New York
- Michael Waldman (1982), speechwriter for president Clinton; president of the Brennan Center for Justice
- John Solecki (1982), U.S. official for the United Nations high commissioner for Refugees, kidnapped in Pakistan by the Balochistan Liberation United Front in 2009
- Barack Obama (1983), 44th president of the United States and first African-American to hold the office; former senator from Illinois; winner of the 2009 Nobel Peace Prize
- Victor Cha (1983), foreign policy expert; President Bush's top advisor on North Korean affairs
- Jay Lefkowitz (1984), George W. Bush's special envoy for human rights in North Korea
- Steven Waldman (1984), senior advisor to the chairman of the Federal Communications Commission and founder of Beliefnet
- John Delaney (1985), U.S. congressman for Maryland's 6th congressional district and candidate in the 2020 United States presidential election
- Julius Genachowski (1985), chairman of the Federal Communications Commission
- Hector Morales (1985), U.S. ambassador to the Organization of American States 2008–2009
- Daniel Lewis Foote (1986), former U.S. ambassador to Zambia
- Michael Mundaca (1986), former assistant secretary for tax policy in the U.S. Department of the Treasury
- Sharon Block (1987), acting administrator of the Office of Information and Regulatory Affairs, former member of the National Labor Relations Board and professor at Harvard Law School
- David M. Friedman (1987), current U.S. ambassador to Israel
- Matt Gonzalez (1987), Green Party San Francisco mayoral candidate and independent 2008 candidate for vice president running with Ralph Nader
- Tim Kelly (1989), 74th mayor of Chattanooga, Tennessee
- Julie Menin (1989), former chairperson of Manhattan Community Board 1 and former commissioner of the New York City Department of Consumer Affairs
- Dave Hunt (1990), 65th speaker of the Oregon House of Representatives and majority leader 2007–2009
- Michael Leiter (1991), principal deputy director of the National Counterterrorism Center; former deputy chief of staff for the Office of the Director of National Intelligence
- Melissa Mark-Viverito (1991), speaker of the New York City Council
- Benjamin Lawsky (1992), attorney and New York City's first superintendent of financial services
- Peter Hatch (1992), commissioner of the New York City Department of Consumer and Worker Protection
- Eric Garcetti (1992), member of the Los Angeles City Council and current mayor of Los Angeles, nominee to be U.S. ambassador to India
- Rohit Aggarwala (1993), commissioner of the New York City Department of Environmental Protection
- Matt Brown (1993), secretary of state of Rhode Island 2003–2007; co-founder of non-partisan group Global Zero
- Alan D. Cohn (1993), assistant secretary for strategy, planning, analysis & risk of the United States Department of Homeland Security
- Amit Bose (1994), acting administrator of the Federal Railroad Administration
- Karthik Ramanathan (1994), acting assistant secretary of the treasury for financial markets
- Frank Scaturro (1994), lawyer, public advocate who spearheaded the restoration of Grant's Tomb; Republican candidate for New York's 4th congressional district
- Radhika Fox (1995), acting assistant administrator for water of the United States Environmental Protection Agency
- Beto O'Rourke (1995), U.S. congressman for Texas's 16th congressional district and candidate in the 2020 United States presidential election
- Rebekah Gee (1997), secretary of the Louisiana Department of Health, daughter of Ohio State University president E. Gordon Gee
- Jay Carson (1999), executive director of C40 Cities Climate Leadership Group; former press secretary for Hillary Clinton and Howard Dean's presidential campaigns
- John Ray Clemmons (1999), member of the Tennessee House of Representatives from the 55th district
- George Demos (1999), former U.S. Securities and Exchange Commission prosecutor and Republican candidate for New York's 1st congressional district
- Robert Karem (2000), assistant secretary of defense for international security affairs and former acting under secretary of defense for policy
- David Segal (2001), member of the Rhode Island House of Representatives
- Robby Mook (2002), political campaign strategist and campaign manager for Virginia governor Terry McAuliffe, former executive director of Democratic Congressional Campaign Committee; campaign manager for Hillary Clinton presidential campaign, 2016
- Sam Arora (2003), member of the Maryland House of Delegates 2011–2015
- Cyrus Habib (2003), lieutenant governor of Washington, first and only Iranian American elected to a state office in the U.S.
- Adam Jentleson (2003), former deputy chief of staff to Harry Reid and columnist of GQ
- Nikil Saval (2005), former editor of N+1, member of the Pennsylvania State Senate
- Josie Raymond (2007), member of the Kentucky House of Representatives from the 31st district
- Ruthzee Louijeune (2008), president of the Boston City Council
- Sara Jacobs (2011), member of the United States House of Representatives for California's 53rd congressional district, granddaughter of Qualcomm founder Irwin M. Jacobs
- Peter Meijer (2012), politician, member of the United States House of Representatives for Michigan's 3rd congressional district, grandson of Frederik Meijer, founder of Meijer hypermarkets
- Shaun Abreu (2013), politician, Democratic nominee for New York City's 7th City Council district
- Julia Salazar* (2014), member of New York State Senate for Democratic Socialists of America

=== Foreign political and diplomatic figures ===
- Henry Cruger* (1758), member of the Parliament of Great Britain 1774–1790 and the New York State Senate
- Isaac Wilkins (1760), judge, member of the Nova Scotia House of Assembly
- Thomas Henry Barclay (1772), United Empire Loyalist; member of the 6th General Assembly of Nova Scotia
- Tang Shaoyi* (1882), first premier of the Republic of China
- William Sanford Evans (1895), Manitoba politician, mayor of Winnipeg 1909–1911
- Pixley ka Isaka Seme (1906), founder and president of the African National Congress
- Wellington Koo (1909), president of the Republic of China and China's ambassador to the United States; Chinese delegate to the Paris Peace Conference, 1919 and the League of Nations; judge on the International Court of Justice 1957–1967
- Jun Ke Choy (1915), former mayor of Hangzhou, chairman of China Merchants Group, and founder of the Chinese Culture Center
- Yu Tsune-chi (1922), Chinese ambassador to Italy and Spain, delegate to the San Francisco Conference, United Nations and the International Labour Organization
- Mario Laserna Pinzón (1948), Colombian diplomat and educator; founded the Universidad de Los Andes
- Colin Hughes (1949), first commissioner of the Australian Electoral Commission
- Uldis-Ivars Grava (1958), Latvian parliamentarian, former director of Latvijas Televīzija and chairman of American Latvian Association
- Johan Jorgen Holst (1960), Norwegian minister of Defence and Foreign Affairs; heavily involved with the Oslo Accords
- Yossi Alpher (1964), former Mossad officer and director of the Jaffee Center for Strategic Studies at Tel Aviv University
- Dore Gold (1975), Israeli political advisor and diplomat; former ambassador to the United States
- Toomas Hendrik Ilves (1975), president of Estonia
- Carson Wen (1975), three-time Hong Kong deputy to the National People's Congress and former vice chairman of the Democratic Alliance for the Betterment and Progress of Hong Kong
- Geoffrey Onyeama (1977), Nigerian minister of Foreign Affairs since 2015, son of Nigerian justice Charles Onyeama
- Michael Oren (1977), Israeli historian and former Israeli ambassador to the United States
- Miloon Kothari (1979), United Nations special rapporteur on adequate housing
- Kim Hyun-jong (1981), former South Korean minister of Trade and Special Advisor to President Moon Jae-in
- Ken Ofori-Atta (1984), Ghanaian economist and investment banker and current minister for Finance and Economic Planning, member of the Ofori-Atta family
- Akiva Tor (1985), Israeli ambassador to South Korea
- Abdullah bin Khalid bin Sultan Al Saud (2010), Saudi Arabia's permanent representative to the United Nations in Vienna, ambassador to Austria, Slovakia and Slovenia, great-grandson of Ibn Saud

== Publishers ==
- George Haven Putnam* (1864), publisher of G. P. Putnam's Sons, son of publisher George Palmer Putnam
- Henry S. Harper (1888), director of Harper and Brothers, Titanic survivor
- Bernard H. Ridder (1903), publisher of The St. Paul Dispatch and The Pioneer Press, chairman emeritus of Ridder Publications
- Alfred Harcourt (1904) and Donald Brace (1904), founders of Harcourt Brace
- Joseph E. Ridder (1907), publisher of The Journal of Commerce and chairman of Ridder Publications
- John Neville Wheeler (1908), founder and owner of the North American Newspaper Alliance and Bell Syndicate
- Harold Latham (1909), editor-in-chief of Macmillan Inc., known for discovering Margaret Mitchell
- Alfred A. Knopf (1912), founder and chairman of Alfred A. Knopf
- George T. Delacorte Jr. (1913), founder of Dell Publishing
- Arthur Hays Sulzberger (1913), publisher of The New York Times
- Douglas Black (1916), president of Doubleday and Company
- Bennett Cerf (1920), founder of Random House
- Donald S. Klopfer* (1922), founder of Random House
- Richard L. Simon (1920) and Max Lincoln Schuster (1919), co-founders of Simon & Schuster
- Elliott V. Bell (1925), former editor and publisher of Businessweek
- David A. Boehm (1934), founder of Sterling Publishing
- Robert Giroux (1936), chairman of Farrar, Straus and Giroux
- Ian Ballantine (1938), founder of Ballantine Books
- Walter B. Pitkin Jr. (1938), editor-in-chief and executive vice president of Bantam Books
- William D. Carey (1940), executive officer of the American Association for the Advancement of Science and publisher of Science 1975–1987
- Robert Bleiberg (1943), former publisher and managing editor of Barron's
- Gilman Kraft (1947), former owner and publisher of Playbill
- Jason Epstein (1949), editorial director of Random House and co-founder of the New York Review of Books
- Bernard Shir-Cliff (1949), editor of Ballantine Books and Warner Books
- Arthur Ochs Sulzberger (1951), publisher of The New York Times
- Lee Guittar (1953), former publisher of the San Francisco Examiner, The Denver Post, Dallas Times Herald, and president of USA Today
- Richard Goodwin Capen, Jr. (1956), former publisher of the Miami Herald; U.S. ambassador to Spain 1992–1993
- Peter Mayer (1956), publisher of Overlook Press and former CEO of Penguin Books
- Daniel Leab (1957), historian, antiquarian and publisher book catalogues, former editor of Labor History
- Donald Welsh (1965), founding publisher of outdoors magazine Outside
- Albert Scardino (1970), publisher of The Georgia Gazette and Pulitzer Prize winner in 1984
- Louis Rossetto (1971), founder and publisher of Wired magazine
- David Rothkopf (1977), CEO and editor of Foreign Policy magazine
- John R. MacArthur (1978), president and publisher of Harper's magazine, grandson of billionaire John D. MacArthur, benefactor of the MacArthur Fellows Program
- Jake Dobkin (1998), co-founder and publisher of Gothamist franchise

== Religious figures ==
- Samuel Provoost (1758), third Presiding Bishop of the American Episcopal Church
- John Beardsley (1761), Church of England clergyman in Canada; chaplain of the Loyal American Regiment
- Benjamin Moore (King's 1768), second bishop of the Episcopal Diocese of New York and president of Columbia College
- Philip Frederick Mayer (1799), Lutheran clergyman; founder of the Pennsylvania Bible Society, the first of its kind in the U.S.
- Henry Onderdonk (1805), second Episcopal bishop of Pennsylvania
- Jackson Kemper (1809), first missionary bishop of the Episcopal Church in the United States
- Benjamin Treadwell Onderdonk (1809), fourth bishop of the Episcopal Diocese of New York
- Richard Fish Cadle (1813), Episcopalian priest and first superior of Nashotah House
- Manton Eastburn (1817), fourth bishop of the Episcopal Diocese of Massachusetts
- Henry John Whitehouse (1821), second bishop of the Episcopal Diocese of Chicago
- George Washington Bethune* (1823), theologian and preacher
- John Chester Backus* (1830), Presbyterian minister
- Morgan Dix (1848), priest, theologian, rector of Trinity Church
- William Edmond Armitage (1849), second bishop of the Episcopal Diocese of Milwaukee
- George Franklin Seymour (1850), first bishop of the Episcopal Diocese of Springfield
- James DeKoven (1851), leader of the Anglo-Catholic movement in the Episcopal Church
- Marvin Vincent (1854), Presbyterian minister and professor at the Union Theological Seminary in the City of New York
- Daniel S. Tuttle (1857), first bishop of the Episcopal Diocese of Idaho, Montana, and Utah
- William David Walker (1859), first bishop of the Episcopal Diocese of North Dakota
- Henry Y. Satterlee (1863), first bishop of the Episcopal Diocese of Washington; established the Washington National Cathedral
- Bernard Drachman (1882), leader of Orthodox Judaism; former president of the Orthodox Union
- Leon Harrison (1886), rabbi of Temple Israel in St. Louis
- Herbert Shipman (1890), Suffragan bishop in the Episcopal Diocese of New York
- Stephen Samuel Wise (1892), rabbi and Zionist leader
- Frederick Herbert Sill (1895), Anglican monk and founder of the Kent School
- Henry S. Whitehead (1904), rector, and author of horror fiction
- Vedder Van Dyck (1918), fifth bishop in the Episcopal Diocese of Vermont
- Walter M. Higley (1922), sixth bishop of the Episcopal Diocese of Central New York
- M. Moran Weston (1930), Episcopal priest, social activist, and businessman who co-founded Carver Federal Savings Bank
- Arthur Lelyveld (1933), rabbi, president of the American Jewish Congress and first Jewish editor-in-chief of the Columbia Daily Spectator
- Moshe Davis (1936), rabbi and founder of Camp Ramah
- Paul van K. Thomson (1937), Roman Catholic priest, professor at Providence College
- Thomas Merton (1938), Trappist monk, writer, humanist; author of The Seven Storey Mountain
- Robert Farrar Capon (1946), Episcopal priest and author
- Wesley Frensdorff (1948), former Episcopal bishop of Nevada
- Haskel Lookstein (1953), Modern Orthodox Rabbi; spiritual leader of Congregation Kehilath Jeshurun and principal of Ramaz School since 1966
- Harold Kushner (1955), rabbi and writer
- Adi Da (1961), born Franklin Albert Jones, spiritual teacher; founder of a new religious movement, Adidam
- Michael Lerner (1964), liberal rabbi and editor of Tikkun magazine
- Elliot N. Dorff (1965), conservative rabbi, chairman of the Rabbinical Assembly's Committee on Jewish Law and Standards
- Joseph Goldstein (1965), vipassana expert
- Alan Senauke (1969), Soto Zen priest, folk musician, and poet residing at the Berkeley Zen Center; former director of the Buddhist Peace Fellowship
- Taigen Dan Leighton (1971), Soto Zen priest and teacher, academic at the Institute of Buddhist Studies
- C. John McCloskey (1975), Catholic priest who helped prominent figures convert to Catholicism, including Newt Gingrich, Bernard Nathanson, Sam Brownback, and Lawrence Kudlow
- Haviva Ner-David (1991), Israeli feminist activist and rabbi
- Sharon Brous (1995), first woman to be named most influential rabbi by Newsweek

== Scientists and inventors ==
- Samuel Bard* (1763), personal physician to George Washington; founder of the Columbia University College of Physicians and Surgeons
- John Stevens (King's 1768), builder of the first oceangoing steamboat in the U.S.
- Nicholas Romayne* (1774), physician, president of the Columbia University College of Physicians and Surgeons
- David Hosack (1790), physician, botanist, educator
- John Eatton Le Conte (1800), naturalist
- Samuel Akerly (1804), physician, co-founder of the New York Institute for the Education of the Blind
- Valentine Mott (1806), surgeon pioneer
- James Renwick (1807), English-American scientist and engineer, professor of Natural philosophy at Columbia University; father of architect James Renwick Jr.
- John Brodhead Beck (1813), New York physician
- Daniel Levy Maduro Peixotto (1816), Dutch-born Jewish American physician, former president of the Willoughby Medical College
- Henry James Anderson (1818), scientist and educator who participated in the U.S. Dead Sea exploration expedition
- Alfred Charles Post (1822), surgeon, professor at New York University School of MedicineS
- Horatio Allen (1823), imported the Stourbridge Lion, first successful steam locomotive to run in the U.S.
- John Clarkson Jay (1827), physician and notable conchologist, grandson of John Jay
- Alfred W. Craven (1829), chief engineering of Croton Aqueduct; founding member of the American Society of Civil Engineers
- Edward S. Renwick (1839), mechanical engineer, patent expert
- Oliver Wolcott Gibbs (1841), chemist, president of the National Academy of Sciences and the American Association for the Advancement of Science
- Robert Ogden Doremus* (1842), chemist and physician
- Cornelius Rea Agnew (1849), physician who helped founding the Manhattan Eye, Ear and Throat Hospital
- Henry Carrington Bolton (1862), chemist and bibliographer of science
- Stuyvesant Fish Morris (1863), physician, nephew of Hamilton Fish '27
- Rudolph August Witthaus (1867), toxicologist
- Frederick Remsen Hutton (1873), engineer, president of the American Society of Mechanical Engineers
- Sylvanus Albert Reed (1874), aerospace engineer who developed the modern metal aircraft propeller, which won the 1925 Collier Trophy
- William Hallock (1879), physicist, professor at Columbia University
- William Barclay Parsons (1879), chief engineer of the first line of the New York City Subway system, founder of multinational engineering firm Parsons Brinckerhoff
- Michael I. Pupin (1879), physicist, winner of the Pulitzer Prize for biography
- Henry Crampton (1893), evolutionary biologist
- Harold Jacoby (1894), astronomer and professor at Columbia University
- John Duer Irving (1896), geologist, professor at Sheffield Scientific School of Yale University
- Richard Weil (1896), physician, professor at Weill Cornell Medicine, son-in-law of Isidor Straus
- Hans Zinsser (1899), physician, bacteriologist, prolific author
- Marston T. Bogert (1890), former president of the American Chemical Society and the Society of Chemical Industry
- William King Gregory (1900), zoologist, primatologist, paleontologist
- Reuben Ottenberg (1902), physician and haematologist
- Clinton Gilbert Abbott (1903), ornithologist, naturalist, director of the San Diego Natural History Museum
- Irving Langmuir (1903), winner of the 1932 Nobel Prize in Chemistry
- Edward Calvin Kendall (1906), winner of the 1950 Nobel Prize in Physiology or Medicine
- Harold E. B. Pardee (1906), pioneer in electrocardiogram research, namesake of Pardee's sign
- Grover Loening (1908), aircraft manufacturer, founder of Loening Aeronautical Engineering; developed the Loening Model 23, which won the 1921 Collier Trophy
- Michael Heidelberger (1909), immunologist, "father of modern immunology"
- Ernst Philip Boas (1910), physician and professor at Columbia University College of Physicians and Surgeons, son of German-American anthropologist Franz Boas
- Hermann Joseph Muller (1910), geneticist and winner of the Nobel Prize in Physiology or Medicine
- Ralph Randles Stewart (1911), botanist and founder of the National Herbarium, Islamabad
- Ludlow Griscom (1912), pioneer in field ornithology
- John Howard Northrop (1912), winner of the 1946 Nobel Prize in Chemistry
- Calvin Bridges (1912), geneticist, protege of Thomas Hunt Morgan known for his contribution to genetics
- Irving H. Pardee (1912), neurologist, husband of Abby Rockefeller
- Alfred Sturtevant (1912), geneticist, protege of Thomas Hunt Morgan and winner of the National Medal of Science
- James Chapin (1916), ornithologist; 17th president of The Explorers Club
- Seeley G. Mudd (1917), physician and philanthropist, former dean of Keck School of Medicine of USC
- Harold Alexander Abramson (1919), early advocate of Psychedelic therapy
- Augustus Braun Kinzel (1919), metallurgist and first president of the National Academy of Engineering
- William V. Silverberg (1919), founder of the American Academy of Psychoanalysis and Dynamic Psychiatry
- Sherman Fairchild* (1920), founder of Fairchild Aircraft, Fairchild Industries, Fairchild Camera and Instrument as well as Fairchild Semiconductor
- Francis Bitter (1925), physicist, inventor of Bitter electromagnets
- Howard Bruenn (1925), personal physician to Franklin D. Roosevelt
- Albert Charles Smith (1926), botanist, former director of the National Museum of Natural History and the Arnold Arboretum
- Konrad Lorenz* (1926), winner of the Nobel Prize in Physiology or Medicine
- Jerrold R. Zacharias (1926), nuclear physicist, professor at Massachusetts Institute of Technology
- Andrew Streitwieser (1927), chemist known for his contributions to physical organic chemistry
- Julian M. Sturtevant (1927), chemist at Yale University
- Raymond D. Mindlin (1928), engineer, Medal for Merit and ASME Medal recipient
- Harold Charles Bold (1929), botanist
- Jule Eisenbud (1929), psychiatrist known for research into parapsychology
- Theodore Lidz (1930), Sterling Professor of psychiatry at Yale; expert on schizophrenia
- Judd Marmor (1930), psychoanalyst and psychiatrist on homosexuality
- Herbert L. Anderson (1931), director of the Enrico Fermi Institute, professor of the University of Chicago
- Paul E. Queneau (1931), professor of metallurgical engineering at Dartmouth College
- Bernard Glueck Jr. (1933), psychiatrist, former president of the American Psychopathological Association
- Irving Kaplan (1933), chemist, professor at Massachusetts Institute of Technology
- Leo Rangell (1933), psychoanalyst; president of the International Psychoanalytical Association and the American Psychoanalytic Association
- John K. Lattimer (1935), urologist, ballistics expert, and inveterate collector
- Emanuel Papper (1935), anesthesiologist, dean of the Miller School of Medicine at the University of Miami 1969–1981
- Norman Foster Ramsey Jr. (1935), winner of the Nobel Prize in Physics
- Robert Marshak (1936), president of the American Physical Society and president of the City College of New York
- Julian Schwinger (1936), winner of the Nobel Prize in Physics; posited the Schwinger effect
- Barry Commoner (1937), leading environmentalist, former editor of Science Illustrated magazine
- Francis J. Ryan (1937), professor of zoology at Columbia University
- Boris Jacobsohn (1938), professor of Physics at the University of Washington
- David B. Hertz (1939), operations research scholar known for pioneering the Monte Carlo methods in finance
- Victor Wouk (1939), pioneer in the development of electric and hybrid vehicles
- Julius Ashkin (1940), nuclear physicist, brother of Arthur Ashkin '47
- Jeremiah Stamler (1940), epidemiologist, expert in the field of preventive cardiology, professor emeritus at Northwestern University
- Ulrich P. Strauss (1941), chemist at Rutgers University, 1971 Guggenheim Fellow
- Bruce Wallace (1941), geneticist, professor at Virginia Tech
- Robert S. Wallerstein (1941), psychoanalyst and former president of the International Psychoanalytical Association and director of the Langley Porter Psychiatric Institute, brother of political scientist Immanuel Wallerstein '51
- Kimball Chase Atwood III (1942), geneticist, professor at Columbia University Medical School
- Leon Davidson (1942), chemical engineer known for his work in the Manhattan Project and the study of Unidentified Flying Objects
- Karl Koopman (1943), chiropterologist and curator at the American Museum of Natural History
- Robert G. Shulman (1943), biophysicist, Sterling Professor emeritus at Yale University
- Seymour Jonathan Singer (1943), cell biologist and professor at the University of California, San Diego
- Enoch Callaway (1943), psychiatrist, professor at the University of California, San Francisco
- Arnold Cooper (1944), psychoanalyst; professor at Weill Cornell Medical College and former president of the American Psychoanalytic Association
- Robert Jastrow (1944), astronomer, founder of NASA's Goddard Institute for Space Studies and conservative think tank George C. Marshall Institute
- Joshua Lederberg (1944), winner of the Nobel Prize in Physiology or Medicine
- Arnold Scheibel (1944), professor of neuroscience at the University of California, Los Angeles
- Alfred P. Wolf (1944), nuclear and organic chemist; research professor at New York University
- Paul Marks (1945), geneticist, president emeritus of the Memorial Sloan Kettering Cancer Center, former editor-in-chief of the Journal of Clinical Investigation
- Jack Oliver (1945), professor of seismology at Columbia University and Cornell University
- Malvin Ruderman (1945), physicist known for discovering the RKKY interaction
- Leonard Shengold (1946), psychiatrist at New York University known for study on child abuse
- Albert Starr (1946), cardiovascular surgeon, winner of the 2007 Lasker Award
- Arthur Ashkin (1947), winner of the Nobel Prize in Physics in 2018
- Robert A. Frosch (1947), fifth administrator of the National Aeronautics and Space Administration
- Norton Zinder (1947), scientist who discovered bacterial transduction
- Frank I. Marcus (1948), cardiologist and professor at University of Arizona Medical Center
- Frederick Reif (1948), professor of physics and psychology at Carnegie Mellon University, recipient of the 1994 Robert A. Millikan Award
- Robert Neil Butler (1949), president of the International Longevity Center and winner of the Pulitzer Prize for General Nonfiction
- William Chinowsky (1949), astrophysicist and professor at the University of California, San Diego
- Edgar Housepian (1949), neurosurgeon, co-founder of the Fund for Armenian Relief
- Benjamin Widom (1949), professor of chemistry at Cornell University; recipient of the Boltzmann Medal in 1998
- Noel Corngold (1950), physicist at California Institute of Technology
- Edwin Kessler (1950), first director of the National Severe Storms Laboratory
- Gerald Weissmann (1950), cell biologist, liposome inventor, essayist
- Arthur H. Westing (1950), ecologist and researcher at Stockholm International Peace Research Institute
- Leon Cooper (1951), winner of the Nobel Prize in Physics in 1972
- Richard A. Gardner (1952), psychiatrist known for researching Parental alienation syndrome
- Edgar Haber (1952), former president of Bristol-Myers Squibb and professor at Harvard Medical School
- Donald E. Ross (1952), engineer and managing partner at Jaros, Baum & Bolles
- William Carl Burger (1953), botanist, curator at the Field Museum of Natural History
- Gerald Feinberg (1953), physicist who coined the term "tachyon"
- Bernard Friedland (1953), professor and engineer, New Jersey Institute of Technology, recipient of the 1982 Rufus Oldenburger Medal
- Arthur Gottlieb (1953), immunologist, professor at Tulane University School of Medicine
- Eliot S. Hearst (1953), psychologist, professor at Indiana University
- Charles Kadushin (1953), psychologist at the City University of New York, recipient of the 2009 Marshall Sklare Award
- Donald R. Olander (1953), professor of nuclear engineering at University of California, Berkeley
- Nicholas P. Samios (1953), former director of the Brookhaven National Laboratory
- Melvin Schwartz (1953), winner of the Nobel Prize in Physics in 1988
- Wallace Smith Broecker (1953), professor of environmental science at Columbia University, developed the idea of a global "conveyor belt" linking ocean circulation
- Richard K. Bernstein (1954), physician and advocate for low-carbohydrate diet
- Henry Buchwald (1954), professor of surgery and biomedical engineering at University of Minnesota
- Neil D. Opdyke (1955), geologist
- Alvin F. Poussaint (1956), professor of psychiatry and dean of freshmen at the Harvard Medical School
- A. Charles Catania (1957), psychologist, professor at University of Maryland, Baltimore County
- Sheldon Saul Hendler (1957), scientist, physician, and musician
- Ralph Feigin (1958), pediatrician; former president and CEO of Baylor College of Medicine and physician-in-chief of Texas Children's Hospital
- Roald Hoffman (1958), winner of the Nobel Prize in Chemistry
- Norbert Hirschhorn (1958), public health physician and developed the Oral rehydration therapy
- Gerald T. Keusch (1958), professor of the Boston University School of Public Health and director of the John E. Fogarty International Center at the National Institutes of Health
- Harlan Lane (1958), professor of psychology at Northeastern University
- Hans Christian von Baeyer (1958), physicist at the College of William & Mary
- Joseph L. Fleiss (1959), professor of biostatistics at the Columbia University Mailman School of Public Health
- Allan Franklin (1959), physicist, historian of science at University of Colorado Boulder
- Paul B. Kantor (1959), information scientist, professor at Rutgers University
- Michael Lesch (1960), physician and medical educator who identified the Lesch–Nyhan syndrome
- Ira Black (1961), physician and neuroscientist, advocate of Stem cell research; former president of Society for Neuroscience
- Kenneth C. Edelin (1961), physician known for his support of abortion rights; former chairman of Planned Parenthood
- Eugene Milone (1961), astronomer, professor at the University of Calgary
- Robert Pollack (1961), biologist who studies the intersections between science and religion
- Samuel Strober (1961), immunologist at Stanford Medical School, co-founder of Dendreon
- Charles Cantor (1962), molecular geneticist; chief science officer at Sequenom
- Armando Favazza (1962), author and psychiatrist at the University of Missouri
- Stephen Larsen (1962), psychologist and founding board member of the Joseph Campbell Foundation
- Robert Lefkowitz (1962), winner of the Nobel Prize in Chemistry
- Jeffrey Mandula (1962), physicist known for the Coleman–Mandula theorem
- Allen Neuringer (1962), psychologist, prominent in the field of the experimental analysis of behavior
- Farhad Ardalan (1963), Iranian high energy physicist and professor at Sharif University and the Institute for Studies in Theoretical Physics and Mathematics.
- Harvey Cantor (1963), immunologist, professor of microbiology & immunobiology at Harvard Medical School
- David B. Cohen (1963), psychologist, professor at the University of Texas at Austin
- Allen Frances (1963), psychiatrist at Duke University; founding editor of the Journal of Personality Disorders and Journal of Psychiatric Practice
- David George Hitlin (1963), physicist at the California Institute of Technology
- Michael Lubell (1963), physicist, professor of the City College of New York
- Kenneth X. Robbins (1963), psychiatrist, scholar on expatriate communities in India
- Richard Waldinger (1963), computer scientist, fellow of the Association for the Advancement of Artificial Intelligence
- Allan Blaer (1964), physicist and professor who is in charge of the Columbia University Science Honors Program
- Frederick Kantor (1964), physicist, inventor of glancing incidence X-ray telescope
- Richard A. Muller (1964), professor of physics at the University of California, Berkeley; winner of the MacArthur Fellowship in 1982 and the Alan T. Waterman Award in 1978; founder of climate science institute Berkeley Earth
- Kenneth Prager (1964), physician, professor at Columbia University Medical Center, brother of commentator Dennis Prager
- Mark C. Rogers (1964), physician, former CEO of Duke University Health System
- Michael Terman (1964), Columbia University Medical Center psychologist
- Norman Christ (1965), physicist, professor at Columbia University
- Niles Eldredge (1965), collaborator of Stephen Jay Gould and curator of the Department of Invertebrates at the American Museum of Natural History
- Alan I. Green (1965), professor at Geisel School of Medicine, nephew of Herman Wouk
- Stuart Newman (1965), developmental and evolutionary biologist
- Allen Steere (1965), rheumatologist and pioneering investigator of Lyme disease
- Sylvain Cappell (1966), mathematician, professor at the Courant Institute of Mathematical Sciences
- Barry S. Coller (1966), father of Abciximab, vice president and physician-in-chief at Rockefeller University
- Peter Gray (1966), psychologist; professor at Boston College
- Brian Weiss (1966), psychiatrist noted for his research on reincarnation and past life regression
- Richard Axel (1967), winner of the Nobel Prize in Physiology or Medicine for studying the operations of the olfactory system
- Nai Phuan Ong (1967), professor of Physics at Princeton University
- Nick Scoville (1967), professor of astronomy at California Institute of Technology
- Robert Wald (1968), theoretical physicist at the University of Chicago
- Sidney R. Nagel (1969), University of Chicago physicist specializing in the complex physics of everyday materials
- Thomas B. Kornberg (1970), biochemist who was the first to purify and characterize DNA polymerase II and DNA polymerase III
- Harold J. Vinegar (1970), former chief scientist for physics of Shell plc, professor at Ben-Gurion University of the Negev
- Franklin G. Miller (1971), bioethicist at the National Institutes of Health
- Eric Rose (1971), cardiothoracic surgeon known for performing the first successful paediatric heart transplant; former president of the International Society for Heart and Lung Transplantation
- Paul S. Appelbaum (1972), psychiatrist credited with conceptualizing the idea of therapeutic misconception
- Steven M. Bellovin (1972), professor of computer science at Columbia University and chief technologist of Federal Trade Commission
- Rick L. Danheiser (1972), chemist and chair of the faculty at Massachusetts Institute of Technology
- Mitchell Kronenberg (1973), immunologist, former president of the La Jolla Institute for Immunology and secretary of the American Association of Immunologists
- Stephen M. Barr (1974), author and professor of physics and astronomy at the University of Delaware
- David Jablonski (1974), professor of geophysical sciences at University of Chicago
- Mark G. Lebwohl (1974), dermatologist and president of the American Academy of Dermatology
- Robert F. Murphy (1974), computational biologist and professor at Carnegie Mellon University
- Steven Kahn (1975), astrophysicist, professor at Stanford University and director of the Large Synoptic Survey Telescope
- Andrew Witkin (1975), professor of computer science at Carnegie Mellon University and Pixar senior scientist, recipient of the 2006 Academy Scientific and Technical Award
- Steven L. Goldstein (1976), geochemist, professor at Columbia University
- John Markowitz (1976), psychiatrist, professor at Columbia College of Physicians and Surgeons
- Douglas Rivers (1977), professor at Stanford University, chief scientist of global polling firm YouGov
- David Tannor (1978), chemist, professor at the Weizmann Institute of Science
- George Yancopoulos (1980), billionaire biomedical scientist and CSO of Regeneron Pharmaceuticals
- Carl Haber (1980), physicist and winner of the MacArthur Fellowship in 2013
- Jonathan E. Aviv (1981), surgeon known for inventing the Flexible Endoscopic Evaluation of Swallowing with Sensory Testing technique and developing the transnasal esophagoscopy method
- Adrian R. Krainer (1981), co-winner of the 2018 Breakthrough Prize in Life Sciences
- Neil Shubin (1982), paleontologist and co-discoverer of Tiktaalik, provost of the Field Museum of Natural History
- Michael Travisano (1983), evolutionary biologist and professor at University of Minnesota, Twin Cities
- Peter Lunenfeld (1984), critic and theorist of digital media
- Peter Marks (1985), director of the Center for Biologics Evaluation and Research and member of the White House Coronavirus Task Force
- James Nowick (1985), professor of chemistry at the University of California, Irvine
- Eric M. Genden (1987), head and neck surgeon who performed the first jaw transplant using the patient's jaw and bone marrow
- Geoffrey Miller (1987), psychologist, professor at the University of New Mexico
- Leslie B. Vosshall (1987), neurobiologist known for her contributions in the field of olfaction
- Patrick Ball (1988), data scientist, executive director of the Human Rights Data Analysis Group
- Rebecca N. Wright (1988), computer scientist and professor at Barnard College, former director at DIMACS
- Jonathan Rosand (1989), professor of neurology at Harvard Medical School, son of art historian David Rosand '59
- Christopher S. Ahmad (1990), head team physician of the New York Yankees and professor of Columbia University Vagelos College of Physicians and Surgeons
- Jennifer Ashton (1991), physician, author, host of lifestyle talk show The Revolution
- Virginia Cornish (1991), professor of chemistry at Columbia University and recipient of the 2009 Pfizer Award in Enzyme Chemistry
- Carl Marci (1991), neuroscientist and professor at Harvard Medical School
- Peter DiMaggio (1992), structural engineer, co-CEO of Thornton Tomasetti
- Damon Horowitz (1993), Google's in-house philosopher
- Chris Wiggins (1993), professor of applied mathematics at Columbia University, chief data scientist of The New York Times
- Rebecca Oppenheimer (1994), curator in astrophysics the American Museum of Natural History
- Demetre Daskalakis (1995), physician and gay health activist, White House National Monkeypox Response deputy coordinator
- Laura Kaufman (1997), chemist, professor at Columbia University
- Beth Willman (1998), astronomer at Haverford College
- Kate Brauman (2000), water scientist at the University of Minnesota, daughter of chemist John Isaiah Brauman
- Alex K. Shalek (2004), professor at Institute for Medical Engineering and Science, Massachusetts Institute of Technology
- Kerstin Perez (2005), particle physicist and professor at Columbia University
- Daniel Harlow (2006), professor at Massachusetts Institute of Technology, winner of the 2019 New Horizons in Physics Prize
- Aaron Roth (2006), professor of computer science at University of Pennsylvania
- Andrea Young (2006), experimental physicist at the University of California, Santa Barbara, winner of the 2018 New Horizons in Physics Prize
- Julia Kalow (2008), chemist, professor at Northwestern University
- Calvin Sun (2008), emergency room doctor known for his first-hand reporting on the COVID-19 pandemic in New York City

== Spies ==
- John Vardill (1766), loyalist educator, pamphleteer, spy
- William Joseph Donovan (1905), head of the Office of Strategic Services, predecessor to the Central Intelligence Agency, "father of American intelligence"
- Isaiah Oggins (1920), communist activist and Soviet spy
- Whittaker Chambers* (1924), Soviet spy and accuser of Alger Hiss
- Nathaniel Weyl (1931), operative in the Ware group of Soviet spies in the U.S.
- Victor Perlo (1933), leader of the Perlo group of Soviet spies in the U.S.
- Frank Snepp (1965), former CIA station chief for Saigon during the Vietnam War

== Writers ==
- Clement Clarke Moore (1798), purported author of A Visit From St. Nicholas
- Robert Charles Sands (1815), poet and writer
- Charles Fenno Hoffman (1825), poet, translator, and editor, founder of The Knickerbocker magazine
- Cornelius Mathews* (1834), writer of the Young America movement
- Evert Augustus Duyckinck (1835), literary biographer in the Young America movement
- George Templeton Strong (1838), noted diarist; founder of the United States Sanitary Commission and the Union League Club of New York
- Edgar Fawcett (1867), novelist
- William Dudley Foulke (1869), literary critic, journalist, and reformer; former United States Civil Service Commission commissioner
- Duffield Osborne (1879), author
- John Kendrick Bangs (1883), author, satirist, editor of Puck magazine
- John Armstrong Chaloner (1883), writer and activist, brother of Lewis Stuyvesant Chanler and William A. Chanler, son of John Winthrop Chanler '47, husband of Amélie Rives Troubetzkoy
- Albert Payson Terhune (1893), author, dog breeder, journalist, Further Adventures of Lad
- Guy Wetmore Carryl (1895), humorist, Fables for the Frivolous
- Melville Henry Cane (1900), poet; winner of the Robert Frost Medal in 1971
- Joyce Kilmer (1908), poet and author of Trees
- Randolph Bourne (1912), essayist and public intellectual
- Harold Lamb (1915), writer, screenwriter
- Gustav Davidson (1919), poet, secretary of the Poetry Society of America
- Paul Gallico* (1919), author of The Poseidon Adventure
- Louis Zukofsky (1922), co-founder and leading theorist of the Objectivist poets
- James Warner Bellah (1923), Western and pulp writer whose stories formed the basis of such John Ford classics as Fort Apache, She Wore a Yellow Ribbon, and Rio Grande.
- Corey Ford* (1923), humorist, The John Riddell Murder Case
- Henry Morton Robinson (1923), author of The Cardinal and A Skeleton Key to Finnegans Wake
- Cornell Woolrich (1923), mystery writer and author of Rear Window
- Clifford Dowdey (1925), author on the American Civil War
- Herman Wouk (1934), author of War and Remembrance and winner of the Pulitzer Prize for Fiction for The Caine Mutiny
- John Berryman (1936), winner of the Pulitzer Prize for Poetry
- Robert Paul Smith (1936), author of Where Did You Go? Out. What Did You Do? Nothing.
- Robert Lax (1938), minimalist poet
- Ed Rice (1940), Beat Generation writer
- Walter Farley (1941), author of The Black Stallion and its many sequels
- Thomas Gallagher (1941), winner of a 1960 Edgar Award and National Book Award for Fiction finalist
- Gerald Green (1942), writer of Holocaust and The Last Angry Man, co-creator of NBC's The Today Show
- Richard de Mille* (1944), writer and investigative journalist, son of director Cecil B. DeMille
- Jack Kerouac* (1944), Beat Generation author of On the Road
- Leonard Koppett (1944), sportswriter; recipient of the J. G. Taylor Spink Award and the Curt Gowdy Media Award
- Walter Wager (1944), mystery writer whose book 58 Minutes was adapted into Die Hard 2
- Herbert Gold (1946), Beat Generation novelist
- Daniel Hoffman (1947), poet; 22nd United States Poet Laureate
- Hiag Akmakjian (1948), author
- Allen Ginsberg (1948), Beat Generation poet; author of Howl
- Frederick Karl (1948), literary biographer famous for his work on Joseph Conrad
- Stanley Loomis (1948), American expatriate writer
- Charles Simmons (1948), author, winner of the 1965 William Faulkner Foundation Award for notable first novel
- Louis Simpson (1948), poet; winner of the 1964 Pulitzer Prize for Poetry
- John Clellon Holmes (1949), Beat Generation novelist, Go
- John Hollander (1950), poet, MacArthur Fellow and winner of the Bollingen Prize
- Richard Howard (1951), translator and winner of the Pulitzer Prize for Poetry
- Anthony Robinson (1953), English professor and novelist
- Ralph Schoenstein (1953), humorist
- Dan Wakefield (1955), novelist, journalist, screenwriter
- John J. Clayton (1956), fiction writer, novelist
- Robert Silverberg (1956), science fiction writer, recipient of the Damon Knight Memorial Grand Master Award in 2004
- Paul Zweig (1956), poet, memoirist, 1976 Guggenheim Fellow
- George Bellak (1957), television writer
- Richard P. Brickner (1957), writer, 1983 Guggenheim Fellow
- Raymond Federman (1957), French–American novelist and academic; author, Double or Northing
- Lawrence Shainberg (1958), writer of Zen Buddhism
- Jerome Charyn (1959), novelist
- Jay Neugeboren (1959), novelist, essayist, short story writer
- Robert T. Westbrook* (1968), writer, son of syndicated columnist Sheilah Graham Westbrook
- Phillip Lopate (1964), essayist and fiction writer
- Ron Padgett (1964), poet and translator, winner of the Shelley Memorial Award in 2009 and Robert Frost Medal in 2018
- Steven Millhauser (1965), novelist and winner of the Pulitzer Prize for Fiction for Martin Dressler: The Tale of an American Dreamer
- Aaron Fogel (1967), poet
- Eric Van Lustbader (1967), espionage and thriller novelist, writer of Jason Bourne novels
- Thomas Hauser (1968), author of nonfiction and biographer
- David Shapiro (1968), poet, literary critic, professor at William Paterson University
- Hilton Obenzinger (1969), novelist, poet, history and criticism writer
- Paul Auster (1970), postmodern writer; author of The New York Trilogy, Moon Palace, and the Brooklyn Follies
- Bob Holman (1970), poet and activist identified with the oral tradition
- David Lehman (1970), poet, editor of The Best American Poetry series
- Joshua Rubenstein (1971), writer, winner of a National Jewish Book Award in 2002
- Alex Abella (1972), Cuban-American writer
- Brad Gooch (1973), writer, professor of English at William Paterson University
- John Prados (1973), author and historian on World War II and the Cold War
- Todd McEwen (1975), writer, professor at the University of Kent
- Stephen O'Connor (1975), writer and professor at Sarah Lawrence College
- Damien Bona (1977), chronicler of the Academy Awards
- Mason Wiley (1977), co-author of The Official Preppy Handbook
- Kevin Baker (1980), novelist and freelance journalist
- Jeffrey Harrison (1980), poet who won the 1988 Amy Lowell Poetry Travelling Scholarship
- Lou Antonelli (1981), science fiction writer
- Douglas Sadownick (1981), writer and psychologist
- Michael Friedman (1982), novelist and author
- Michael Azerrad (1983), author, journalist, musician
- Thomas Dyja (1984), writer, historian, winner of the 1997 Casey Award
- David Rakoff (1986), comedic essayist
- Louise Wareham Leonard (1987), writer
- Al Weisel (1987), freelance writer
- Adrienne Brodeur (1988), author, program director at Aspen Institute
- Glen Hirshberg (1988), author, recipient of the 2007 Shirley Jackson Award
- Adam Mansbach (1988), author and former professor of literature at Rutgers University–Camden
- Darryl Pinckney (1988), novelist, playwright, and essayist
- Mako Yoshikawa (1988), novelist, professor at Emerson College
- Ben Coes (1989), author of political thriller and espionage novels
- Wade Graham (1989), author, historian, environmentalist
- G. Winston James (1989), poet, author, activist
- Robert Salkowitz (1989), author on technology innovation
- Carol Guess (1990), novelist and poet; professor at Western Washington University
- John Reed (1990), novelist; author of Snowball's Chance
- David S. Levinson (1991), short-story writer and novelist
- Robert Kolker (1991), writer, author of Hidden Valley Road
- Kelly Link (1991), Hugo Award-winning author; founder of Small Beer Press; editor of St. Martin's Press's Year's Best Fantasy and Horror
- Loren Goodman (1991), postmodern poet, professor at Underwood International College
- Andrew Carroll (1992), author, editor, activist, and historian
- Jordan Davis (1992), poet
- John Bemelmans Marciano (1992), children's book author and illustrator, grandson of Ludwig Bemelmans, author of Madeline
- Marie Mutsuki Mockett (1992), writer
- Melissa de la Cruz (1993), writer known for work in young adult fiction
- Jay Michaelson (1993), writer and LGBTQ activist
- Maxine Swann (1994), fiction writer
- Robert Westfield (1994), writer who won two Lambda Literary Awards
- Megan McCafferty (1995), chick lit writer, Jessica Darling series, which were plagiarized by Kaavya Viswanathan
- Tova Mirvis (1995), author
- Saleemah Abdul-Ghafur (1996), author and Islamic activist
- Fredrik Stanton (1996), author of Great Negotiations and former publisher for the Columbia Daily Spectator
- Aravind Adiga (1997), Man Booker Prize-winning novelist
- Jamel Brinkley (1997), author, winner of the 2018 Ernest J. Gaines Award for Literary Excellence
- John Coletti (1997), author
- Gotham Chopra (1997), author, son of health advocate Deepak Chopra
- Lauren Grodstein (1997), author, professor of Rutgers University–Camden
- Abdi Nazemian (1998), Iranian-American author, winner of the 2017 Lambda Literary Award for Debut Fiction
- Trevor Shane (1998), writer
- Daniel Alarcón (1999), novelist
- Katherine Howe (1999), novelist, author of The Physick Book of Deliverance Dane
- Rebecca Pawel (1999), author of mystery novels; winner of the 2004 Edgar Allan Poe Award for Best First Novel
- Alex Marzano-Lesnevich (2001), author, winner of a 2018 Lambda Literary Award and Chautauqua Prize
- Fiona Sze-Lorrain (2003), French writer, poet, translator, musician
- Ben Dolnick (2004), writer, son of biographer Edward Dolnick, member of the Ochs-Sulzberger family that owns The New York Times
- Danielle Valore Evans (2004), fiction writer
- Adam Gidwitz (2004), author of best selling children's books
- Alaya Dawn Johnson (2004), author and winner of the 2015 Andre Norton Award
- Tongo Eisen-Martin (2004), poet laureate of San Francisco
- Sidik Fofana (2005), public school teacher and writer, winner of a 2023 Whiting Award
- Victoria Loustalot (2006), writer of memoir and essays
- Crystal Hana Kim (2009), writer, If You Leave Me
- Morgan Parker (2010), poet and Cave Canem Fellow
- Rachel Heng (2011), Singaporean writer
- Ben Philippe (2011), author, screenwriter, recipient of the 2020 William C. Morris Award
- Rowan Hisayo Buchanan (2012), British-American writer, recipient of the Betty Trask Award and the Authors' Club Best First Novel Award
- Sylvia Khoury (2012), writer and playwright, recipient of a 2021 Whiting Award
- Yanyi (2013), poet

== Miscellaneous ==
- John Parke Custis* (1777), stepson of George Washington
- Philip Hamilton (1800), eldest son of Alexander Hamilton and Elizabeth Schuyler Hamilton
- David Augustus Clarkson (1810), landowner and grandson-in-law of Robert R. Livingston
- James Lenox (1818), bibliophile, founder of the Lenox Library, later incorporated into the New York Public Library; also founder of the Presbyterian Hospital
- John Lloyd Stephens (1822), explorer, archaeologist, special ambassador to Central America, and president of the Panama Railroad
- William R. Travers (1838), founder of the Travers Stakes
- William H. Herriman (1849), expatriate American art collector
- Cornelius Jeremiah Vanderbilt* (1850), son of Cornelius Vanderbilt
- Augustus Newbold Morris (1860), socialite and former president of The Metropolitan Club
- Winthrop Rutherfurd (1884), socialite known for his romance with Consuelo Vanderbilt and marriage to Lucy Mercer Rutherfurd, mistress of Franklin D. Roosevelt
- Gavin Arthur (1922), San Francisco astrologer and sexologist; grandson of U.S. President Chester A. Arthur
- Oswald Jacoby (1922), bridge player
- Fred Glazer (1958), librarian and director of the West Virginia Library Commission
- Arthur MacArthur IV (1960), son of General of the Army Douglas MacArthur
- Ashrita Furman (1976), holder of the most Guinness Book of World Records records
- Daniel Kottke (1977), college friend of Steve Jobs and 12th employee of Apple Inc.
- Sergey Kudrin (1981), chess grandmaster and three-time winner of the U.S. Open Chess Championship
- Peter Bacanovic (1984), Martha Stewart's stockbroker; involved in the ImClone scandal
- Annie Duke (1987), professional poker player
- Greg Giraldo (1987), stand-up comedian
- Anna Ivey (1994), admissions counsellor
- Chubby Hubby or Aun Koh (1996), Singaporean food and travel blogger
- Emily Drabinski (1997), librarian and educator, president of the American Library Association
- Tinsley Mortimer (1999), socialite and television personality
- Chloe Arnold (2002), Internationally acclaimed tap dancer
- La Carmina (2005), alternative blogger on Gothic and Japanese pop culture
- Alison Desir (2007), activist, runner
- John Cochran (2009), winner of Survivor: Caramoan
- Leeza Mangaldas (2011), Indian podcaster and sex educator
- Sara Ali Khan (2016), daughter of Indian actor, director Saif Ali Khan and actress Amrita Singh
