= Columbia Business School =

Business school of Columbia University

Coordinates: 40.80998°N 73.96096°W

Columbia University Graduate School of Business
- Former name: School of Business (1916–1953)
- Type: Private business school
- Established: 1916; 110 years ago
- Parent institution: Columbia University
- Accreditation: AACSB International
- Endowment: $869 million (2022)
- Dean: Costis Maglaras
- Academic staff: 136
- Postgraduates: 1,433
- Doctoral students: 100
- Location: New York City, New York, United States
- Campus: Urban
- Website: business.columbia.edu

The Columbia University Graduate School of Business, branded as Columbia Business School (CBS), is the business school of Columbia University, a private research university in New York City. Established in 1916, Columbia Business School is one of six Ivy League business schools and one of the oldest business schools in the world.

== History ==
Bulletin for 1978–1980, when known as the Graduate School of Business

The school was founded in 1916 with 11 full-time faculty members and an inaugural class of 61 students, including 8 women. Banking executive Emerson McMillin provided initial funding in 1916, while A. Barton Hepburn, then president of Chase National Bank, provided funding for the school's endowment in 1919. The school expanded rapidly, enrolling 420 students by 1920, and in 1924 added a PhD program to the existing BS and MS degree programs.

In 1945, Columbia Business School authorized the awarding of the MBA degree. Shortly thereafter, in the 1950s, the school adopted the Hermes emblem as its symbol, reflecting the entrepreneurial nature of the Greek god Hermes and his association with business, commerce, and communication. In 1952, the school admitted its last class of undergraduates.

The school currently offers executive education programs that culminate in a Certificate in Business Excellence (CIBE) and full alumni status, and several degree programs for the MBA and PhD degrees. In addition to the full-time MBA, the school offers four Executive MBA programs: the NY-EMBA Friday/Saturday program, the EMBA-Global program (launched in 2001 in conjunction with the London Business School), the EMBA-Americas program launched in 2012, and the EMBA-Global Asia program (launched in 2009 in conjunction with the London Business School and the University of Hong Kong Business School). Students in jointly run programs earn an MBA degree from each of the cooperating institutions.

In 2004, economist R. Glenn Hubbard became Columbia Business School's eleventh dean. He was succeeded in 2019 by Costis Maglaras.

== Campus ==
From 1961, Columbia Business School was primarily located housed in Uris Hall, at the center of Columbia's Morningside Heights campus.

In October 2010, Columbia Business School announced that alumnus Henry Kravis, the billionaire co-founder of private-equity firm KKR, pledged $100 million to fund an expansion of Columbia Business School, the largest gift in its history. The donation went toward construction of the business school's new site on Columbia's Manhattanville campus. In December 2012, Ronald Perelman also donated $100 million to the construction of the second business school building. In September 2021, David Geffen pledged $75 million to support the new campus' construction. The buildings are designed by Diller Scofidio + Renfro, and are named Henry R. Kravis Hall and David Geffen Hall, respectively. Columbia Business School officially moved to Manhattanville in January 2022.

The cost of the new campus, which stands at $600 million, makes it the most expensive business school ever built.

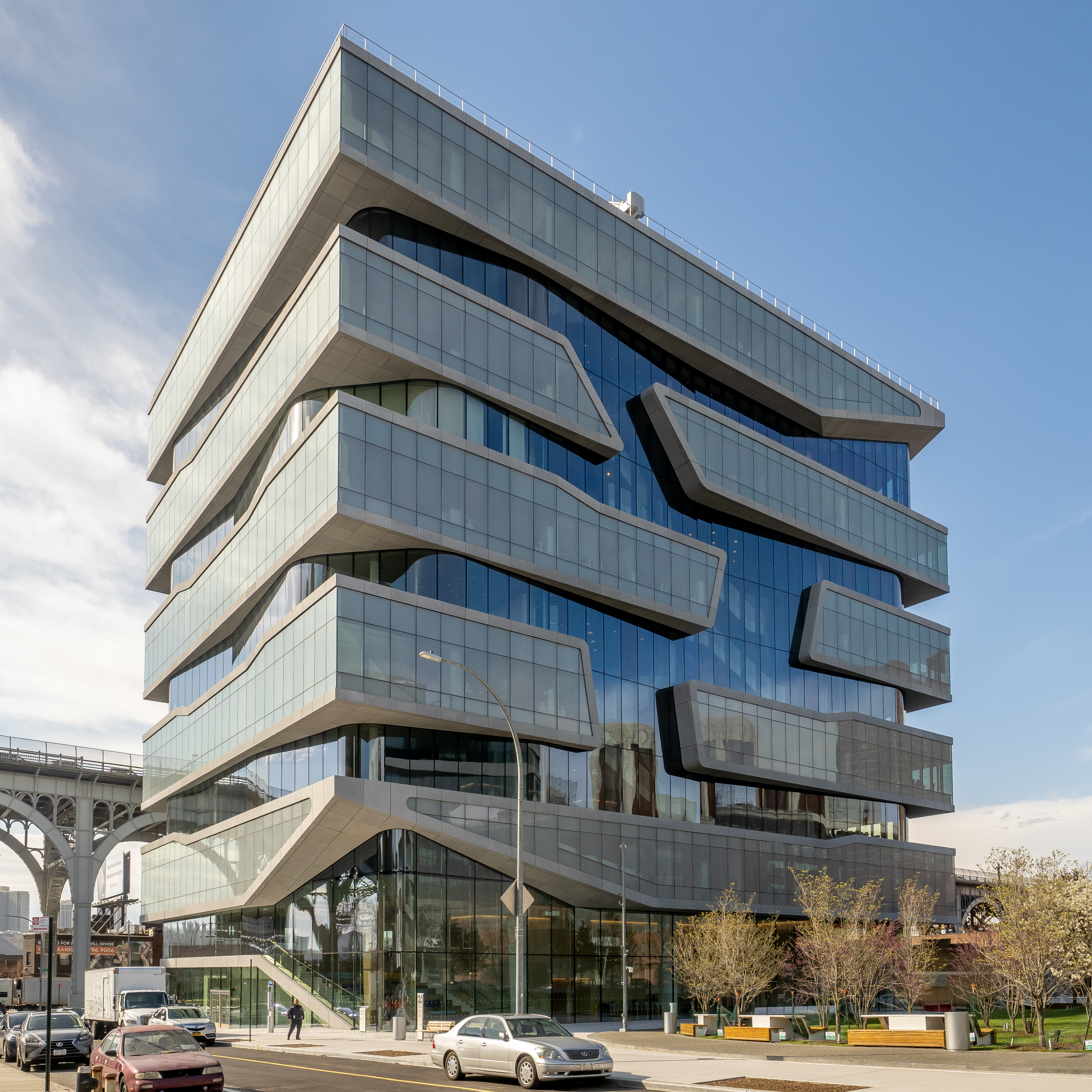
Manhattanville Campus – Kravis Hall

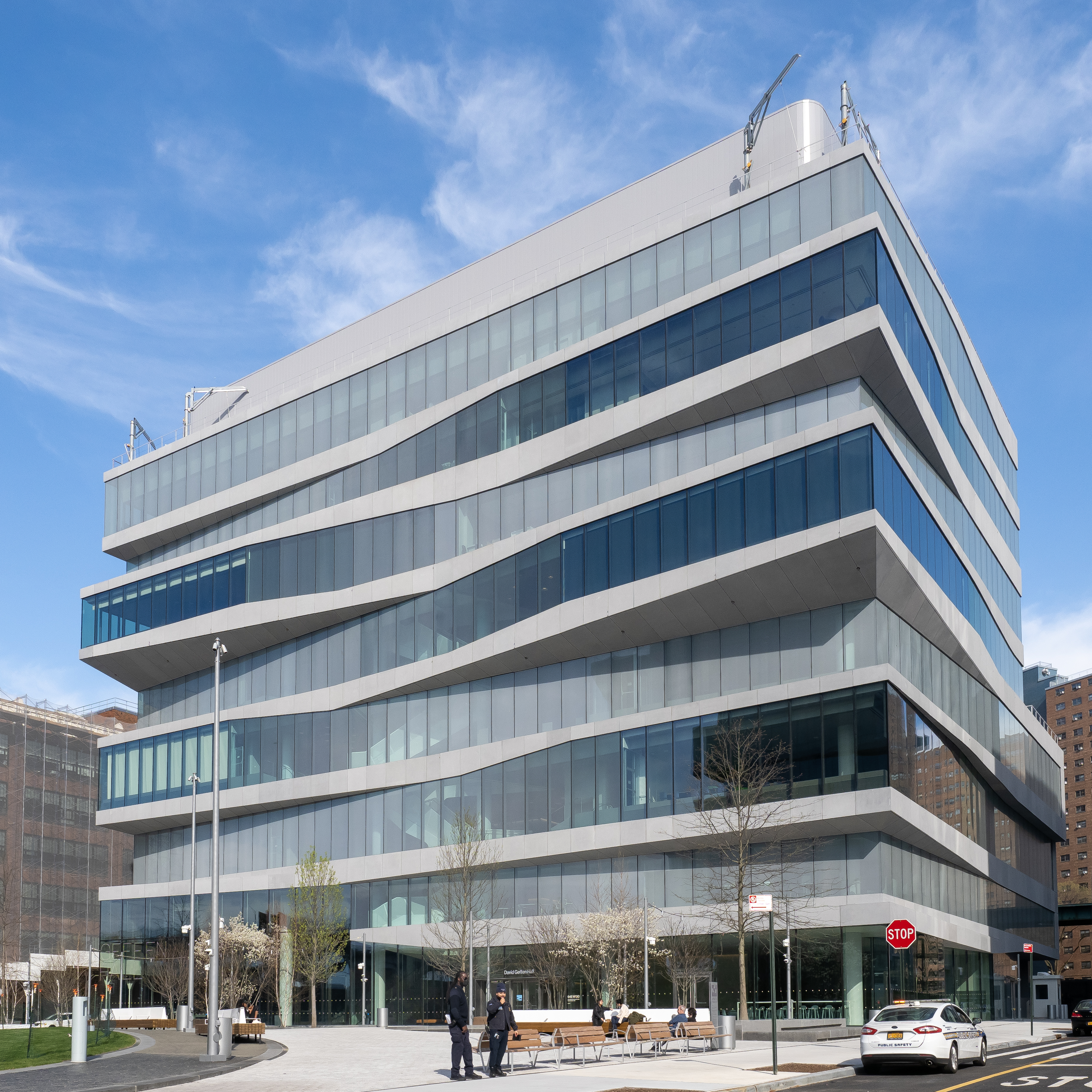
Manhattanville Campus – David Geffen Hall

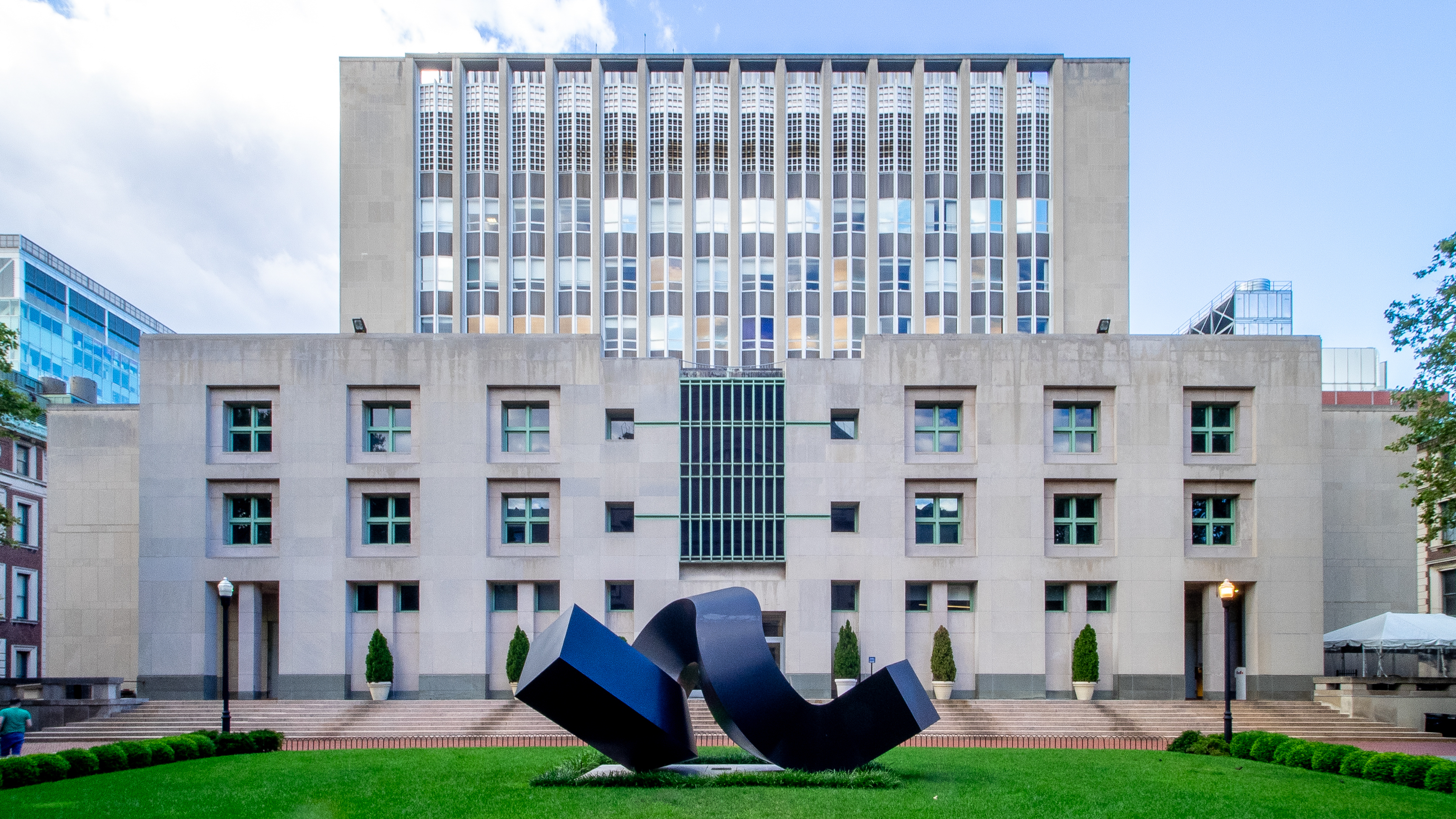
Morningside Heights – Uris Hall (Old Campus)

== MBA program ==
The Columbia MBA Program is one of the most competitive in the world with an admission rate of 13.6% for the Class of 2021. Students in the class that entered in 2009 come from 61 countries and speak more than 50 languages.

The revised core curriculum, launched in the fall of 2008, represents about 40% of the degree requirement. It consists of 2 full courses and 12 half-term courses including Corporate Finance, Financial Accounting, Managerial Statistics, Managerial Economics, Leadership, Operations Management, and Marketing Strategy. While the first year of the program is usually devoted to completing the requirements of the core curriculum, the second year provides students with the opportunity to choose from the more than 130 elective courses available at the school and supplement them with more than 4,000 graduate-level classes from the university's other graduate and professional schools. Among the most popular electives at Columbia Business School are the Economics of Strategic Behavior, Financial Statement Analysis and Earnings Quality, Launching New Ventures, Modern Political Economy, and the Seminar in Value Investing.

Columbia Business School has a firm grade non-disclosure policy, which states that students may refrain from disclosing specific class grades, GPAs, or transcripts until they accept full-time, post graduation positions.

Students enter Columbia's MBA program in two tracks. The traditional fall term is approximately 550 students, while the January term "J-Term" is approximately 200 students. Students entering in the fall are divided into eight clusters of approximately 65 students that take all first year core classes together. J-Term students are broken into three clusters.

The January-entry is similar to the August-entry option. January-entry students attend orientation in the spring, while August-entry students are beginning their second terms, and finish their core courses over the summer, while August-entry students participate in summer internships. In the fall of the second year, the two tracks become one, and all MBA students choose from the same pool of electives, gain access to the same career management resources, lead the same clubs, and graduate as a single class.

The average starting base salary and bonus for Columbia MBAs in 2020 was $171,436, a sum that places it as the 6th highest among business schools. According to Forbes magazine, 90% of billionaires with MBAs who derived their fortunes from finance obtained their master's degree from one of three schools: Harvard Business School, Columbia Business School, or The Wharton School at the University of Pennsylvania.

=== Academic divisions ===
The school's faculty are divided into six academic units:

- Accounting
- Decision, Risk, and Operations
- Finance
- Management
- Economics
- Marketing

=== MBA rankings ===
Business school rankings

United States
- QS MBA: 8
- Financial Times MBA: 2
- Bloomberg MBA: 9
- USNWR MBA: 7
- THE Business: 8

Global
- QS MBA: 14
- Financial Times MBA: 2
- THE Business: 14

Recent national rankings of Columbia's MBA program include 7th by Forbes, 5th by Bloomberg Businessweek, and 6th by U.S. News & World Report. In global rankings, Columbia was ranked No. 4 by The Economist in 2022 and No. 1 by the Financial Times in 2023.

=== Dual-degree programs ===
Columbia Business School students can combine an MBA with one of ten other professional degrees. In general, a dual degree requires one less year than it would take to complete the two degrees separately. Candidates must apply separately to Columbia Business School and the other degree program.

Dual degrees offered with the following schools include:

- School of Architecture, Planning and Preservation
- College of Dental Medicine
- School of Engineering and Applied Science
- School of International and Public Affairs
- School of Journalism
- School of Law
- School of Nursing
- College of Physicians and Surgeons
- School of Public Health
- School of Social Work

=== Student life ===
The Columbia Business School Follies is a student club that works throughout each semester to put together a production in which students write, choreograph, and perform comedy skits. It achieved notoriety in 2006 for "Every Breath Bernanke Takes", its video parody of the Police song "Every Breath You Take". It purports to be from Glenn Hubbard, Dean of the Business School, in response to Hubbard's being a runner-up to the Fed Chairmanship assumed by Ben Bernanke.

== Executive MBA programs ==
Columbia offers various executive MBA programs.

The Executive MBA (EMBA) Friday/Saturday Program is a 20-month graduate program designed for individuals that are looking to enhance their education without interrupting their careers. The EMBA program is taught on campus at Columbia University by full-time faculty. The first year of classes consists of the same core curriculum as the Full-Time MBA program. Executive education is the focus of the second year. This Friday/Saturday program is targeted at individuals with approximately 10 years of work experience.

The Executive MBA (EMBA) Saturday Program is a 24-month graduate degree program designed for individuals that are looking to enhance their education, but cannot take any time away from work. This program is the same as the Friday/Saturday program, with the exception that classes only meet on Saturdays over a longer period of time.

In addition to the New York-based EMBA Program, Columbia offers three partner programs to meet the differing needs and geographical distribution of prospective students. Because students in the partner EMBA programs must satisfy the separate requirements of each school, they earn an MBA degree from each participating university. Likewise, they become alumni of each university and business school and may avail themselves of all programs and privileges afforded to alumni.

- The EMBA-Global Americas & Europe program is a 20-month program administered in partnership with the London Business School. The program enrolls approximately 70 students from around the world per year. Courses are taught by the full-time faculty of both schools. During the first year, the core curriculum classes alternate monthly between the campuses of Columbia University and the London Business School. The core curriculum is similar to that offered in the regular EMBA programs offered separately by each school, but with a more transnational-business emphasis. Second year classes may be selected from the portfolio of EMBA classes offered at either or both partner schools.
- The EMBA-Global Asia, run jointly with the London Business School and the University of Hong Kong. This 20-month program follows a curriculum similar to the EMBA-Global program. Classes are held in Hong Kong, London, New York, and Shanghai.

=== EMBA rankings ===
- No. 2 worldwide, No. 2 US program, BusinessWeek, 2011 Executive MBA Rankings
- No. 2 worldwide, Financial Times, 2010 Executive MBA Rankings, Global-EMBA program
- No. 3 US Program, No. 13 worldwide. Financial Times, 2010 Executive MBA Rankings, Berkeley-Columbia program
- No. 4 US Program, No. 15 worldwide. Financial Times, 2010 Executive MBA Rankings, NY-EMBA program
- No. 5 U.S. News & World Report 2010 Rankings
- No. 4 BusinessWeek Executive MBA Rankings, NY-EMBA program
- No. 9 Wall Street Journal Executive MBA Rankings, 2010, NY-EMBA program

== MS Programs ==
Columbia Business School offers three separate Master of Science degrees in Accounting and Fundamental Analysis, Financial Economics and Marketing Science. Admission to the programs is extremely competitive: in 2021, there were 837 applicants to the Financial Economics program and only 20 students were accepted.

== Doctoral program ==
The degree of Doctor of Philosophy (PhD) is offered by the Graduate School of Arts and Sciences and is administered by the Business School. Admission is highly competitive with 894 applicants in 2010 for positions in an entering class of 18 students (2%). In 2021, the Finance division received over 500 applications and admitted 3 students (Acceptance rate of 0.6%) A PhD in Management or Business is a common precursor to an academic career in business schools.

== Executive education ==
Columbia Business School Executive Education offers custom non-degree programs for organizations and open-enrollment non-degree programs for individuals in topics including management, finance, leadership, marketing, social enterprise, and strategy. The school also offers executive certification programs, including the Advanced Management Program, the Certificate in Business Excellence and the Senior Leaders Program for Nonprofit Professionals.

== CIBE ==
The Certificate in Business Excellence (CIBE) is awarded to students who complete a total of 18 program days of executive education within a four-year period. Any executive education program at Columbia Business School can be applied toward the completion of the certificate.

== Research centers, programs, and institutes ==
Research centers, special programs, institutes, and cross-disciplinary areas at Columbia Business School include:

- Arthur J. Samberg Institute for Teaching Excellence
- The Behavioral Lab
- The Center for Decision Sciences
- Center for Excellence in Accounting and Security Analysis
- Center on Global Brand Leadership
- Center on Japanese Economy and Business
- Columbia Institute for Tele-Information
- Columbia University Center for International Business Education Research
- Competitive Strategy
- Decision Making and Negotiations
- Eugene Lang Center for Entrepreneurship
- Healthcare and Pharmaceutical Management Program
- The Heilbrunn Center for Graham & Dodd Investing
- Jerome A. Chazen Institute of International Business
- The Media Program
- The Paul Milstein Center for Real Estate
- Private Equity Program
- Program for Financial Studies
- Program on Social Intelligence
- Richard Paul Richman Center for Business, Law, and Public Policy
- The Sanford C. Bernstein & Co. Center for Leadership and Ethics
- The Social Enterprise Program
- W. Edwards Deming Center for Quality, Productivity and Competitiveness

== People ==
=== Faculty ===
Columbia Business School employs 136 full-time faculty members, including Joseph Stiglitz, the 2001 Nobel laureate in economics who also teaches at the university's School of International and Public Affairs; and Bernd Schmitt, the Robert D. Calkins Professor of International Business. The current dean is the former presidential Council of Economic Advisers chairman Glenn Hubbard. Hedge fund gurus Joel Greenblatt and Ken Shubin Stein are currently adjunct professors. Bruce Greenwald teaches Value Investing and Economics of Strategic Behavior electives. Adam Dell, brother of Dell Inc. CEO Michael Dell, is a venture capitalist who teaches Business Innovation and Technology. Jonathan Knee teaches Media, Mergers, and Acquisitions and is the author of a book titled "The Accidental Investment Banker". Frederic Mishkin, member of the board of governors of the Federal Reserve System, returned to teach at CBS starting fall 2008. Rita Gunther McGrath is a well known member of the strategy faculty and the author of four books on the subject, most recently The End of Competitive Advantage: How to Keep Your Strategy Moving as Fast As Your Business (2013, Harvard Business Review Publishing) Steve Blank created the Lean Launchpad class that he teaches a scientific method for teaching entrepreneurship that combines experiential learning with the three building blocks of a successful Lean Startup.

=== Alumni ===
Columbia Business School has over 44,000 living alumni. Some of the more notable alumni include the following:

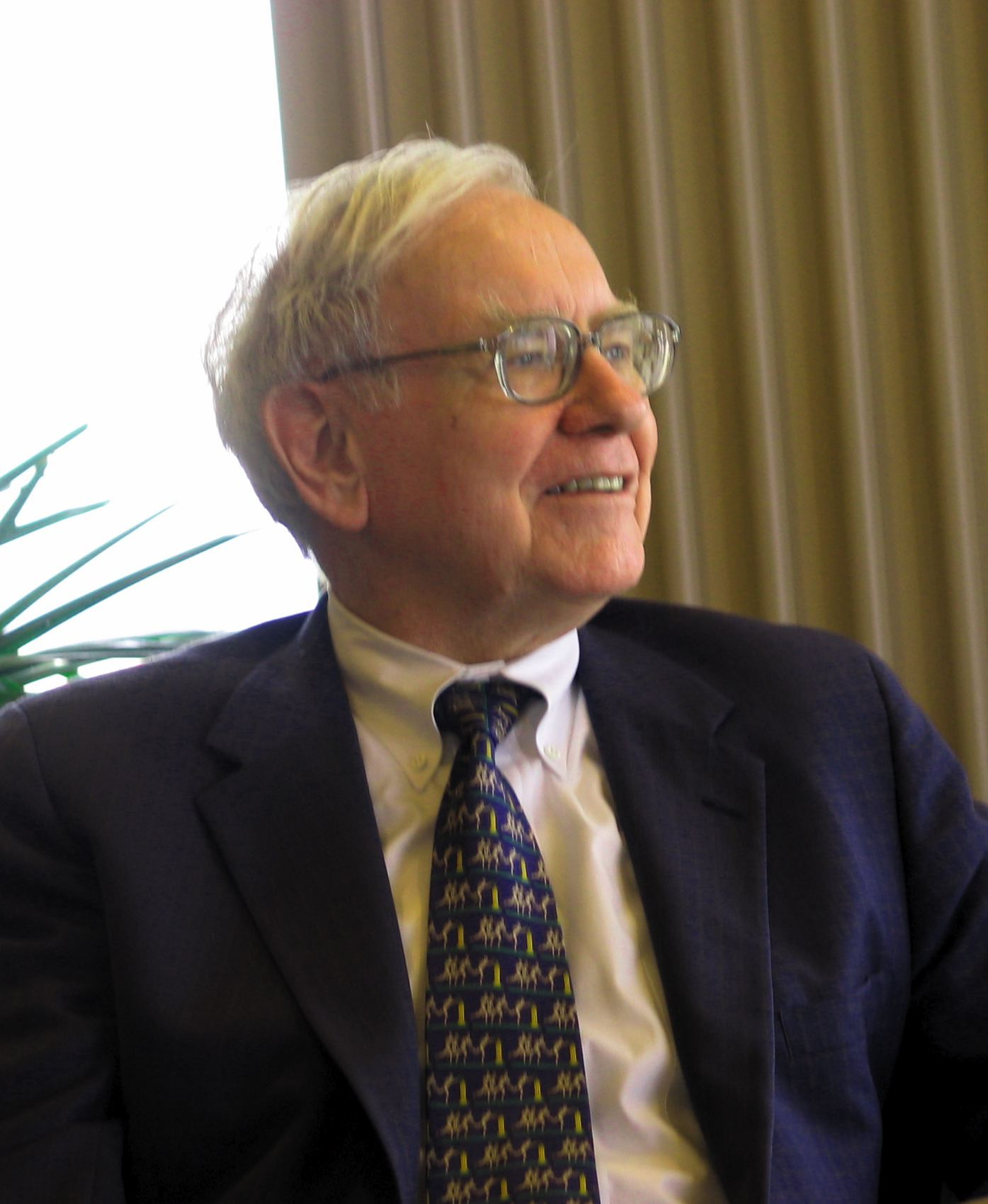
Warren Buffett, CEO of Berkshire Hathaway

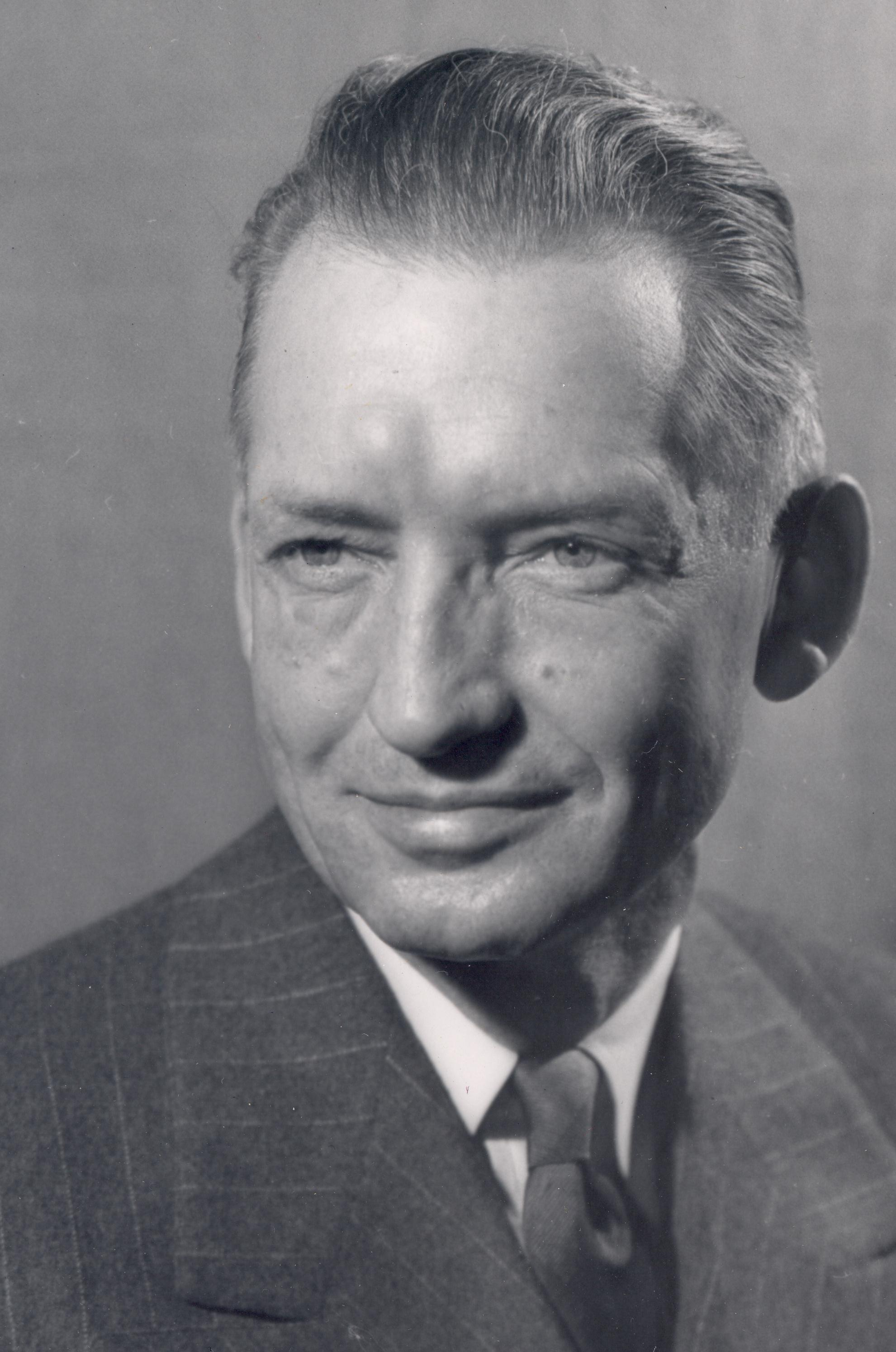
David Dodd, father of value investing

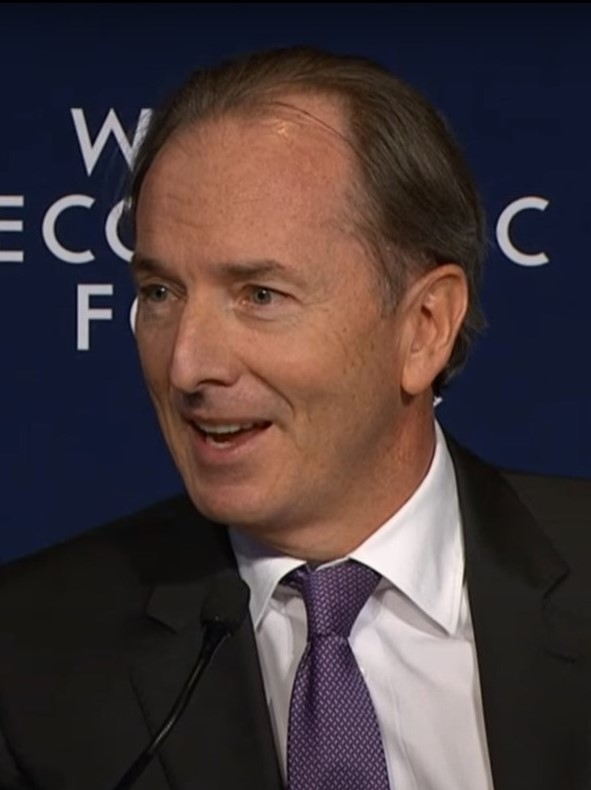
James Gorman, chairman and CEO of Morgan Stanley

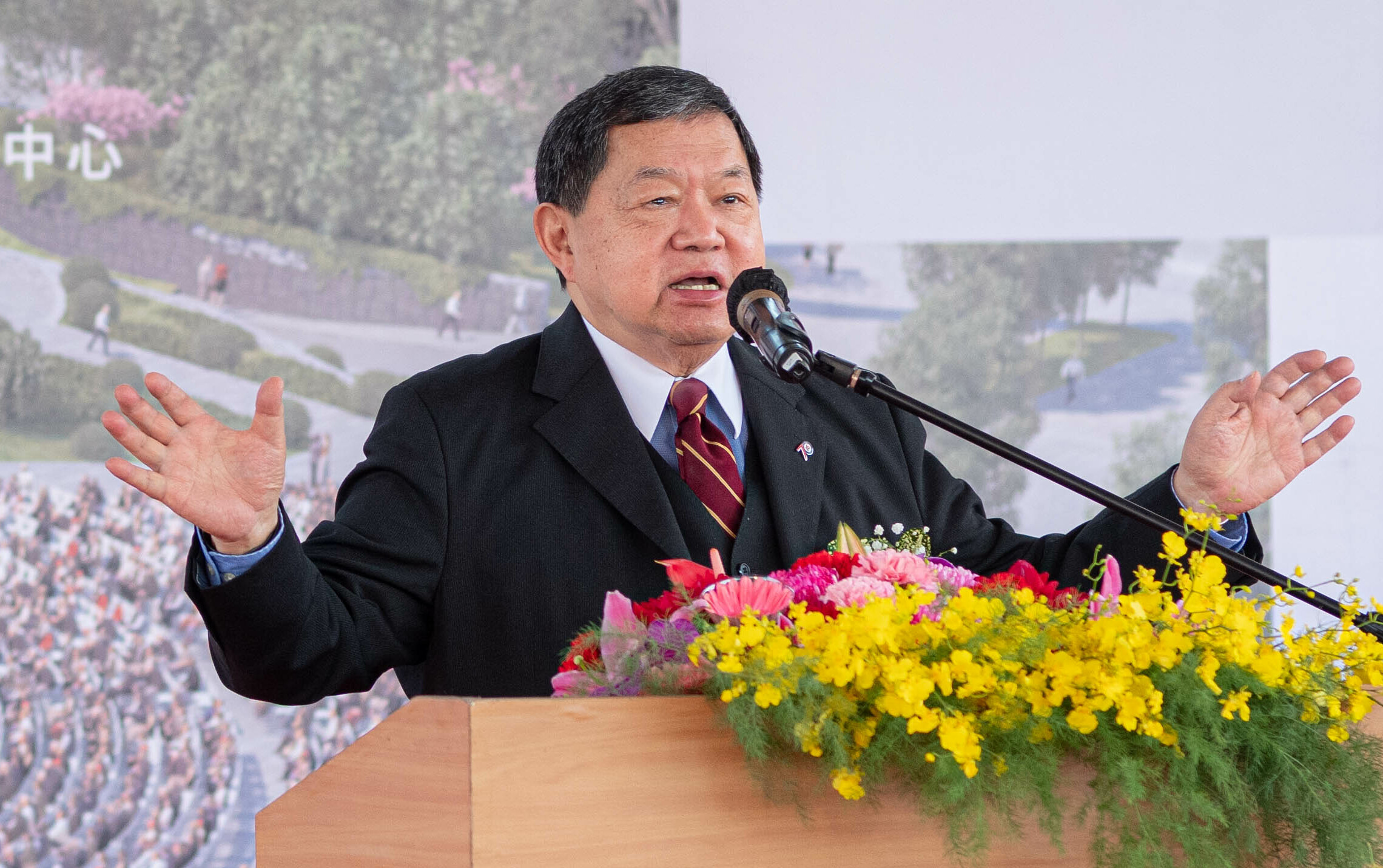
Douglas Hsu, chairman of Far Eastern Group

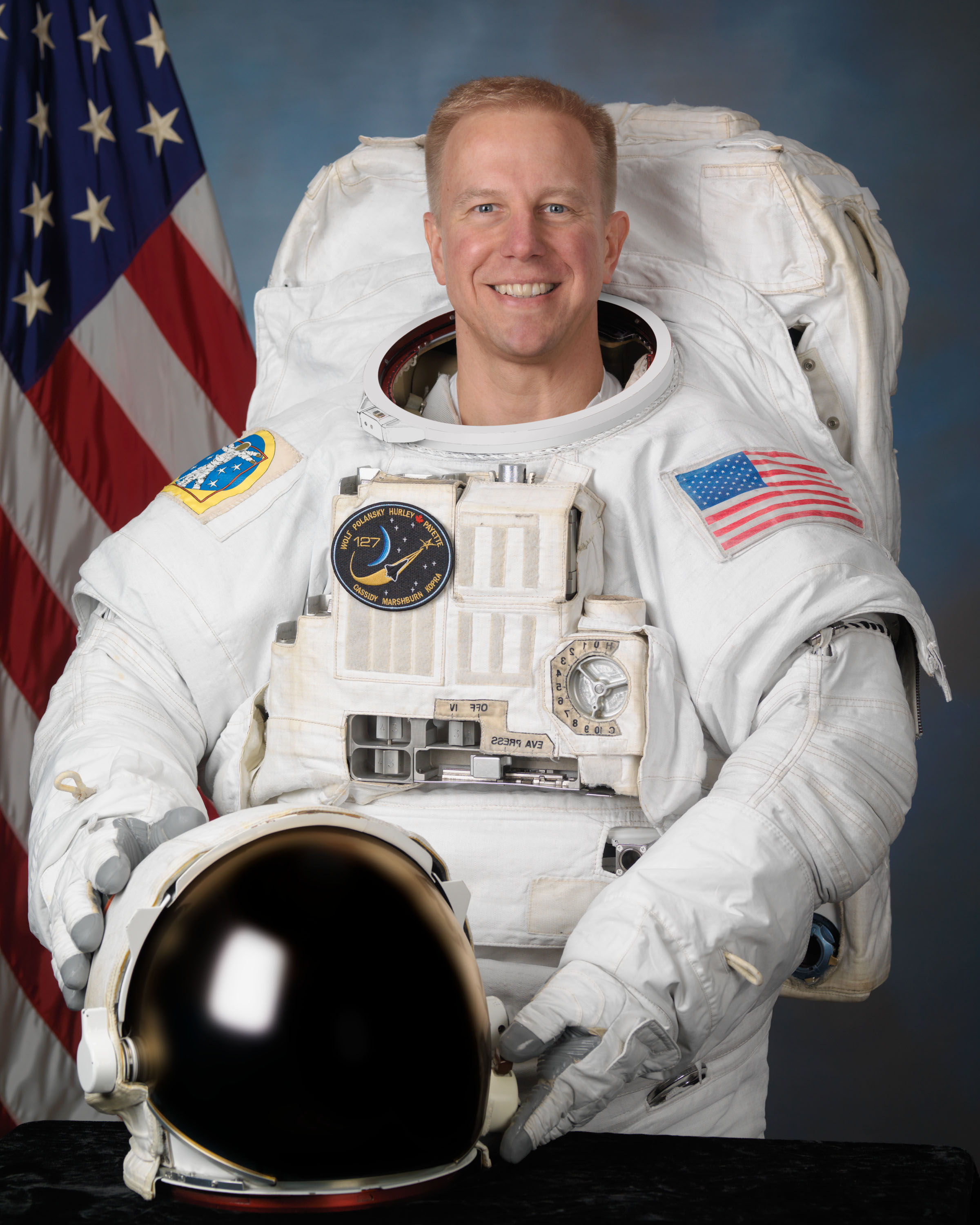
Timothy Kopra, NASA astronaut

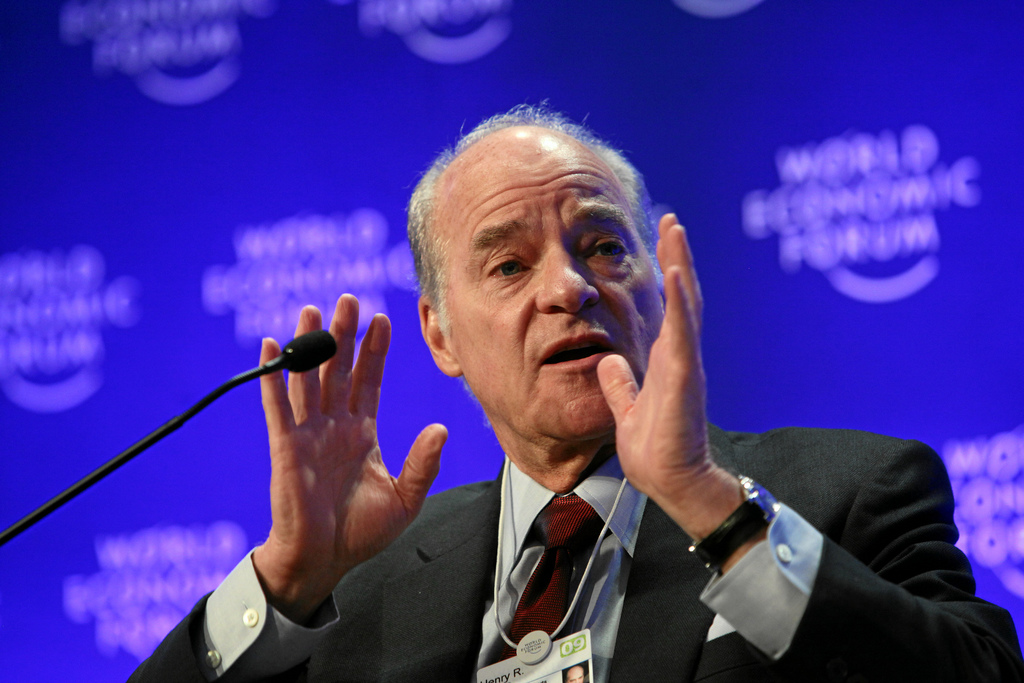
Henry Kravis, founder of Kohlberg Kravis Roberts

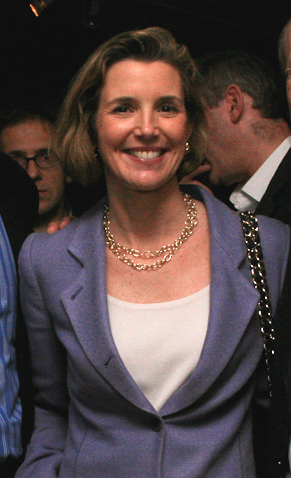
Sallie Krawcheck, CEO and co-founder of Ellevest, former chairman & CEO Sanford Bernstein, former CEO of Citigroup Global Wealth Management

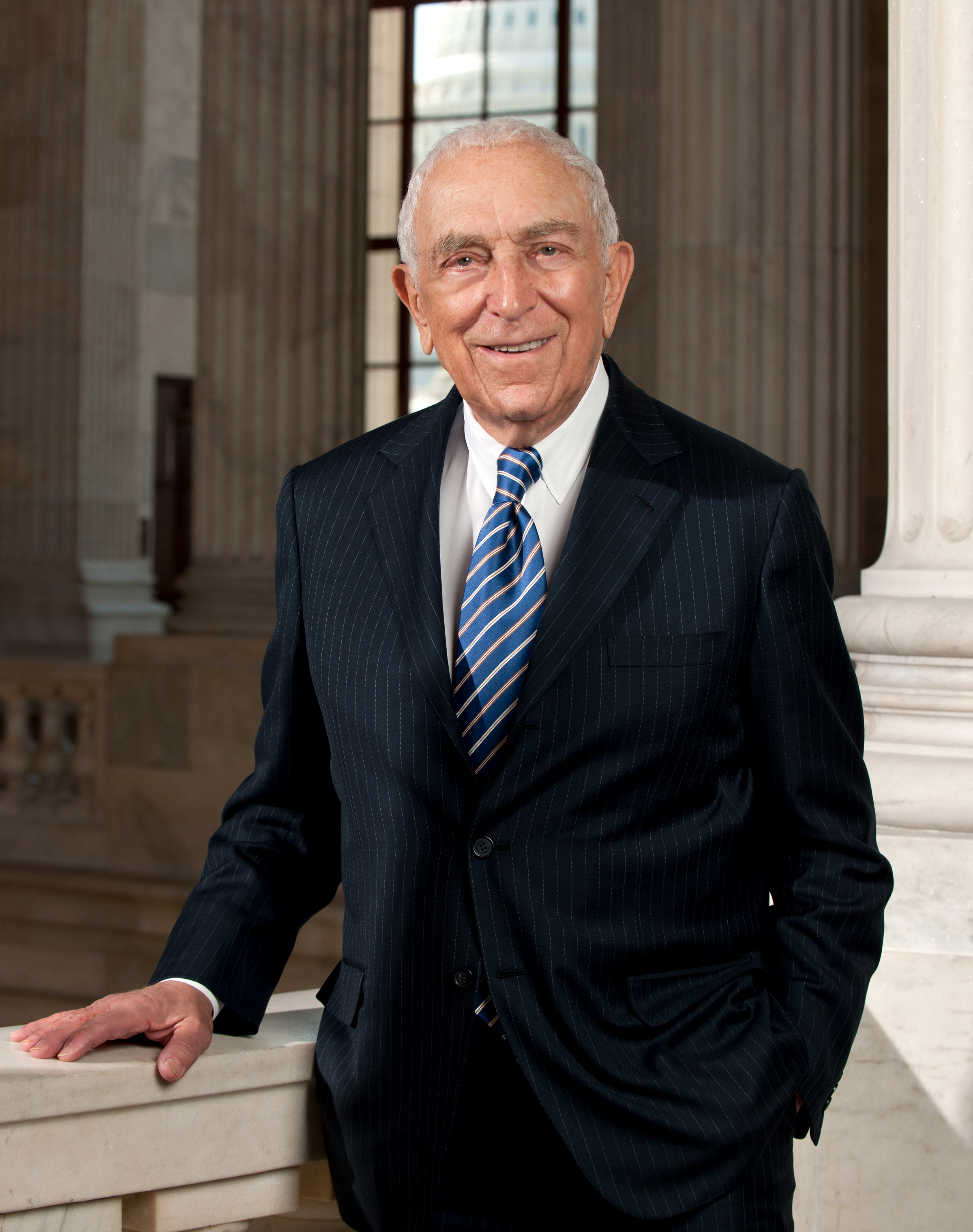
Frank Lautenberg, US Senator

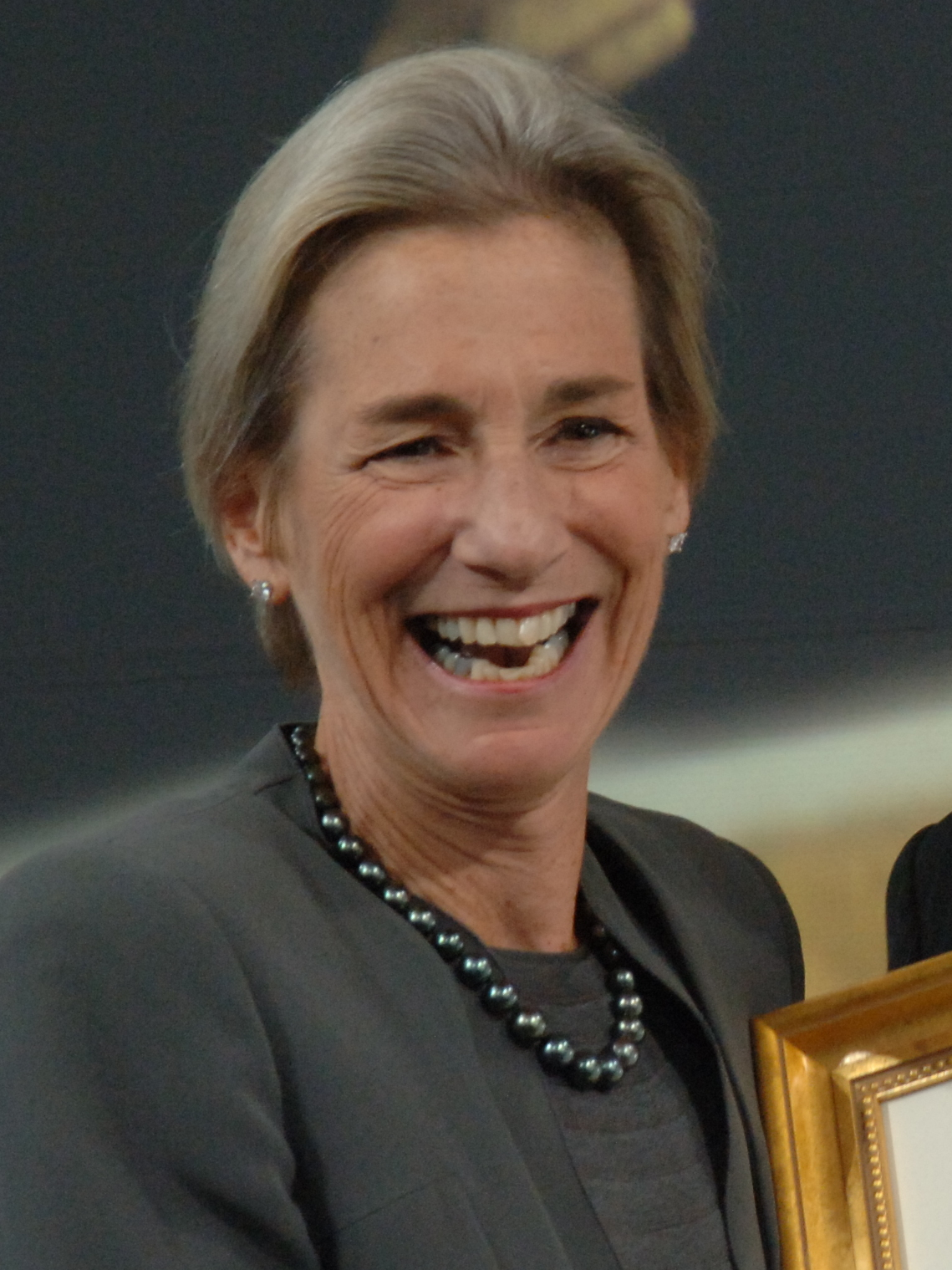
Shelly Lazarus, chairman and CEO of Ogilvy & Mather

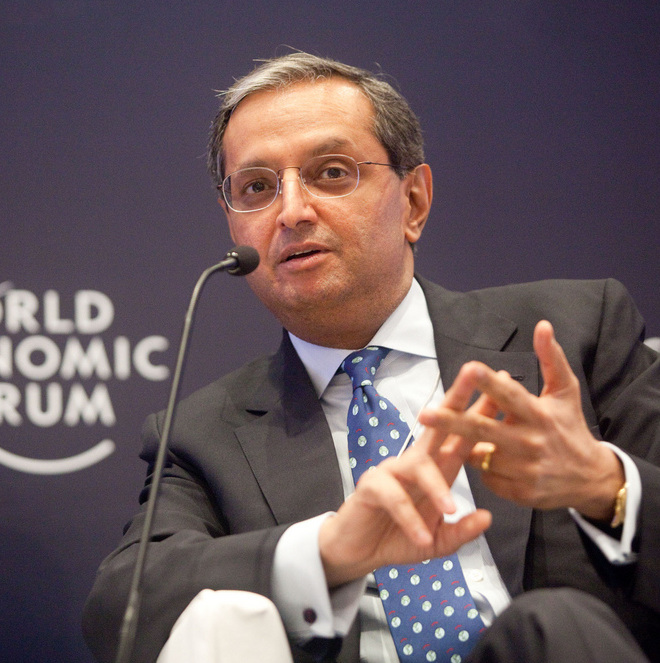
Vikram Pandit, former CEO of Citigroup

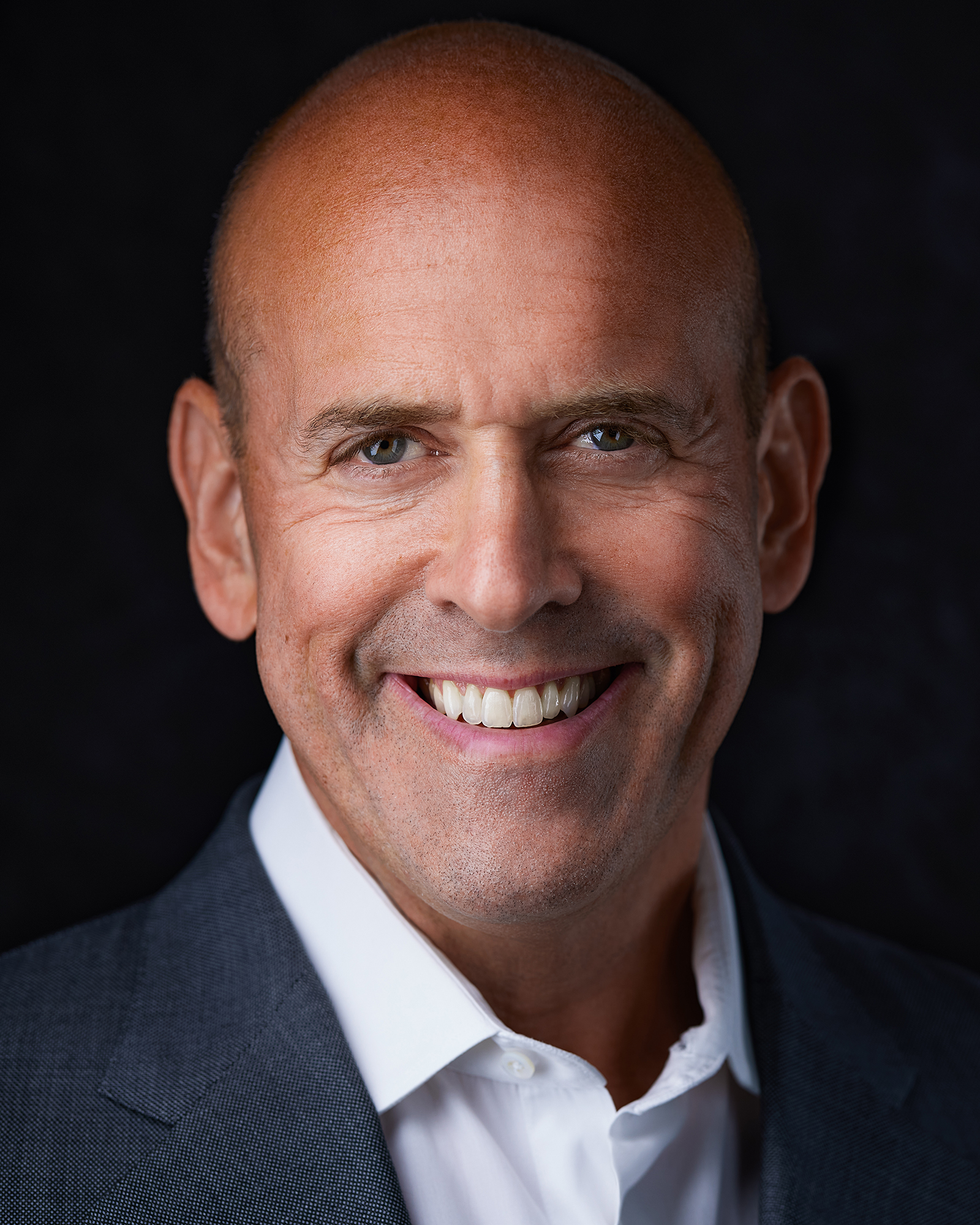
Harvey Schwartz, CEO of The Carlyle Group, former president and COO of Goldman Sachs

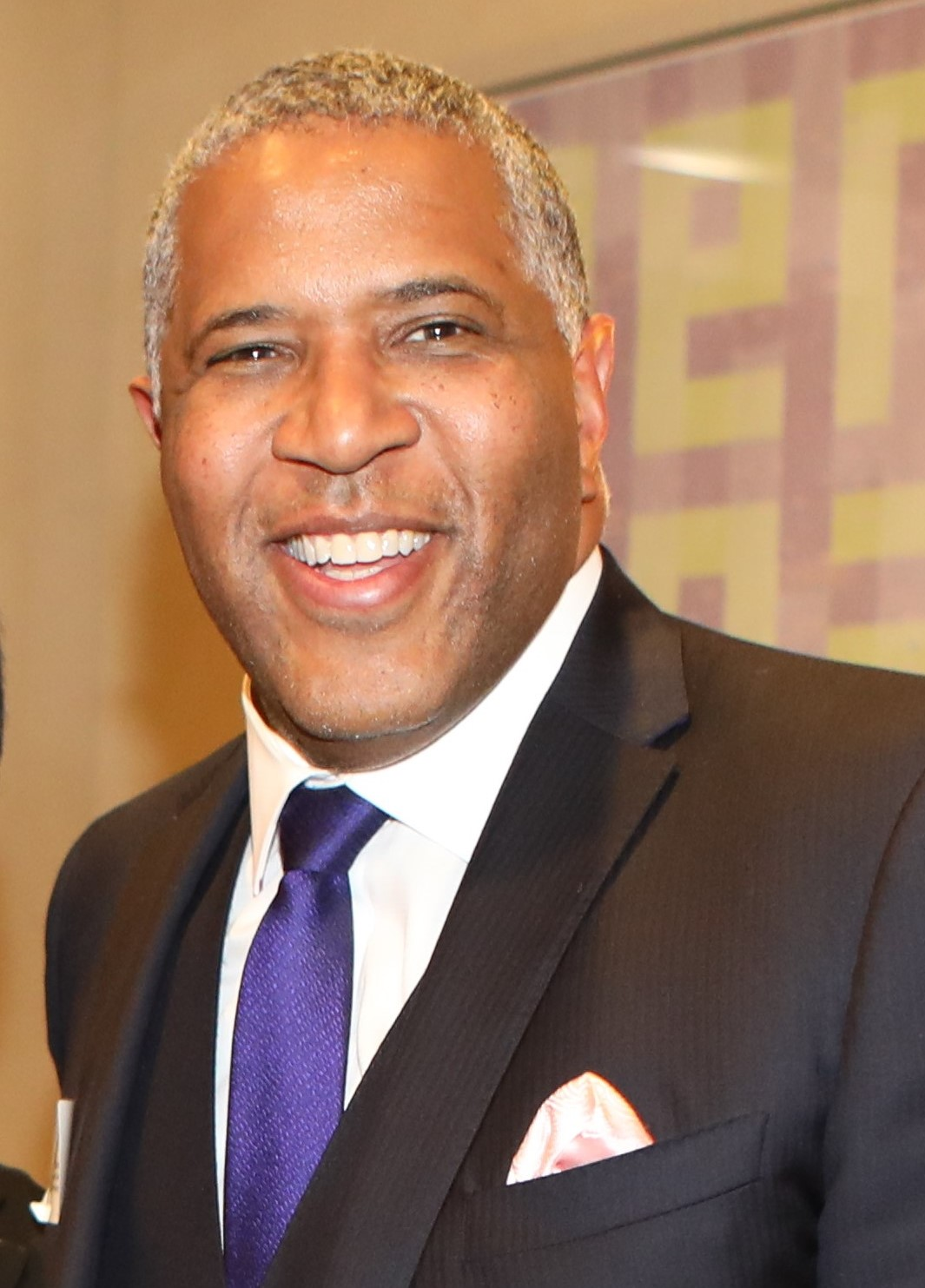
Robert F. Smith, founder of Vista Equity Partners, wealthiest African-American

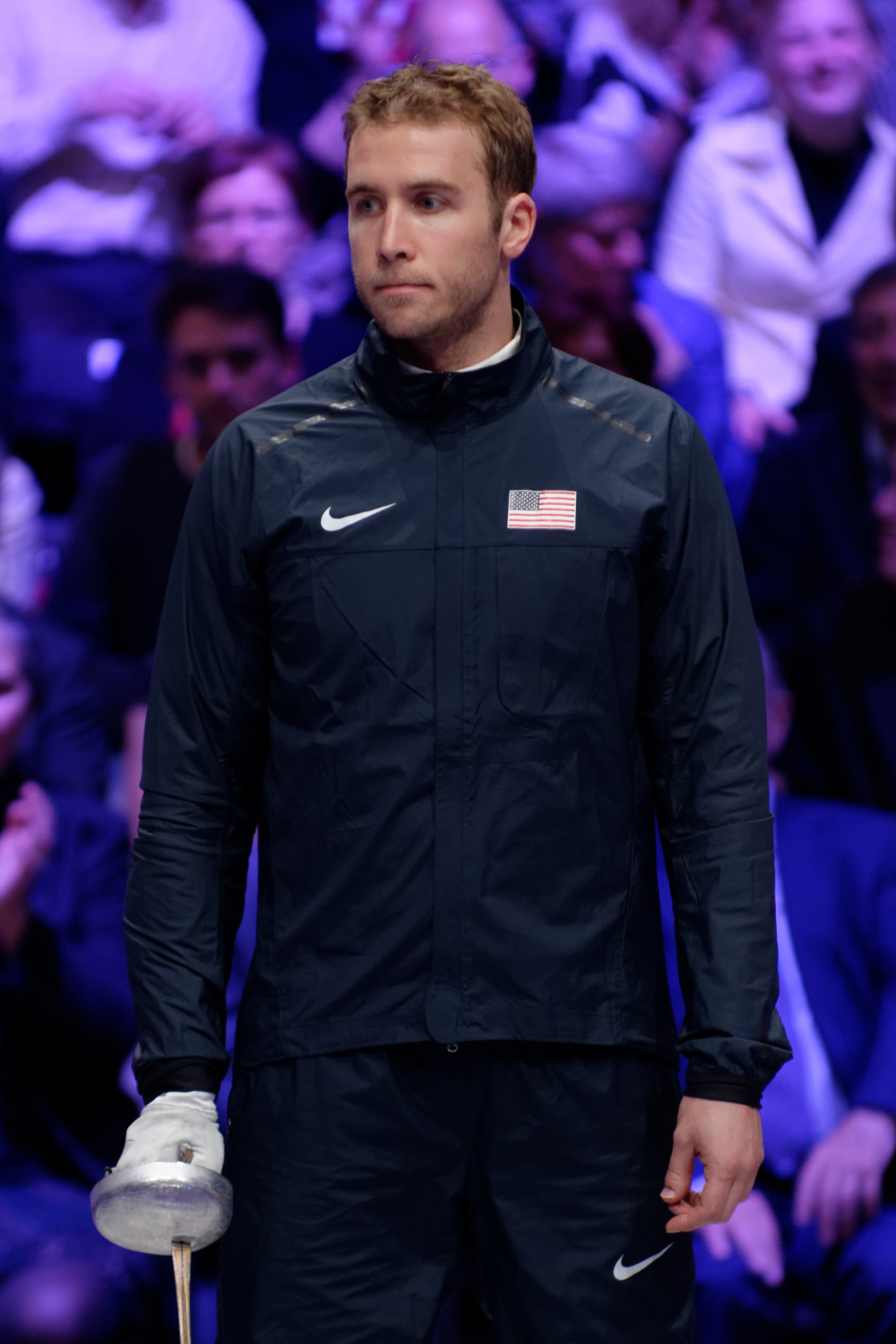
Soren Thompson, world champion and Olympic épée fencer

- Akinlabi Olasunkanmi, MBA, Nigerian Senator and Minister of Youth Development
- Alan Patricof, MBA 1957, founder of Apax Partners
- Alexander Haig, MBA 1955, United States Secretary of State
- Alfred P. Thorne, PhD 1959, British Guiana-born development economist
- Anna Rawson, MBA 2015, Australian professional golfer and model
- Antony Ressler, MBA 1985, co-founder of private equity firm Apollo Global Management and Ares Management
- António Pedro dos Santos Simões, MBA, CEO of Legal & General
- Arthur Burns, PhD 1934, chairman of the Federal Reserve
- Arthur J. Samberg, MBA 1967, chairman and CEO of Pequot Capital
- Artie Minson, MBA 1997, former CEO of WeWork
- Azita Raji, MBA 1991, former United States ambassador to Sweden
- Benjamin M. Rosen, MBA 1961, former chairman and CEO of Compaq
- Benjamin Wey, MSLD 2013, Chinese-born American financier
- Beth Ford, MBA 1995, CEO of Land O'Lakes
- Beverly Leon, MBA 2020, former midfielder for Sunderland A.F.C. Ladies
- Bill Keenan, MBA 2016, former professional hockey player and author
- Blair Effron, MBA 1986, founder of Centerview Partners
- Robert Kasten Jr., MBA 1966, U.S. senator from Wisconsin
- Bob Tufts, MBA 1986, Major League Baseball pitcher
- Charles E. Exley Jr., MBA 1954, former chairman and CEO of NCR Corporation
- Charles R. Perrin, MBA 1969, chairman of Warnaco; former CEO of Duracell and of Avon Products
- Cherie Nursalim, MBA 1990, Indonesian businesswoman, vice chairman of Giti Group
- Christopher O'Neill, MBA 2005, British-American businessman and husband of Princess Madeleine of Sweden
- Claude Arpels, MBA 1998, French-American director of Van Cleef & Arpels
- Cyrus Massoumi, MBA 2003, founder of Zocdoc
- César Alierta, MBA 1970, Spanish CEO of Telefónica
- Daniele Bodini, MBA 1972, Italian-American real estate businessman, Ambassador of San Marino to the United Nations
- David Berger, MBA/Law 1969, American-Israeli Olympic weightlifter, taken hostage and killed by the Palestinian group Black September in the Munich massacre at the 1972 Olympics
- David C. Schmittlein, PhD 1980, Dean of MIT (Sloan)
- David LeFevre Dodd, MS 1921, PhD 1930, father of value investing
- David Philbrick Conner, MBA 1976, CEO of Oversea-Chinese Banking Corporation
- David S. Rose, MBA 1983, entrepreneur, founder of New York Angels
- David Sainsbury, MBA 1971, British former chairman of Sainsbury's
- David E. Simon, MBA 1985, chairman and CEO of Simon Property Group
- Diana Taylor, MBA 1980, 42nd Superintendent of the New York State Banking Department; domestic partner of former mayor Michael Bloomberg
- Donna Rosato, MBA 2000, journalist, reporter for Money Magazine
- Donald S. Siegel, PhD 1988, professor at Arizona State University
- Édouard Carmignac, MBA 1972, French investment banker and fund manager
- Eduardo Verano De la Rosa, MBA 1978, Colombian Governor of Atlántico
- Emilio Lozoya, MBA 1972, Secretary of Energy of Mexico; father of Pemex CEO Emilio Lozoya Austin
- Eric Fromm (born 1958), tennis player
- Ernest Higa, MBA 1976, Japanese-American entrepreneur
- Erskine Bowles, MBA 1969, former White House Chief of Staff; President of the University of North Carolina system
- Ethan Brown, MBA 2008, founder of Beyond Meat
- Eudora Welty, MBA 1932, author, winner of 1973 Pulitzer Prize; recipient of the Presidential Medal of Freedom
- Eugene Lang, MS 1940, chairman of the Eugene M. Lang Foundation
- Federico Marchetti, MBA 1999, Italian founder of online retailer YOOX Group
- Frank Lautenberg, BS 1949, U.S. senator from New Jersey
- Fred Hochberg, MBA 1975, chairman and President of the Export–Import Bank of the United States
- Fritz Klein, MBA 1955, Austrian-born American psychiatrist and sex researcher
- Gabriele Galateri di Genola, MBA 1972, chairman of Assicurazioni Generali, former chairman of Telecom Italia and CEO of Fiat
- Gail J. McGovern, EMBA 1987, CEO of the American Red Cross
- Gen Fukunaga, MBA 1989, Japanese-born American founder and CEO of Funimation Entertainment
- Gerri Willis, MBA, journalist for Fox Business Network
- Gregory Blotnick, MBA 2014, hedge fund manager and author
- Hanzade Doğan Boyner, MBA 1999, Turkish vice-chairwoman of Doğan Holding and daughter of billionaire Aydın Doğan
- Harvey Schwartz, MBA 1996, CEO of The Carlyle Group, former president and COO of Goldman Sachs
- Henry Kravis, MBA 1969, founder of Kohlberg Kravis Roberts & Co.
- Henry Swieca, MBA 1982, co-founder of Highbridge Capital Management, founder of Talpion
- Howard L. Clark Jr., MBA 1968, chairman and CEO of Shearson Lehman Brothers
- Ian Plenderleith, MBA 1971, former Deputy Governor, South African Reserve Bank
- Ira Trivedi, MBA 2008, Indian novelist, yoga teacher, and entrepreneur
- Irvine Laidlaw, Baron Laidlaw, MBA 1965, Scottish businessman and member of the House of Lords
- Irving Kahn, MBA, formerly oldest living active investment professional
- J.T. Battenberg, CEO of Delphi Automotive Systems
- Jay W. Jordan II, MBA, founder of the Jordan Company
- James P. Gorman, MBA 1987, Australian-American chairman and CEO of Morgan Stanley
- James W. Keyes, MBA 1980, CEO of Fresh & Easy and former chairman and CEO of Blockbuster Inc., 7-Eleven
- James Satloff, MBA 1986, former CEO of C.E. Unterberg, Towbin, founder of Liberty Skis
- Jamie Kern, MBA 2004, co-founder and CEO of It Cosmetics
- Jean-Marc Perraud, MBA 1972, French former CFO of Schlumberger
- Jean-Paul Elkann, BS 1943, French director of Dior, son-in-law of Fiat Chairman Gianni Agnelli
- Jeff Campbell, MBA 1967, former chairman and CEO of Burger King
- Jeffrey Loria, MBA 1968, owner of the Florida Marlins
- Jerome Chazen, MBA 1950, co-founder of Liz Claiborne
- Jerome J. Workman Jr., CSEP 2004, CIED 2004, CIBE 2006, author, inventor, and editor of scientific reference works on spectroscopy
- Jerry Speyer, MBA 1964, CEO of Tishman Speyer Properties
- Jill Furman, MBA 1997, co-producer of musical Hamilton
- Joan Hornig, MBA 1983, jewelry designer
- Joern Meissner, PhD 2005, German professor at Kühne Logistics University
- John T. Dillon, MBA 1971, chairman and CEO of International Paper
- John H. Shen-Sampas, MBA 2013, literary executor for the estate of Jack Kerouac
- Jon Stein, MBA 2009, founder and CEO of Betterment
- Jon Steinberg, MBA 2003, President of BuzzFeed
- Jordan Roth, MBA 2010, president and majority owner of Jujamcyn Theaters
- Joseph M. Tucci, MBA 1984, President and CEO of EMC Corporation
- Joseph Vittoria, MBA 1959, former chairman and CEO of Avis
- Joshua Mitts, PhD 2018, Columbia Law School professor known for research into activist short-selling
- Joyce M. Roche, MBA 1972, former CEO of Girls, Inc. and director of AT&T
- Julian Geiger, MBA, former chairman and CEO of Aeropostal
- Kate Wang, MBA 2013, Chinese billionaire businesswoman
- Keiko Sofia Fujimori, MBA 2008, Peruvian politician
- Keith Sherin, EMBA 1991, chairman and CEO of GE Capital
- Kenneth Ouriel, MBA 2009, former CEO of Shaikh Khalifa Medical City in Abu Dhabi; vascular surgeon
- Kevin Burke, MBA, chairman and CEO of Consolidated Edison
- Klaus Enrique, MBA, sculptor
- Koos Bekker, MBA 1984, chairman of Naspers
- Leon G. Cooperman, MBA 1967, founder, chairman, and CEO of Omega Advisors
- Leonard Lauder, MBA 1955, chairman emeritus of the Estée Lauder Companies; son of Estée Lauder
- Lewis A. Sanders, MBA 1995, former chairman and CEO of AllianceBernstein
- Lewis Frankfort, MBA 1969, chairman and CEO of Coach
- Li Lu, MBA 1996, Chinese-American investment banker, fund manager, and investor; one of the student leaders of the 1989 Tiananmen Square student protests
- Lionel Pincus, MBA 1956, founder and chairman of Warburg Pincus
- Lorne Abony, MBA 2003, Canadian owner of the Austin Aces; former CEO of Mood Media
- Louis Bacon, MBA 1981, chairman of Moore Capital Management
- Louis Rossetto, MBA 1973, founder and editor-in-chief of Wired Magazine
- Lynn Yamada Davis, MBA, American celebrity chef and TikToker
- Lynn Tilton, MBA 1987, businesswoman; collateralized loan obligation creator
- Mark T. Cox IV, MBA 1971, former US alternate executive director to the World Bank
- Mario Gabelli, MBA 1967, chairman and CEO of GAMCO Investors
- Mark Gallogly, MBA 1986, founder of Centerbridge Partners
- Mark Mays, MBA 1989, President and CEO of Clear Channel Communications
- Mark Reckless, MBA 1999, UK Independence Party politician; member of parliament for Rochester and Strood
- Martin Kihn, MBA 2001, writer and digital marketer
- Martín Varsavsky, MBA 1985, Argentine/Spanish serial entrepreneur, founder of Jazztel and Fon
- Matt Pincus, MBA 2002, founder and CEO of Songs Music Publishing, son of Lionel Pincus
- Mauricio García Araujo, MBA, president of the Central Bank of Venezuela
- Max C. Chapman, MBA, former president and CEO of Kidder, Peabody & Co.
- Mehmet Omer Koç, MBA 1989, Turkish chairman of Koç Holding
- Meir Amit, MBA, Israeli Chief Director and the head of global operations for Mossad
- Mel Immergut, MBA, former chairman of international law firm Milbank, Tweed, Hadley & McCloy
- Meyer Feldberg, MBA 1965, president of the Illinois Institute of Technology and dean of Columbia Business School
- Michael A. Peel, MBA 1983, former VP of Human Resources at Yale University
- Michael Bellavia, MBA 1999, CEO of Animax Entertainment
- Michael Goodkin, MBA 1968, Quantitative finance entrepreneur, founder of Numerix
- Michael Gould, MBA 1968, chairman and CEO of Bloomingdale's
- Michael E. Hansen, MBA 1989, CEO of Cengage
- Mike Fries, MBA, CEO, vice-chairman of Liberty Global
- Mike Jeffries, MBA 1968, CEO of Abercrombie and Fitch
- Mitch Albom, MBA 1983, author, journalist, screenwriter, Tuesdays with Morrie, The Five People You Meet in Heaven
- N. Robert Hammer, MBA, chairman and CEO of CommVault Systems
- Nancy McKinstry, MB 1984, CEO and chairman of the executive board of Wolters Kluwer
- Noor Pahlavi, MBA 2020, model, socialite and princess to the former throne of Iran
- Patrick Stokes, MBA 1966, former chairman and CEO of Anheuser-Busch
- Paul B. Kazarian, MBA 1981, founder, chairman, and CEO of Japonica Partners
- Paul Calello, MBA 1987, chairman and CEO of Credit Suisse's investment banking division
- Paul Montrone, PhD 1996, chairman and CEO of Fisher Scientific
- Penny Chenery, MBA, sportswoman who bred and raced Secretariat, 1973 winner of the Triple Crown
- Percy Uris, BS 1920, real estate developer and namesake of Uris Hall, the business school building of Columbia
- Peter A. Cohen, MBA 1969, chairman and CEO of Shearson Lehman Brothers
- Peter Woo, MBA 1972, chairman of Wheelock & Co and The Wharf Holdings Limited
- Philip Geier, MBA 1958, former chairman and CEO of Interpublic Group of Companies
- Philip J. K. James, MBA 2005, founding CEO of Lot18 and Snooth
- Philippe Jabre, MBA 1982, CEO of Jabre Capital Partners
- Prince Amedeo of Belgium, Archduke of Austria-Este, MBA 2014, member of the Belgian royal family
- Rachel Jacobs, MBA 2002, CEO of ApprenNet killed in the 2015 Philadelphia train derailment
- Robert Agostinelli, MBA 1981, Italian-American founder of Rhône Group
- Robert Amen, MBA 1973, chairman and CEO of International Flavors and Fragrances
- Robert Bakish, MBA 1989, President and CEO of Viacom
- Robert Daniel, MBA, U.S. Congressman from Virginia
- Robert F. Smith, MBA 1994, founder of Vista Equity Partners, wealthiest African-American
- Robert J. Stevens, MBA 1987, chairman and CEO of Lockheed Martin
- Robert K. Watson, MBA 2006, founder of LEED
- Robert R. Bennett, MBA 1982, CEO of Liberty Media Corporation
- Robert Reffkin, MBA 2003, founder and CEO of Compass, Inc.
- Rocco B. Commisso, MBA 1975, chairman and CEO of Mediacom
- Rochelle Lazarus, MBA 1970, chairman and CEO of Ogilvy & Mather
- Rohit Aggarwala, MBA 2000, commissioner of the New York City Department of Environmental Protection
- Ronald Grant, MBA 1993, former president and COO of AOL LLC
- Roy Den Hollander, MBA 1997, lawyer and murder suspect
- Russell Carson, MBA 1967, founder of Welsh, Carson, Anderson & Stowe
- Sallie Krawcheck, MBA 1992, CEO and co-founder, Ellevest, former chairman and CEO Sanford Bernstein and CEO Citigroup Global Wealth Management
- Sanford Greenberg, MBA 1966, chairman of Johns Hopkins University's Wilmer Eye Institute
- Seungpil Yu, MBA 1971, PhD 1979, chairman and CEO of Yuyu Pharma (South Korea)
- Shin Dong-bin (Akio Shigemitsu), MBA 1980, Korean-Japanese billionaire chairman of Lotte Group
- Shirley Wang, MBA 1993, CEO of Plastpro, Inc., daughter-in-law of Wang Yung-ching
- Sidney Taurel, MBA 1971, chairman and CEO of Eli Lilly and Company
- Soren Thompson, MBA 2016, world champion and Olympic épée fencer
- Stephanie Korey, MBA, founder and CEO of Away (luggage)
- Stephen Lash, MBA, chairman of Christie's North America
- Thomas Sandell, MBA 1989, Swedish billionaire hedge fund manager
- Timothy Kopra, MBA 2013, NASA astronaut
- Todd Combs, MBA 2002, hedge fund manager, potential successor of Warren Buffett as CIO of Berkshire Hathaway
- Tos Chirathivat, MBA 1988, CEO of Central Group
- Tracey Chang, MBA 2011, China Central Television anchor; Miss New York USA in 2009
- Tshilidzi Marwala, AMP 2017, Vice-Chancellor and Principal of the University of Johannesburg
- Umayya Toukan, PhD 1987, Governor of the Central Bank of Jordan
- Valerie Mars, MBA, billionaire heiress, daughter of Forrest Mars Jr.
- Vikram Pandit, MBA 1980, PhD 1986, Indian-American CEO of Citigroup
- Vincent Sardi Jr., BS 1937, owner of Sardi's Restaurant
- Walter E. Hussman Jr., MBA 1970, CEO of WEHCO Media and publisher of the Arkansas Democrat-Gazette
- Warren Buffett, MS 1951, CEO of Berkshire Hathaway
- Washington SyCip, MBA 1943, founder of the Asian Institute of Management and Sycip Gorres Velayo & Co.
- Wolfgang Bernhard, MBA 1988, Member of the Board of Management of Daimler AG
- Xavier R. Rolet, MBA 1984, French former CEO of the London Stock Exchange
- Yuzaburo Mogi, MBA 1961, Japanese chairman and CEO of Kikkoman
