= Satloff =

Satloff is a surname. Notable people with the surname include:

- Dustin Satloff (born 1993), American entrepreneur, son of James
- James Satloff (born 1962), American businessman
- Robert Satloff (born 1962), American foreign policy author
