= Howard Clark =

Howard Clark may refer to:

- Howard Clark (bishop) (1903–1983), primate of the Anglican Church of Canada
- Howard Franklin Clark (1914–1942), U.S. Navy pilot, twice awarded Distinguished Flying Cross
  - USS Howard F. Clark
- Howard L. Clark Sr. (1916–2001), CEO of American Express
- Howard Charles Clark (born 1929), Canadian academic
- Howard L. Clark Jr. (died 2020), chairman and CEO of Shearson Lehman Brothers
- Howard Clark (golfer) (born 1954), European Tour and Ryder Cup golfer
- Howard Clark (footballer) (born 1968), English footballer
- Howard Clark (American football) (born 1935), American football player
- Howard Clark (pacifist) (1950–2013), English pacifist, chair of War Resisters' International
- Howie Clark (born 1974), baseball player

== See also ==
- Howard Clark Kee, professor of biblical studies emeritus at Boston University
- Howard Clarke (born 1929), professor emeritus of classics at the University of California, Santa Barbara
- John Howard Clark (1830–1878), Australian newspaper editor
