= Immergut =

Immergut is a German surname, which means 'Always Well'. Notable people with the surname include:

- Ellen M. Immergut, political scientist
- Karin Immergut (born 1960), American judge
- Mel Immergut, American lawyer

== See also ==
- Immergut Festival
