= Charles R. Perrin =

American businessman

Charles R. Perrin is the Chairman of Warnaco. He previously served as the chairman and CEO of Avon Products and the chairman and CEO of Duracell.

== Early life and career ==
Perrin obtained an BA from Trinity College, Hartford in 1967 and an MBA from Columbia Business School. Perrin began his career with General Foods and later worked at Chesebrough-Ponds. He served as the CEO of Duracell from 1994 to 1996, resigning from the company upon its acquisition by The Gillette Company. He joined Avon in 1998 as Vice Chairman and COO and eventually served as CEO of Avon from 1998 to 1999. He currently serves as the Chairman of Warnaco, a position he has held since 2004. He also sits on the board of directors for Abercrombie and Fitch (ANF).
