= David Schmittlein =

American academic (1955–2025)

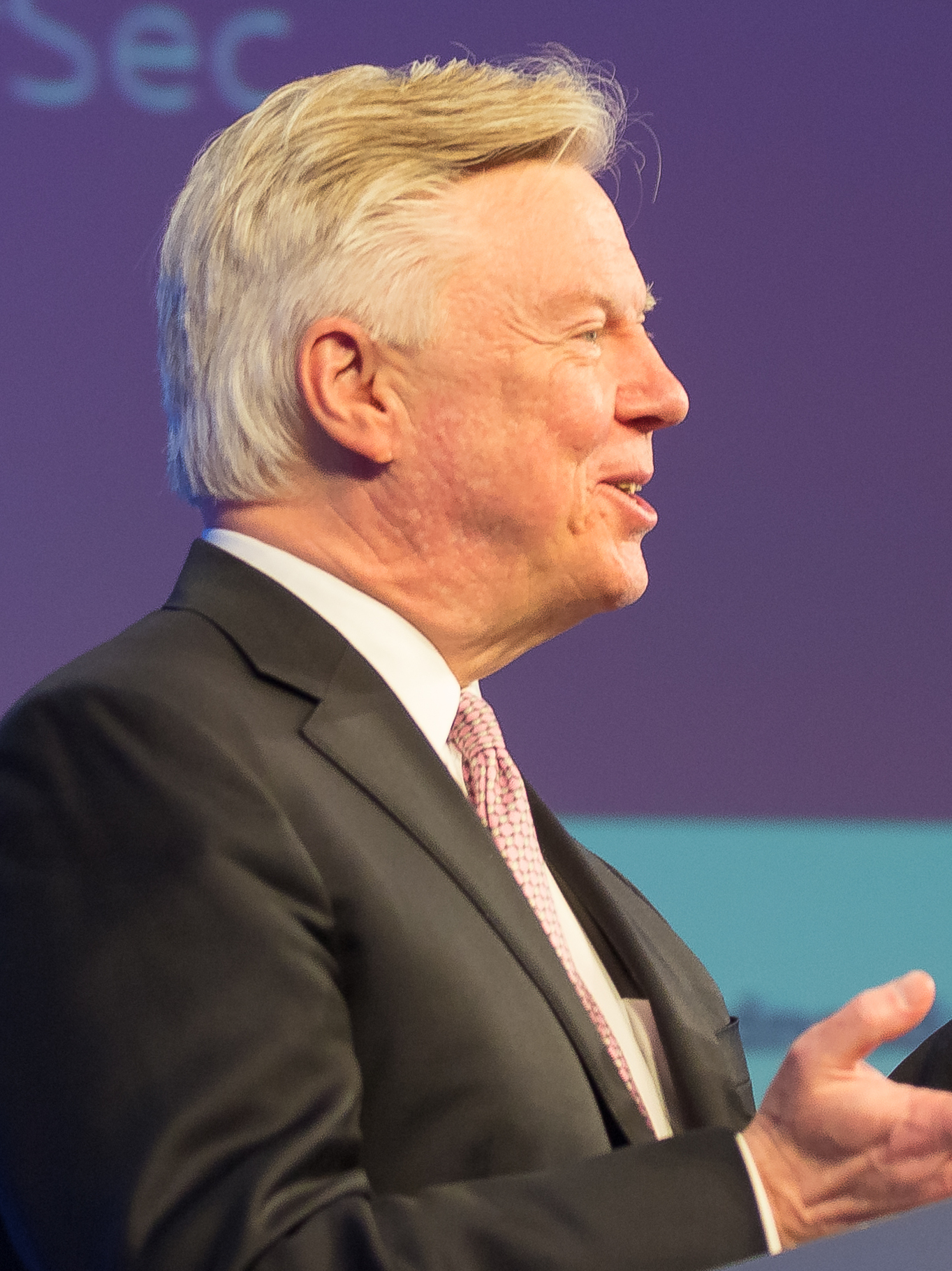
- Schmittlein in 2016

Dean of the MIT Sloan School of Management
- In office August 27, 2007 – February 5, 2024

Personal details
- Born: April 15, 1955 Northampton, Massachusetts, U.S.
- Died: March 13, 2025 (aged 69)
- Education: Brown University (BA); Columbia University (MPhil, PhD)

David C. Schmittlein (April 15, 1955 – March 13, 2025) was an American academic administrator who served as the John C Head III Dean and Professor of Marketing at the MIT Sloan School of Management for 17 years. He was appointed on August 27, 2007 and served until stepping down on February 5, 2024. Prior to joining MIT, Schmittlein was the Ira A. Lipman Professor and Professor of Marketing at the Wharton School of the University of Pennsylvania.

== Background ==
Schmittlein was a native of Northampton, Massachusetts. He earned a B.A. in mathematics from Brown University in 1977 and received his M.Phil. and Ph.D. in business from Columbia Business School in 1979 and 1980, respectively.

Schmittlein died on March 13, 2025, at the age of 69.

== Career ==
Schmittlein was formerly a professor of marketing at the Wharton School of the University of Pennsylvania and chair of the editorial board for Wharton School Publishing. He joined MIT in 2007 as the first dean of the Sloan School of Management since 1966 to be recruited from outside the university. On January 30, 2024, he announced he was stepping down from his role in order to attend to a personal health concern.

In 2015, Schmittlein joined the board of CIGNEX Datamatics, an open-source software company based in Santa Clara, California.
