= Julian Geiger =

Julian R. Geiger was the chief executive officer of Aeropostale.

== Career ==
Geiger received his BA in History from Columbia College and his MBA from Columbia Business School.

From 1975 to 1993, Geiger held a wide range of merchandising positions at R.H. Macy & Co. including president of merchandising for Macy's East. He then served as president of the Eagle Eye Kids wholesale and retail divisions of Asian American Partners from 1993 to 1996. In 1996, he joined Federated Department Stores as president and chief executive officer of Federated Specialty Stores, a division of the company. Geiger then served as CEO of Aeropostale from 1996 to 2010. He has been chairman of the board at Aeropostale, Inc. since August 1998 He then served as president and CEO of Crumbs Bake Shops from November 2011 through December 2013, leading them into bankruptcy. In August 2014, Geiger rejoined Aeropostale as CEO, succeeding Thomas P. Johnson. Geiger announced his retirement from his position as CEO of Aeropostale in November 2016, but continues to serve on the company's board of directors.
