= Surprise Gardener =

Surprise Gardener is a TV series on Home & Garden Television (HGTV) which aired from 1998 to 2003. Each week, host Susie Coelho welcomed a guest designer to perform a much needed backyard or garden makeover. Each makeover was performed in a single day.

== Cast ==
- Susie Coelho - Host
- Duncan McIntosh - Landscape Designer
- Tonya van der Wal - Landscape Designer
- Dan Weeden - Landscape Architect
- Wendy Hawker - Landscape Designer
- Jill Harris - Landscape Designer
- Daveena Limonick - Landscape Designer
- Stephanie Rose - Landscape Designer
- Michal Conor - Landscape Designer
- Darrell Tsutsui - Landscape Designer
- Bruce Meeks - Landscape Designer
- Christopher Robbins - Landscape Designer

== Crew ==
- Gary Bernstein Executive Producer
- Steven Radosh - Executive Producer
- Karen Cadle - Producer
- David Loitz - Producer
- Tonya van der Wal - Producer
- Ernesto "Tito" Romero - Producer, Director
- Thomas Shull - Assistant Director
- Daved Gabbard - Production Advisor
- Steve Bluestein - Production Coordinator
- Justin Lillge - Assistant Production Office Coordinator
- Dee Dee Cecil - Production Secretary
- Kirk Demorest, JE Chase- Editor
- Aleksandar Sashko Jovanovic - Sound mixer

== Writers ==
- Tonya van der Wal
- Thomas Shull
- Stephanie Rose
- Patricia Brown
- Brian Wogensen

== Episode guide ==
=== Season 1 ===
- SPG-101 Yard Design, Sandbox
- SPG-102 Flowers, Redwood Bark Uses
- SPG-103 Runaway Garden
- SPG-104 English Garden
- SPG-105 Low Maintenance
- SPG-106 Regaining Control
- SPG-107 Large Tree
- SPG-108 Large Yards
- SPG-109 Pool Ideas, Garden Makeover
- SPG-110 Large Yard Landscaping
- SPG-112 Rustic Garden, Split-Rail Fence
- SPG-113 Shade Plants, Inviting Yard

=== Season 2 ===
- SPG-201 Oriental Planting Design
- SPG-202 Dining Al Fresco
- SPG-203 Children's Backyard
- SPG-204 Limited Budget Ideas
- SPG-205 Groundcover
- SPG-206 Return to Yesteryear
- SPG-207 Geometric Yard Design
- SPG-208 Child-Friendly Yard Design
- SPG-209 Flowers All Year-Round
- SPG-210 Sandy and Windy Terrain, Terrace, Pathway
- SPG-211 Old Country Setting
- SPG-212 Evergreens and Rocks, Waterfall Focal Point
- SPG-213 Evergreens and Rocks

=== Season 3 ===
- SPG-301 Mountain View Design, Training Wisteria
- SPG-302 Concrete Side Yard
- SPG-303 A Stroll in the Park
- SPG-304 Creating Privacy
- SPG-305 Secret Garden
- SPG-306 Softening the Edges
- SPG-307 Nesting Bird Removal
- SPG-308 Rose Garden
- SPG-309 Creating Shade
- SPG-310 Country Garden
- SPG-311 Hillside Yard
- SPG-312 Tropical Setting
- SPG-313 Welcoming Entrance, Proper Planting, Healthy Soil, Porch
- SPG-314 Informal Victorian Garden
- SPG-315 Poolside Solutions
- SPG-316 Recycled Garden, Citrus Tree Transplant, Corner Trellis
- SPG-317 Safe Play Area, Easy Birdbath
- SPG-318 Small Backyard, Raised Veggie Planter, Kids' Garden
- SPG-319 Drought Tolerant
- SPG-320 Canyon Garden, "Rusted Iron" Planters, Hanging Pot Watering
- SPG-321 Outdoor Living
- SPG-322 Poolside Planting
- SPG-323 Shade Garden
- SPG-324 Rock and Turf
- SPG-325 Recycled Garden
- SPG-326 Feng Shui Garden

=== Season 4 ===
- SPG-401 Picnic Garden
- SPG-402 Small Urban Space
- SPG-403 Neglected Yard
- SPG-404 Allergy-Free Garden
- SPG-405 A Children's Garden *Garden-based learning
- SPG-406 Cottage Garden
- SPG-407 Rooftop Garden
- SPG-408 Family Garden
- SPG-409 Effective Simplicity
- SPG-410 Painted Garden
- SPG-411 Garden Retreat
- SPG-412 Treasure Garden
- SPG-413 Secluded Garden
- SPG-414 Fiesta Garden
- SPG-415 Front Yard Garden
- SPG-416 Backyard Patio Garden
- SPG-417 A Home Outdoors
- SPG-418 Fire Station Garden
- SPG-419 A Starter Garden
- SPG-420 Resort Garden
- SPG-421 A Rustic Garden
- SPG-422 Desert Oasis
- SPG-423 Attracting Birds
- SPG-424 A Meditation Garden
- SPG-425 Asian-Style Garden
- SPG-426 A Rectangular Garden

=== Season 5 ===
- SPG-501 Old World Garden
- SPG-502 Paths and Flower Beds
- SPG-503 Patio Garden
- SPG-504 A Simple Garden
- SPG-505 Foundation Garden
- SPG-506 The Relaxing Hideaway Garden
- SPG-507 Shore-Side Garden
- SPG-508 Mediterranean-Style Garden
- SPG-509 The Outdoor Room
- SPG-510 Space Gardener
- SPG-511 Vine and Arbor Garden
- SPG-512 The Reading Garden
- SPG-513 Hillside Garden

=== Season 6 ===
- SPG-601 The Western Garden
- SPG-602 Family Garden
- SPG-603 A Whimsical Garden
- SPG-604 Recycled Items Garden
- SPG-605 The City Garden
- SPG-606 An Asian-Influenced Garden
- SPG-607 A Place to Go
- SPG-608 Trikes and Bikes Garden
- SPG-609 A Romantic Garden
- SPG-610 Gardening Without a Garden
- SPG-611 An Exotic Shade Garden
- SPG-612 A Sunny-Side Garden
- SPG-613 A Tropical Garden Party

=== Season 7 ===
- SPG-701 The All-Grasses Garden
- SPG-702 The Welcoming Garden
- SPG-703 No-Lawn Garden
- SPG-704 An Exotic Tropical Garden
- SPG-705 Adding Charm to an Average Garden
- SPG-706 Sprucing Up an Old Garden
- SPG-707 A Low-Maintenance Pond Garden
- SPG-708 A Cool Blue Garden
- SPG-709 A Walled Garden
- SPG-710 Circular Forms
- SPG-711 Vines and Flowers Garden
- SPG-712 A Garden for Busy People
- SPG-713 An Easy-Care Formal Yard

=== Season 8 ===
- SPG-801 A Cape Cod Garden
- SPG-802 A Southern Garden
- SPG-803 A Side Garden
- SPG-804 A Rose and Perennial Garden
- SPG-805 Peaceful Perennial Garden
- SPG-806 A Simple Garden
- SPG-807 An Asian-Inspired Garden
- SPG-808 Garden of Sunset Colors
- SPG-809 A Restful Garden Retreat
- SPG-810 A Garden with Curb Appeal
- SPG-811 A Patio Garden
- SPG-812 Island Bed Garden
- SPG-813 Blending in the Garden
