= Rochelle Lazarus =

American business executive (born 1947)

Rochelle B. Lazarus
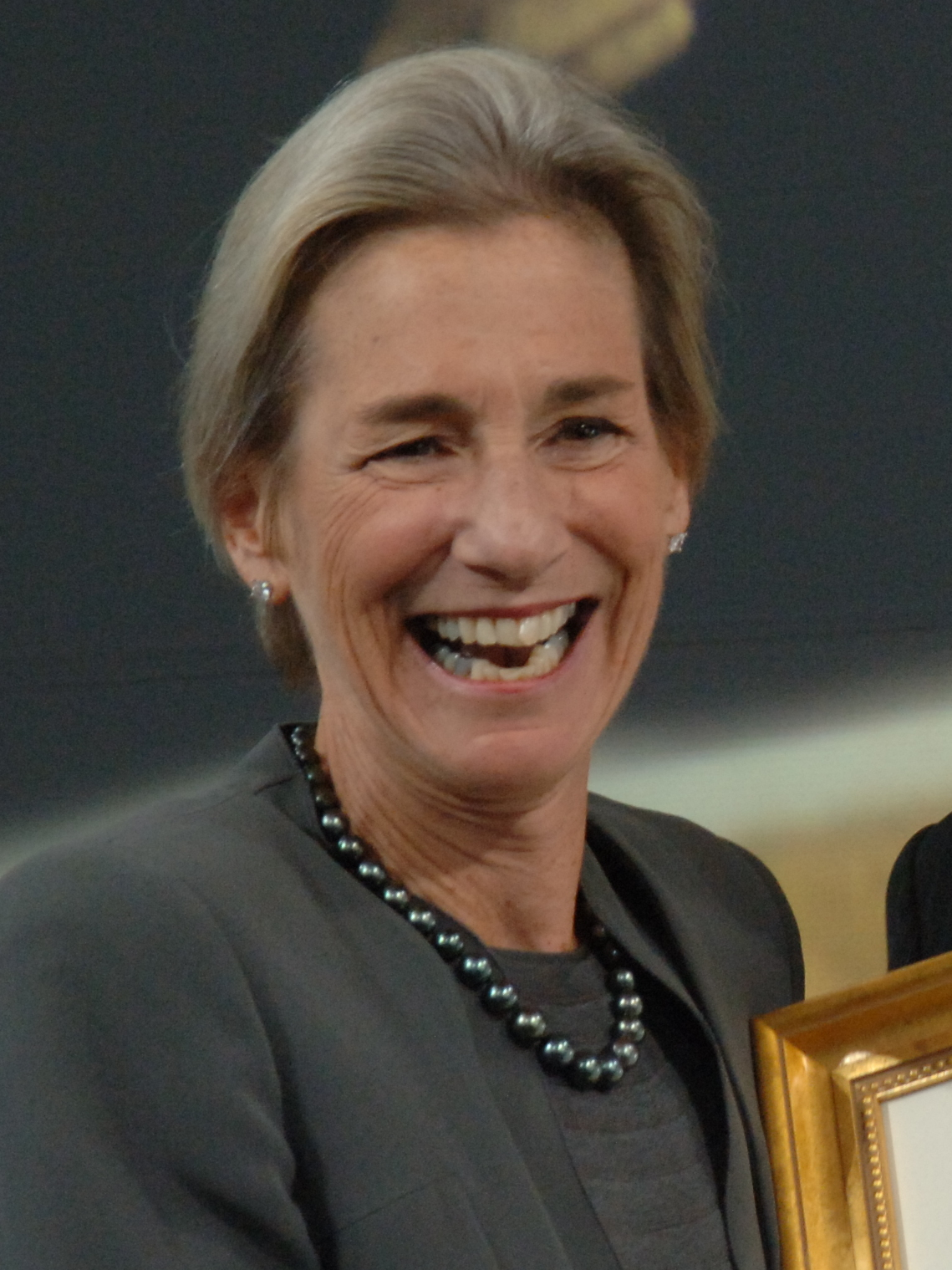
- Lazarus in 2006
- Born: Rochelle Esta Braff; September 1, 1947 (age 79); New York City, U.S.
- Education: Smith College (B.A.); Columbia University (M.B.A.)
- Known for: Chairman Emeritus of Ogilvy & Mather
- Spouse: George M. Lazarus (m. 1970; died 2025)
- Children: 3

Rochelle "Shelly" Lazarus (born September 1, 1947) is an American business executive who is the chairman emerita of Ogilvy & Mather.

== Early life and career ==
Lazarus was born on September 1, 1947, in Brooklyn, New York City. She is the daughter of Lewis and Sylvia Braff. She graduated from Midwood High School in Brooklyn before going to Smith College. Lazarus also obtained an MBA from Columbia Business School. She joined Ogilvy & Mather in 1971 and became President of its U.S. direct marketing business in 1989. She later became President of Ogilvy & Mather New York, followed by President of Ogilvy & Mather North America. In 1995, Lazarus became president and chief operating officer of the company, before becoming CEO in 1996 and chairman in 1997. She held the title of CEO until 2008 but remained chairman until 2012, when she became chairman emeritus.

Lazarus serves on the boards of General Electric, Merck & Co., New York Presbyterian Hospital, the American Museum of Natural History, The Blackstone Group, Rockefeller Capital Management, Lincoln Center for the Performing Arts, and the World Wildlife Fund. She is also a member of the Board of Overseers for Columbia Business School.

== Personal ==
Lazarus was married to Dr. George Mitchell Lazarus on March 22, 1970. They had three children, Theodore Pipiens, Samantha Rana May (married to Duncan Levin), and Benjamin Harrison Cates. Her husband died in 2025.
