= Susie Coelho =

Actress, author, and businesswoman (born 1953)

- Born: December 7, 1953 (age 72); Cuckfield, Sussex, England
- Education: American University
- Spouses: Sonny Bono (m. 1981; div. 1984) Robert Rounds (divorced) Michael A. Peel (m. 2017)
- Children: 2

Susie Coelho (born December 7, 1953) is an American television personality, author, and businesswoman.

== Early life ==
Susie Coelho was born in Cuckfield, Sussex, England on December 7, 1953, to parents George and Rani Coelho. She is of Konkani Goan heritage and grew up in Bethesda, Maryland. She attended the American University in Washington DC.

== Career ==
Early in her career, Coelho worked as a model signed to Ford Models, an actress, and entertainment reporter. In 1982, she played the role of an art teacher in the film Breakin' 2: Electric Boogaloo. In 1983, as a journalist, she travelled to India to interview Phoolan Devi, known as “The Bandit Queen” of Central India, while she was a fugitive from justice. She also co-founded the restaurant Bono's in Hollywood, in addition to the fashion boutique A Star is Worn.

In 1997, Susie Coelho founded Susie Coelho Enterprises, Inc. She was an on-air contributor to The View and the Today Show. She was the host of the HGTV television series Surprise Gardener and Outer Spaces. She has also authored four lifestyle books, Everyday Styling (Simon & Schuster 2002), Styling for Entertaining (Simon & Schuster 2004), Secrets of a Style Diva: A Get-Inspired Guide to Your Creative Side (Thomas Nelson 2006), and Style Your Dream Wedding (Thomas Nelson 2008). She was awarded the Women in Film & Video-DC Women of Vision Awards in 2007.

== Design ==
In 2019, Coelho founded House of Sussex, a fashion accessories brand focusing on collaborations with artists, creating backpacks using former street and tattoo artists designs, and also jewelry. In addition to being for sale, her pieces have been displayed in museums. She has also designed furnishings and accessories for retail: Mervyn's with “Susie Coelho Style”, Grandin Road through a Signature Collection, and QVC with “Susie Coelho Home”.

== Personal life ==
Coelho was married to Sonny Bono from 1981 to 1984, having been in a relationship with him since the mid-1970s. She was then married to Robert Rounds with whom she shares two children. She has been married to Michael A. Peel since 2017.

== Filmography ==
=== Film ===
| Year | Title | Role | Notes |
|---|---|---|---|
| 1978 | The Norseman | Winetta | |
| 1979 | Mysterious Island of Beautiful Women | Jo Jo | TV Movie |
| 1980 | A Perfect Match | Margo | TV movie |
| 1984 | Breakin' 2: Electric Boogaloo | Rhonda | |
| 1985 | Perfect | Party guest | uncredited |
| 1995 | Theodore Rex | Dr. Armitraj | |
| 1998 | You Lucky Dog | Reporter | Disney Channel TV movie |

=== Television ===
| Year | Title | Role | Episode/Notes |
|---|---|---|---|
| 1975 | The Six Million Dollar Man | Linda | "The Song and Dance Spy" (future spouse Sonny Bono also appeared in this episode) |
| 1976 | Police Story | Sheila | "Oxford Gray" |
| 1992 | Bring 'Em Back Alive | Tah-Ri | "The Shadow Women of Chung-Tai" (credited as Susie Bono) |
| 1997 | Mad About You | Woman #1 | "The Birth: Part 2" |
| 1997 | 'C-16: FBI | Reporter #1 | "Radio FBI" |
| 2004 | Outer Spaces | Host | |
