= N. Robert Hammer =

American businessman

N. Robert "Bob" Hammer is an American businessman who served as the chairman, president, and CEO of CommVault Systems from 1998 to 2019.

== Early life and career ==
Hammer obtained his bachelor's degree from Columbia University and his Masters in Business Administration from Columbia Business School.

Hammer spent 15 years in various positions with Celanese. He then joined Material Progress, where he served as chairman, president, and CEO from 1982 to 1987. He later served as chairman, president, and CEO of Telequest from 1987 to 1988. Following that, he served as chairman, president, and CEO of Norand Corporation from 1988 until it was acquired in 1997. He continued at Norand, until its IPO in 1993. Hammer then joined Sprout Group. In 1998, he became chairman, president, and CEO of CommVault Systems.

Hammer retired from his position in 2019.
