= C.E. Unterberg, Towbin =

American investment bank

- Type: Corporation
- Industry: Investment services
- Founded: 1932
- Defunct: 2007
- Fate: Acquired
- Successor: L. F. Rothschild, Unterberg, Towbin (later Collins Stewart)
- Products: Financial services Investment banking

C.E. Unterberg, Towbin, was an American investment bank. Founded as C.E. Unterberg & Co. in 1932 by Clarence E. Unterberg, the firm changed its name to C.E Unterberg, Towbin & Co., in 1953.

== History ==
The firm began as a niche over-the-counter trading firm. Following World War II, the firm made a name for itself as an investment banker for the technology oriented companies of the period.

Following its merger with L.F. Rothschild in 1977, the firm was known as L. F. Rothschild, Unterberg, Towbin and was led primarily by Thomas I. Unterberg and A. Robert Towbin. The firm was known for its merchant banking investments, particularly in high-technology companies. In the early 1980s, the firm emerged as the leading underwriter of initial public offerings, surpassing the elite investment banks (at the time, including Lehman Brothers, Goldman Sachs, and Morgan Stanley). Among the companies they took public were Intel, Cray Research, and biotechnology company Cetus Corporation. Following the 1986 departure of Tom Unterberg and Bob Towbin for Lehman Brothers, the firm became known as L.F. Rothschild until it filed Chapter 11 in 1989.

Subsequently, in 1990, Tom Unterberg started a new firm with investment banker Bob Harris, formerly of Alex. Brown & Sons, called Unterberg Harris. The firm focused on raising capital for growth companies, with a focus in the technology, healthcare and global security sectors. In 1995, Towbin joined the firm and in 1997, Bob Harris left for Bear Stearns, so the company took on the C.E. Unterberg, Towbin name once again. After January 2002, John Gutfreund, a former CEO of Salomon Brothers became senior managing director of the bank. On July 16, 2007, the firm was acquired by UK-based investment bank Collins Stewart, and assumed that firm's name.

== Notable alumni ==
- James Satloff, former CEO of the firm; founder of Liberty Skis
