= Seungpil Yu =

South Korean businessman (born 1946)

- Born: September 23, 1946; South Korea
- Children: Robert Wonsang Yu

Seungpil Yu or Yoo Seung-Pil (Korean: 유승필; Hanja: 柳承弼; born September 23, 1946) is a Korean business executive. He is the former chairman and CEO of Yuyu Pharma, a South Korean pharmaceutical company that engages in the research, development, manufacture and sales of medicines, vitamins, health foods, medical devices, and cosmetics.

== Education ==
Yu attended Columbia Business School from 1969 to 1971 and graduated with an MBA, followed by study for a PhD between 1973 and 1979. He graduated with a PhD in International Business Administration.

== Career ==
Yu served as Assistant Professor of Business Administration at Sogang University and Kyung Hee University in 1972. From 1976 to 1978, he served as Instructor at Fordham University in New York City and Fairleigh Dickinson University in New Jersey, then served as assistant professor at Pace University Graduate School in New York from 1979 to 1982. Between 1987 and 2001 he was CEO and president of Yuyu Industrial Co. Ltd. Since 1994 he has served as chief director of foundation at Sejong University. Yu is also serving as vice-president of WSMI (World Self Medication Industry) Asia-Pacific Region since 1993 and has served as vice-president of KPMA (Korea Pharmaceutical Manufacturers Association) from 1995 to 2000 and KPMA chairman of the board from 2001 to Feb 2003. Yu has also served as president of the Columbia University Alumni Association in Korea from 1997 to 2001. Since 2001, Yu has been appointed and is serving as chairman and CEO of Yuyu Pharma, Inc. He has also been Haiti's Honorary Consul in Seoul since 1997.

== Honors and public recognition ==
In April 2003, Yu received the Order of Civil Merit, Moran Medal (Presidential Award) which is the highest award that is bestowed on civilians.
