= Benjamin Wey =

Chinese American businessman

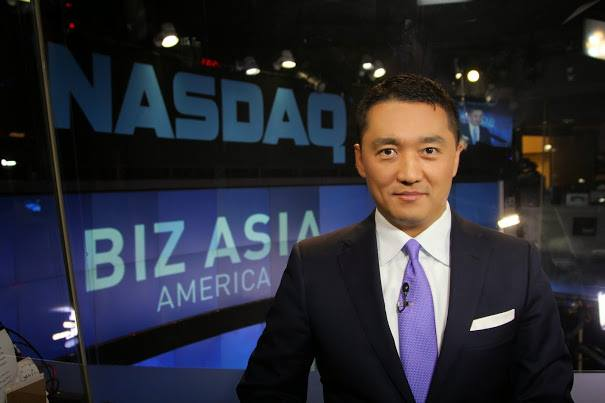
- Benjamin Wey
- Born: 1971 (age 54–55); Tianjin, China
- Other names: Benjamin Tianbing Wei, 魏天冰
- Citizenship: US
- Education: Oklahoma Baptist University (1992); University of Central Oklahoma (1999); Columbia Business School (2013)
- Occupations: Businessman, financier

Benjamin Wey (Benjamin Tianbing Wei, Chinese: 魏天冰; pinyin: Wèi Tiānbīng) is a Chinese-born US Wall Street financier and CEO of New York Global Group (NYGG). He began his financial career as an investment advisor and broker in Oklahoma in the late 1990s. Wey and NYGG were among the most active "facilitators and promoters" of reverse takeovers, which created Special-Purpose Acquisition Companies (SPAC) and allowed small Chinese companies to raise capital on U.S. markets, until reverse takeovers became the subject of a U.S. Securities and Exchange Commission investigation in 2011.

In 2015, Wey was indicted on federal securities fraud and money laundering charges involving alleged undisclosed corporate ownership interests. However, in 2017, the presiding judge suppressed all seized evidence on the grounds that the search warrants violated the Fourth Amendment, leading prosecutors to voluntarily dismiss all charges that August.

In a defamation suit filed against Wey in 2016, a New York court subsequently ruled that articles published in his digital magazine, TheBlot, are protected under the First Amendment.

== Early life and education ==
Wey was born in Tianjin, China. His father was a diplomat with the Ministry of Foreign Affairs and his mother an electrical engineer. He went to the United States on a full scholarship (according to a 2010 interview) to study finance at Oklahoma Baptist University, graduating in 1992. While still at college, he had his own trade business which he continued after his graduation while at the same time studying at the University of Central Oklahoma for a master's degree in Business Administration which he received in 1999. According to his entry in Columbia Business School's directory, he subsequently obtained a Master of Science in Leadership Development (MSLD) from Columbia.

== Career ==
Wey began his financial career in Oklahoma where he worked as an investment advisor and stock broker. In 2000, he became the CEO of the Oklahoma-based Benchmark Global Capital Group. In 2002 Wey was fined $5,000 and suspended by the U.S. National Association of Securities Dealers, now FINRA, for "maintaining accounts" at his brokerage firm without informing the firm in writing. The Oklahoma Department of Securities censured Way and he agreed not to request registration as a broker in the state. They claimed that he had advised a retired 68-year-old woman to invest her entire life savings in the Nasdaq listed stock of Pharmaprint, a "risky penny stock," without disclosing that he was a paid consultant to the company. Without admitting or denying the allegations, Wey agreed to cease carrying out all brokerage and investment advisory business in the state.

In 2000, Wey expanded his base of operations to New York City where he is the CEO of New York Global Group, a U.S. and Beijing-based financial firm that had managed 200 China-related transactions as of 2011, and was described by the Financial Times as a "key 'bridge' between fast-growing Chinese companies and US capital markets." The firm claims access to approximately $1 billion in capital. The firm is noted for advising and underwriting reverse mergers, in which companies are taken public in the United States by acquiring the corporate shells of U.S. companies that are no longer in operation and whose shares had previously been listed in an American equities market. The firm reported in 2009 that 15% of Chinese companies listed on the NASDAQ stock exchange were its clients.

By 2012, regulators had stepped up action against certain Chinese reverse-takeover stocks, but according to the Financial Times had been hamstrung by lack of cooperation from Chinese regulators. Among such stocks were Bodisen Biotech, which was taken public by NYGG via a SPAC and was delisted from the American Stock Exchange three years later in 2007. The exchange cited "internal control weaknesses related to its accounting and financial reporting obligations" and "incomplete, inaccurate and/or misleading information related to its relationship with, and payments to, a consultancy firm and its affiliates"

== Controversies ==
=== The Blot lawsuit ===
Wey solicits media attention and bills himself as an expert in U.S.-China trade relations. He has appeared on various TV media outlets including The Wall Street Journal TV, Fox Business News and TheStreetTV. In a Columbia Journalism Review column in 2010, financial journalist Felix Salmon cited Wey's pursuit of publicity as an example of persons receiving media placement because of the hiring of public relations representatives and not their expertise. Wey also contributed articles to the digital publication TheBlot, where he was described as an "investigative reporter." In 2015, he was named as defendant in a defamation suit stemming from his articles critical of a FINRA arbitrator and Georgetown University law professor Christopher Brummer. An injunction was issued preventing The Blot from writing about Brummer while the suit was pending. In September 2017, the Electronic Frontier Foundation called on New York Court to vacate the injunction as unconstitutional. On November 15, 2018, the New York Court of Appeals, First Division ruled in favor of The Blot magazine against Brummer. In 2016, Bloomberg Businessweek and the Columbia Journalism Review reported that Wey used The Blot Magazine to defame and threaten investigative journalists Dune Lawrence and Roddy Boyd. The Blot's articles accused Boyd and Lawrence of illegal stock short selling tied to organized crime.

=== Sexual harassment claims ===
In July 2014, Wey was sued by a former summer intern Hannah Bouveng, who alleged that she was wrongfully fired after she reported that another employee was "repeatedly and consistently” the subject of "disgusting and degrading quid pro quo sexual harassment". The intern filed an $850 million lawsuit against Wey's company. Law360 quoted Wey as saying that the lawsuits were "frivolous" and "an extortion attempt." The trial which took place in June 2015 ended with the jury awarding Bouveng $18 million—$2 million in compensatory damages and $16 million in punitive damages, primarily for defamation by Wey, NYGG, and its subsidiary FNL Media who publish TheBlot. The allegations of assault and battery were rejected by the jurors. In April 2016, the award was reduced to $5.6 million by a Federal District Court judge. Wey filed a counterclaim against Bouveng.

In June 2018, Bouveng withdrew all claims again Wey. The lawsuit ended in Wey’s favor. In a signed court order, the New York federal judge declared “the Judgment and Amended Judgment are hereby vacated, and shall be null and void and of no force or effect.”

=== FBI Investigation and Dismissal of Charges ===
Wey's Wall Street offices had been searched by the Federal Bureau of Investigation in January 2012 as part of a continuing investigation. According to David Barboza writing in The New York Times, it was the "strongest indication yet" that US federal investigators may have started to probe the advisers and promoters involved in "so-called backdoor listings of Chinese companies." In September 2015, Wey was charged with eight counts of conspiracy, securities and wire fraud, and money laundering in connection with his reverse merger scheme and involving the companies SmartHeat, Deer Consumer Products, and CleanTech Innovations. Wey was accused of using the offshore accounts to cloak transactions between Chinese operating companies and American shell companies. In addition to the criminal charges, the SEC filed a parallel civil lawsuit against Wey which also included as defendants Wey's wife, his sister, and two of his attorneys, all of whom were alleged by SEC complaint to have committed "violations or the aiding and abetting of violations of the antifraud provisions and the disclosure and reporting provisions of the federal securities laws".

In a June 2017 order by New York Federal Judge Alison Nathan, all of the evidence seized in connection with the searches conducted by the Federal Bureau of Investigation was thrown out on Fourth Amendment grounds against unreasonable searches and seizure, ruling that the Department of Justice and FBI's illegal conduct against Wey and his family “reflects, at least, grossly negligent or reckless disregard of the strictures of the Fourth Amendment”. The United States Department of Justice voluntarily withdrew the indictment on August 8, 2017 as a result of the court order. In September 2017, the SEC dropped its fraud charges against Wey and his wife.

=== NASDAQ claims ===
In 2018, Wey sued NASDAQ and 13 of its executives for $659 million. The lawsuit defendants included Michael Emen, Edwards Knight and NASDAQ CEO Adena Friedman for malicious prosecution and lying to the SEC, DOJ and FBI with fabricated Nasdaq listing rule violation, which had led to the DOJ indictment and SEC charges against Wey. The New York State Supreme Court dismissed the case in February 2020.

=== Buyout of Sri Lankan Debt ===
In 2023, it was revealed that Benjamin Wey had bought $250m in Sri Lankan debt and intended to act as a "hold out", making it difficult for Sri Lanka to recover from the Sri Lankan economic crisis (2019-present).
