= Klaus Enrique =

- Born: Klaus Enrique; 1975 (age 50–51); Mexico City, Mexico
- Occupation: Photographer
- Years active: 11
- Known for: Post-contemporary sculptor & photography
- Website: klausenrique.com

Klaus Enrique /ˈklaʊs ɛnˈriːke/ (born 1975) is a Mexican-German post-contemporary sculptor and photographer known for his recreations of portraits by Italian painter Giuseppe Arcimboldo.

== Early life ==
Enrique grew up in Mexico City. He studied genetics at the University of Nottingham, England, and received an MBA from Columbia Business School in New York City.

== Photography ==
Enrique was a freelance IT consultant before he turned to photography, which he studied at Parsons and at the School of Visual Arts. His portrait of Mother & Daughter was considered for the Photographic Portrait Prize at London's National Portrait Gallery. Subsequently, he has been nominated and short listed for various awards.

In 2011, Enrique won the Curator Award / Emerging Artist of the Year for Still Photography. and in 2013, his "Vertumnus" was included in The History of Still Life in Ten Masterpieces as the Tenth Masterpiece, alongside works by Cézanne, Goya, and Warhol. His work is in the permanent collection of the Museum of Fine Arts Houston, the Leslie/Lohman Museum and the Haggerty Museum of Art.
