= Michael A. Peel =

Academic administrator

Michael Peel
- Education: M.B.A., Finance
- Alma mater: Columbia Business School
- Known for: Human Resources Management
- Spouse: Susie Coelho (m. 2017)
- Awards: Fellow of The National Academy of Human Resources

Michael A. Peel is an American human resources professional and a fellow of The National Academy of Human Resources. He served as the vice-president of human resources and administration for Yale University until his retirement in 2017. Prior to his position a Yale, he served 17 years at General Mills.

== Career ==
Michael A. Peel received his M.B.A. in finance from Columbia Business School. Peel spent 15 years at PepsiCo, including as chief human resources officer for two of its subsidiaries. He joined General Mills in 1991 as their chief human resources officer and was named executive vice-president of human resources and global business services in 2007. In July 2008 Peel appeared in the cover story of Human Resources Executive magazine. Upon leaving General Mills, he was hired by Yale University. In 2002, Peel was elected as a fellow of The National Academy of Human Resources.

== Boards ==
Peel has been a board member of the Walker Art Center board of directors, and is a former vice chair of the Human Resources Policy Association. He also became a member of the board of Sleep Number Corporation in 2003, and he has been a member of the board of directors for Pier 1 Imports, Inc since 2013. In 2018 Peel became a senior advisor to ghSMART & Company, Inc and a board member of DeVry University.
