= Charles E. Exley Jr. =

Charles E. Exley Jr. was the President (1976–1988), Chairman (1984–1992), and CEO (1983–1993) of NCR Corporation.

== Early life and career ==
Exley obtained a B.A. from Wesleyan University in 1951 and an MBA from Columbia Business School in 1954. A 22-year veteran of the Burroughs Corporation, Exley was appointed president of NCR in 1976 and served in that position until 1988. He served as CEO from 1983 to 1993 and Chairman from 1984 to 1992.
