= Jean-Marc Perraud =

French businessman

Jean-Marc Perraud is a French businessman who was executive vice president and CFO of Schlumberger.

== Biography ==
A graduate of the École des Hautes Études Commerciales, he received his MBA from Columbia Business School where he was a Fulbright scholar. Perraud also holds a law degree from Paris University.

Perraud was executive vice president and chief financial officer (CFO) of Schlumberger. Prior to this role, he was the company's controller and chief accounting officer. He had served as treasurer of Schlumberger Limited, and before that he was the company's vice president and director of tax.

Over his 33 years with Schlumberger Perraud held a variety of management positions in Paris, New York City, Rio de Janeiro and London. Previous roles included serving as group controller for Schlumberger Industries, group controller for Drilling & Pumping, general manager of Dowell-Schlumberger, group controller for Oilfield Services, controller for Dowell-Schlumberger, controller for Wireline Africa, and assistant treasurer for Schlumberger Limited. He began his career in Schlumberger in 1974.

== Recognitions ==
In 2007 he was named one of the top-performing CFOs by Institutional Investor.
