= David Conner (businessman) =

David Philbrick Conner was the CEO of Oversea-Chinese Banking Corporation until April 14, 2012.

== Early life and career ==
Conner holds a Bachelor of Arts degree from Washington University in St. Louis and a Master of Business Administration from Columbia Business School.

Conner served as CEO of Citibank India from 1996 to 1999. He then served as a Managing Director and Market Manager of Citibank Japan from 1999 to 2002. He joined Oversea-Chinese Banking Corporation in 2002.

In April 2012, Conner retired as CEO of Oversea-Chinese Banking Corporation but remains on the Board of Directors.

As of January 2016, Conner became an independent non-executive Director with Standard Chartered PLC. He is also on the Board Risk Committee, Audit Committee and the Board Financial Crime Risk Committee. He succeeded Dr. Lars Thunell as Chair of the Board Risk Committee. He is also currently acting as a non-executive director of GasLog Partners LP.

He was awarded the Best Chief Executive by the Singapore Corporate Awards in 2012.
