= Pip Simmonds =

New Zealand freestyle skier

- Born: April 17; New Zealand
- Occupation: Freeskier
- Known for: Freeskiing and making jewelry

Pip Simmonds is a New Zealand freestyle skier. She was the New Zealand freestyle and half-pipe champion for many years. Simmonds represented New Zealand as a finalist at the US Open.

Pip is not only a freeskier. She also makes jewelry out of native New Zealand shells. She started making jewelry when she was living in Telluride, Colorado.

Simmonds has sponsorships with many of the largest companies in the ski industry. She is sponsored by Smith Optics NZ, Icebreaker NZ, and Liberty Skis.

She has written a series of fiction novels and now lives on the beach and surfs as much as possible.
