= Nancy McKinstry =

American businessperson

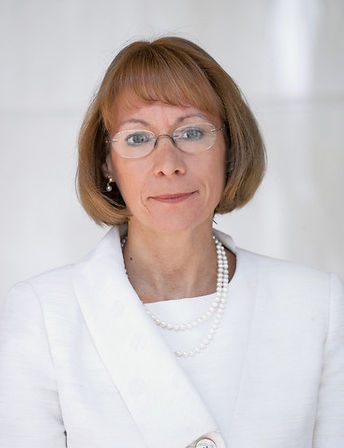
- McKinstry in 2012
- Born: January 4, 1959 (age 67); Portland, Connecticut, U.S.
- Education: University of Rhode Island; Columbia Business School
- Occupation: Former CEO of Wolters Kluwer (Retired in Feb 2026)

Nancy McKinstry (born January 4, 1959) is an American businesswoman. She was the CEO and chairwoman of the executive board of Wolters Kluwer, from September 2003 (and a member of the executive board since June 2001), until she retired in February 2026.

== Early life and education ==
McKinstry was born in Portland, Connecticut in the United States. She holds an MBA (Finance & Marketing) from Columbia Business School, a bachelor's degree in economics from University of Rhode Island (Phi Beta Kappa), and received an honorary doctorate from University of Rhode Island.

== Early career ==
Early in her career, McKinstry held management positions with Booz & Company (formerly Booz Allen Hamilton, currently known as Strategy&), an international management consulting firm, where she focused on assignments in the media and technology industries.

In 1999, McKinstry worked as CEO of SCP Communications, a medical information company, before rejoining Wolters Kluwer to head its North American operations.

== Wolters Kluwer ==
Before becoming CEO of Wolters Kluwer in 2003, McKinstry was chief executive of the company's North American operations and had held a range of senior positions at subsidiaries, including chief executive of CCH Legal Information Services, now a part of Wolters Kluwer's Legal & Regulatory division. She has been a member of the Executive Board since 2001. Earlier, McKinstry held product management positions with CCH INCORPORATED, now part of Wolters Kluwer'sTax & Accounting division. She is the Dutch company's first American and first female chief executive.

McKinstry has noted her focus of diversity within the organisation quoting "If you don't have enough diversity at that level, it will be very difficult to get diversity at the most senior levels". As of the end of 2012, Wolters Kluwer had 28% female executives (in 2003, only 20% had top leadership posts), 43% female managers, and 54% female employees.

Nancy McKinstry retired from Wolters Kluwer in February of 2026. Stacey Caywood is her successor.

== Boards and honors ==
McKinstry is a director of Sanoma Oyj and Abbott. She is a member of the Advisory Council of the Amsterdam Institute of Finance, the Advisory Board for the University of Rhode Island, the Advisory Board of the Harrington School of Communication and Media, and the Board of Overseers of Columbia Business School. In August 2011, she was appointed by the Chinese State Council Information Office as a member of the Foreign Consultant Committee, given her astute business leadership and long-standing expertise in the information and publishing industry.

In 2012 McKinstry was ranked number 15 on Fortune's Global 50 Most Powerful Women in Business (and 13 in 2011.) She has been in the top 10 on this list in 2004, 2005, and 2006.

She has been among the Financial Times' Top 50 Women in World Business for several consecutive years, being listed at number 17 most recently in 2011. In 2009 McKinstry was ranked number 43 on the Forbes list of 100 Most Powerful Women, on which she represented one of the two women based in the Netherlands (the other being Dutchwoman Neelie Kroes).

In August 2011, she has been appointed by the Chinese State Council Information Office as a member of the Foreign Consultant Committee.

In April 2021 she was criticized in the Dutch press for having the highest salary of any CEO in the Netherlands as compared to the average salary of her employees, earning 137 times the average wage. In 2017 she only earned 83 times the average wage of her co-workers, maintaining not to be aware of her income. In 2020 she received the highest bonus of the 27 largest companies at the Amsterdam Stock Exchange AEX, receiving 12 million Euros compared to an average bonus of 3.2 million.

== Personal life ==
McKinstry is married and has two children, a son and a daughter. Her husband, an anesthesiologist, splits his time between his job in New York and staying home with their children in the Netherlands.

== See also ==
- Interview with McKinstry, New York Times. December 12, 2009.
- Joann Lublin. Theory and Practice: 'Inside Outsiders' Bring Knowledge, Objectivity. Wall Street Journal. New York. Oct. 12, 2009. p. B5.
