= James Satloff =

American businessman (born 1962)

James E. Satloff
- Born: 1962 (age 63–64); Rochester, New York, U.S.
- Education: Pittsford Mendon High School, Columbia College, Columbia Business School
- Known for: Entrepreneur, executive, businessman

James Satloff (born 1962) is an American businessman. He founded Liberty Skis and was the CEO of C.E. Unterberg, Towbin.

== Education ==
James Satloff has an MBA from Columbia Business School and a BA from Columbia College, where he majored in computer science and artificial intelligence with a concentration in humanities and French.

== Biography ==
Satloff is a founder of Liberty Skis, a Colorado-based snow ski manufacturer; the Executive Chairman of InvestorForce, Inc; and a director of Larkspur & Hawk, a New York City-based jewelry manufacturer.

Prior positions include chief executive officer of Inform Technologies LLC from May 24, 2007, to May 2009, and chief executive officer and president of C.E. Unterberg, Towbin. From 1996 through 2004, he was an executive managing director of Standard & Poor's Investment Services, president of its Compustat division, and president of its broker/dealer, Standard & Poor's Securities, Inc. Additionally, he has held positions at Bankers Trust Company, Salomon Brothers, and Touche Ross & Co.; and he co-founded Fusion Management Consulting with Eric Mendelsohn. Satloff previously was a vice president of Bankers Trust Company and vice president of Salomon Brothers. He has been the executive chairman of InvestorForce, Inc. since May 2010.

While at C.E. Unterberg, Towbin, Satloff testified before Congress about the impact of the Sarbanes-Oxley Act of 2002 on small businesses, three years after its passage into law. He further commented on new Securities and Exchange Commission rules concerning so-called well-known seasoned issuers, and the rules' effect on small companies seeking access to the public markets.

James Satloff holds a number of US patents for technological innovation, including ones for a simplified computer keyboard, a system for using trading cards interactively, and a portable computer desk with power generator.

== Personal life and family ==
Satloff is the son of Aaron Satloff, a professor of psychiatry at the University of Rochester. He is married to Emily Unterberg Satloff, with whom he has two sons, including Dustin Satloff. He resides in New York City. His father-in-law, Thomas I. Unterberg, was the chairman of the investment bank L.F. Rothschild.
