= USS Howard F. Clark =

John C. Butler-class destroyer escort of the United States Navy

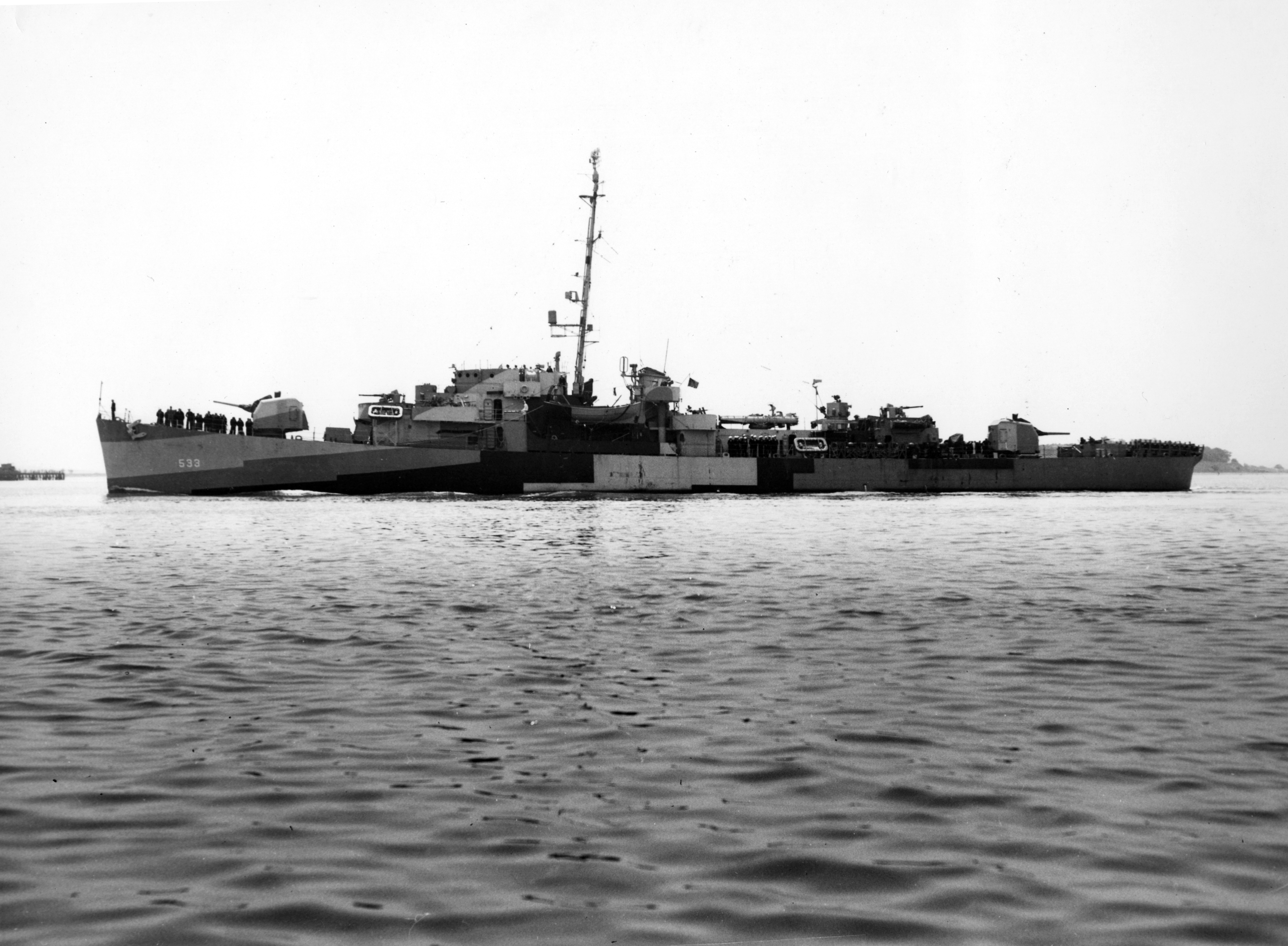

History

United States
- Laid down: 8 October 1943
- Launched: 8 November 1943
- Commissioned: 25 May 1944
- Decommissioned: 15 July 1946
- Stricken: 15 May 1972
- Fate: Sold for scrapping 6 September 1973

General characteristics
- Class & type: John C. Butler-class destroyer escort
- Displacement: 1,350 long tons (1,372 t)
- Length: 306 ft (93 m) (oa)
- Beam: 36 ft 10 in (11.23 m)
- Draft: 13 ft 4 in (4.06 m) (max)
- Propulsion: 2 boilers, 2 geared steam turbines, 12,000 shp, 2 screws
- Speed: 24 knots
- Range: 6,000 nm @ 12 knots
- Complement: 14 officers, 201 enlisted
- Armament: 2-5 in (130 mm), 4 (2×2) 40 mmAA, 10-20 mm AA, 3-21 inch (533 mm) TT, 1 Hedgehog, 8 DCT's, 2 DC tracks

USS Howard F. Clark (DE-533) was a John C. Butler-class destroyer escort in service with the United States Navy from 1944 to 1946. She was sold for scrapping in 1973.

== History ==
Howard F. Clark was named in honor of Howard Franklin Clark who was awarded the Distinguished Flying Cross twice and was missing in action after action in the Battle of the Coral Sea.

She was launched by the Boston Navy Yard 8 November 1943; sponsored by Mrs. Howard Clark, widow of the namesake; and commissioned at Boston, Massachusetts, 25 May 1944.

=== Pacific War ===
Howard, F. Clark conducted shakedown training off Bermuda, returned to Norfolk, Virginia, 16 August, and two days later got underway for the Pacific Ocean. She transited the Panama Canal, called briefly at San Diego, California, and reported for duty at Pearl Harbor 18 September. For the next 3 months Howard F. Clark participated in battle maneuvers and training exercises in preparation for her part in the Navy's sweeping island campaign against Japan. Acting as screening ship during carrier operations, and later training with the Pacific Fleet Gunnery and Torpedo School, She departed Pearl Harbor 11 December 1944.

The destroyer escort arrived Manus 22 December and joined Admiral Stump's escort carrier group, forming for the important Lingayen Gulf invasion. The ships got underway 27 December, with Howard F. Clark in screening position, were joined by fast troop transports, and arrived Leyte Gulf 3 January 1945, where the entire invasion group assembled. This formidable force departed the same day for Lingayen Gulf, and began soon after its departure to experience fierce Japanese air attacks.

The next day, she succeeded in downing several attackers. The toll, especially from suicide attacks, was high, but the force proceeded to its objective after splashing many of the aircraft, and the troops stormed ashore at Lingayen 6 January 1945. During the important landing and the battle which followed, Howard F. Clark screened the escort carriers as they furnished air support to soldiers ashore and flew combat missions to keep the skies above clear of enemy aircraft. The destroyer escort had occasion both 8 and 9 January to rescue downed aviators from the water, and was detached soon after the second rescue to return to Ulithi with Admiral Durgin's carriers.

Arriving 23 January 1945, they got underway 1 February for the next major step in the campaign -- Iwo Jima. She became part of an underway replenishment group off Eniwetok and steamed to the eastward of the Marianas, where the group refueled and replenished Task Force 58 13–14 February. During the next days she protected the refueling operations of many ships in support of the Iwo Jima landings to come, landings which would provide an important air base for attacks against Japan. She arrived off the bitterly contested island 5 March, spent 2 days patrolling the refueling area offshore, and returned to Ulithi 10 March.

Howard F. Clark joined with ammunition-laden LST's at Ulithi and departed 21 March for Okinawa, the next island on the schedule of victory in the Pacific. Reaching recently captured Kerama Retto 28 March with her precious convoy, she then steamed again for refueling rendezvous protecting the task force ships as they refueled. This duty engaged her until returning to Ulithi 13 April, after which the destroyer escort steamed back toward Okinawa 22 April with another refueling task force. Task Force 58 was again serviced 26 April, and 6 May Howard F. Clark departed again for Ulithi as part of the escort for battleship Missouri. She arrived 9 May and was soon at sea again screening another unit of Admiral Beary's U.S. 5th Fleet replenishment group. More refueling operations were conducted in the ocean approaches to Okinawa until 10 June, when Howard F. Clark was detached to escort an oiler unit to Guam. They arrived 13 June and continued to Ulithi, 22 June.

Howard F. Clark continued her vital screening operations as Admiral Beary's group became part of U.S. 3rd Fleet. Steaming from Ulithi 3 July 1945, the ships replenished Task Force 38, thus supporting the carrier strikes against the Japanese mainland. During these operations, 8 July, the alert escort vessel rescued a pilot after a forced landing on the starboard bow of escort carrier USS Hollandia. Subsequently, she made three voyages' in support of the buildup on Okinawa, returning from the final passage 7 September 1945. After several weeks of patrol and training maneuvers off Ulithi, she arrived Guam 11 October. The ship made one more stop at Ulithi 22 October, then sailed to Guam with a cargo of spare parts. She departed 5 November for the United States.

=== Decommissioning and fate ===
The destroyer escort arrived San Pedro, Los Angeles, via Pearl Harbor, 23 November 1945, and decommissioned 15 July 1946 at San Diego, California. Entering the reserve fleet, San Diego Group, she was later transferred to Stockton, California. On 15 May 1972 she was struck from the Navy List, and, on 6 September 1973 she was sold for scrapping.

== Military awards ==
No battle stars are listed in Navy records; however, it appears the vessel should have been awarded at least three battle stars based on her campaign record.
