= Jeff Campbell (businessman) =

American businessman

Jeff Campbell is the Brinker Executive In Residence at the L. Robert Payne School of Hospitality & Tourism Management at San Diego State University and the Chairman of The Chairmen's Roundtable, a San Diego–based organization composed of former CEOs and entrepreneurs that engage in free-of-charge mentoring services for local businesses.

== Career ==
Campbell is the former CEO of Burger King and ex-Chairman of the Pillsbury Restaurant Group which, during his tenure, included the Burger King, Steak and Ale, Bennigan's and Godfather's Pizza restaurant chains.

He has also held the posts of Senior Vice President Brand Development for Pepsi-Cola, as well as CEO of the Johnny Rockets and Catalina Restaurant Groups.

== Education ==
Campbell has a B.A. in psychology from Fairfield University, an M.B.A. in marketing from Columbia University and an M.A. in history from the University of Miami.
