= Commvault =

American software company

Commvault Systems, Inc.
- Trade name: Commvault
- Type: Public
- Traded as: Nasdaq: CVLT; S&P 400 component
- Industry: Information technology, software
- Founded: 1996; 30 years ago
- Headquarters: Tinton Falls, New Jersey, U.S.
- Key people: Sanjay Mirchandani (CEO & president)
- Revenue: ▲US$996 million (2025)
- Operating income: ▼US$74 million (2025)
- Net income: ▼US$76 million (2025)
- Total assets: ▲US$1.12 billion (2025)
- Total equity: ▲US$325 million (2025)
- Number of employees: 3,300 (2025)
- Website: commvault.com
- Footnotes; Financials as of March 31, 2025.

Commvault Systems, Inc. is an American publicly traded cybersecurity and data protection software company. Commvault's services are used for data security, as well as cloud and infrastructure management.

Commvault is headquartered in Tinton Falls, New Jersey and has 29 offices globally, including those in Beijing, Shanghai, Mumbai, Dubai, Israel, France, Germany and Brazil.

== History ==
Commvault was originally formed in 1988 as a development group in Bell Labs focused on data management, backup, and recovery; it was later designated a business unit of AT&T Network Systems. After becoming a part of Lucent Technologies, the unit was sold in 1996 and became a corporation, with Scotty R. Neal as CEO.

In March 1998, Bob Hammer joined Commvault as chairman, president and CEO, and Al Bunte joined as vice president and COO. In 2000, the company began releasing products aimed at managing network storage. In March 2006, Commvault filed for an initial public offering, and officially went public later that year as CVLT on NASDAQ. At the end of 2013, the company moved from its space in Oceanport, New Jersey, to its new headquarters at the former Fort Monmouth in Tinton Falls, New Jersey.

On February 5, 2019, Sanjay Mirchandani replaced the retiring Hammer as president and CEO, and Nick Adamo was announced as chairman of the board. Mirchandani joined Commvault from Puppet, an Oregon-based IT automation company, where he served as CEO.

In June 2024, the company received FedRAMP certification for its Commvault Cloud for Government data protection services.

In January 2026, Commvault introduced Commvault Cloud Unified Data Vault, a cloud-native service that offers air-gapped protection and resilience to data stored via the S3 protocol.

== Acquisitions ==
On September 4, 2019, Commvault announced that it would acquire software-defined storage startup Hedvig, with the acquisition valued at $225 million. The acquisition was completed in October 2019.

On February 1, 2022, Commvault announced that it has acquired Israel based cyber security company TrapX.

On April 16, 2024, Commvault announced the acquisition of Appranix, a company specializing in Cyber Recovery in cloud platforms.

In September 2024, Commvault announced the planned acquisition of Clumio, which provides autonomous backup and recovery of cloud data; the acquisition is expected to close in October 2024, be funded with cash on hand, and be immediately accretive to ARR and revenue.

In July 2025, Commvault announced intent to acquire Data and AI Security company Satori Cyber; the acquisition was completed in August 2025.

== Software and services ==
Commvault's main product is a data protection platform that supports cloud, hyperscale, and other environments. It is split into three packages including operational recovery, cyber recovery, and autonomous recovery.

Commvault provides consulting services for customers, advising in the set-up of new data management systems from the architecture design to the implementation and monitoring. In the remote managed service, Commvault manages the software in production for their customers.

== See also ==
- List of S&P 400 companies
