= Ronald Grant (businessman) =

Ronald Grant was the president and chief operating officer of AOL LLC. Grant worked with AOL and its parent company Time Warner since 1997. He came on as president and COO of AOL in 2006.

== Early life ==
Grant earned a bachelor of arts degree in economics from Dartmouth College and an MBA in finance and international business from Columbia Business School.
