= Philip Geier =

American businessman (1935–2019)

- Born: Philip Henry Geier Jr. February 22, 1935; Pontiac, Michigan, U.S.
- Died: June 19, 2019 (aged 84); Palm Beach, Florida, U.S.
- Education: Colgate University; Columbia University
- Occupation: Business executive
- Employer: Interpublic Group of Companies
- Spouses: Faith Power (m. 1961; died 2009) Julie Weindling (m. 2013)
- Children: 2

Philip Henry Geier Jr. (February 22, 1935 – June 19, 2019) was the chairman and chief executive officer of the Interpublic Group of Companies from 1980 to 2000.

== Career ==
Geier joined McCann-Erickson in 1958. During his career, he served as regional director of McCann-Europe and then vice chairman of the parent company, Interpublic in 1975. He then became president and COO two years later, before becoming chairman and CEO. He retired from the company in 2000.

In February 2001, Geier formed The Geier Group to provide consulting/advisory services in the marketing, communications, and venture capitalism areas.

Additionally, Geier was a senior advisor for Lazard Frères & Co., LLC and serves on the board of directors for the following companies: AEA Investors Inc., Fiduciary Trust International, Mettler-Toledo International Inc. and retired from the ones at Alcon Labs Inc. and Foot Locker Inc. Mr. Geier's philanthropic Director/Trustee relationships include Memorial Sloan-Kettering Cancer Center, Save the Children, Autism Speaks, Columbia Business School, the Whitney Museum of American Art, and the International Tennis Hall of Fame.

Geier held a B.A. in economics from Colgate University (1957) and an M.B.A. in marketing and finance from Columbia University (1958).

Geier died in Palm Beach, Florida, on June 19, 2019. He was preceded in death by his first wife Faith, and survived by his second wife Julie Weindling Geier and his two daughters, Jody Howard and Hope Smith, and four grandchildren, Briell Geier Smith, Theodore B. Smith IV, Peter Ashby Howard III, and Jane Gillen Howard.
