= Howard L. Clark Jr. =

Howard L. Clark Jr. (died 2020) was the former chairman and chief executive officer of Shearson Lehman Brothers, from 1990 to 1993. He died in Hobe Sound, Florida, on April 11, 2020

== Early life and career ==
Clark graduated from Boston University in 1967. He received his MBA from Columbia Business School in 1968.

From 1968 to 1981, Clark worked at Paine Webber or its predecessor firms, eventually becoming managing director. Clark joined American Express in 1981. He later became CFO in 1985. From 1990 until 1993, Clark w as chairman and CEO of Shearson Lehman Brothers, Inc. He later was vice chairman of Lehman Brothers from 1993 to 2008, and then as vice chairman at Barclays Capital after 2008. He is a member of the board of directors for Mueller Water Products.
