= Liberty Skis =

American ski manufacturer

Liberty Skis Corporation
- Type: Private
- Industry: Skiing, snowsports, manufacturing
- Founded: Colorado, United States (2003)
- Headquarters: Avon, Colorado, United States
- Key people: James (Jim) E. Satloff, Chairman; Daniel J. Chalfant, CEO
- Website: www.libertyskis.com

Liberty Skis Corporation is one of the ski industry's largest independent ski manufacturers, and a leader in the manufacture of carving, touring, powder, and twin-tip skis, used primarily for a style of skiing known alternately as newschool skiing or freeskiing. Founded in 2003 by James Satloff and Dan Chalfant, Liberty Skis has grown to be one of the largest independent ski manufacturers worldwide, with shops and distributors in the US, Canada, Europe, and Asia.

Liberty Skis Corporation is based in Avon, Colorado, with additional manufacturing and production facilities in Europe (the majority of Liberty Skis' production), North America, the Mediterranean, and Asia.

== Additional information ==
The corporation has sponsored a wide range of events on and off snow in the US and Canada including the Vail International Pondskimming Championships and Spring Back to Vail

The company's ski team has included skiers such as Olympic athletes, Max Moffatt, Teal Harle, X-Games medalist Phil Larose, Phil Bélanger, Ryan Moore, Anton Sponar, Rich Fahey, Kyler Cooley, and Joe Schuster from North America and New Zealand women's national freeskiing champion, Pip Simmonds

Liberty is a sponsor of many events and resorts across North America.
