= Dustin Satloff =

American entrepreneur (born 1993)

Dustin Nathaniel Satloff
- Born: 1993 (age 32–33); New York City, U.S.
- Education: Colby College
- Known for: Photojournalist, Sports Photographer, Entrepreneur

Dustin Satloff (born 1993) is an American photographer / photojournalist and entrepreneur.

== Biography ==
Satloff was born in 1993 in New York City and received his first patent at the age of 10 for a system of using trading cards interactively. At age 13, he founded a company that produces and sells bamboo baseball bats. He has appeared in The New York Times, on National Public Radio, and other programs. Satloff, part of the class of 2011 at the Collegiate School in Manhattan, actively ran his business, SatBats, while a student. In December 2006, Dustin received a design patent for a baseball bat made of two types of bamboo.

Satloff is a professional photographer, specializing in winter sports. Satloff's images have appeared in numerous publications worldwide and have been carried by the Associated Press.
