= Mel Immergut =

American lawyer

- Education: Univ. of Pennsylvania (BA); Columbia Univ. (JD–MBA)
- Occupation: Lawyer
- Political party: Republican
- Spouse: Barbara Lyne
- Awards: Secretary of Defense Medal for Exceptional Public Service

Mel M. Immergut is an American lawyer who has been a partner with Milbank, Tweed, Hadley & McCloy since 1980. From 1995 to 2013, he was the firm's chairman. In 2013, soon after he retired as its chairman, he received Milbank's John J. McCloy Memorial Award. His other positions include one as a lecturer at Columbia Law School, his alma mater, and the former president of the American College of Investment Counsel and The Billfish Foundation. He was interviewed on Full Frontal with Samantha Bee in 2016 regarding his considerable donations to Super PACs for losing Republican U.S. presidential candidates, including Rudy Giuliani and Mitt Romney. In addition to a J.D. degree from Columbia Law School, he also holds an MBA from Columbia University.

Business positions
Preceded by Frank Logan	Chair of the Executive Committee of Milbank, Tweed, Hadley & McCloy; 1995–2013	Succeeded by Scott A. Edelman
