= Amanda Phingbodhipakkiya =

American multidisciplinary artist

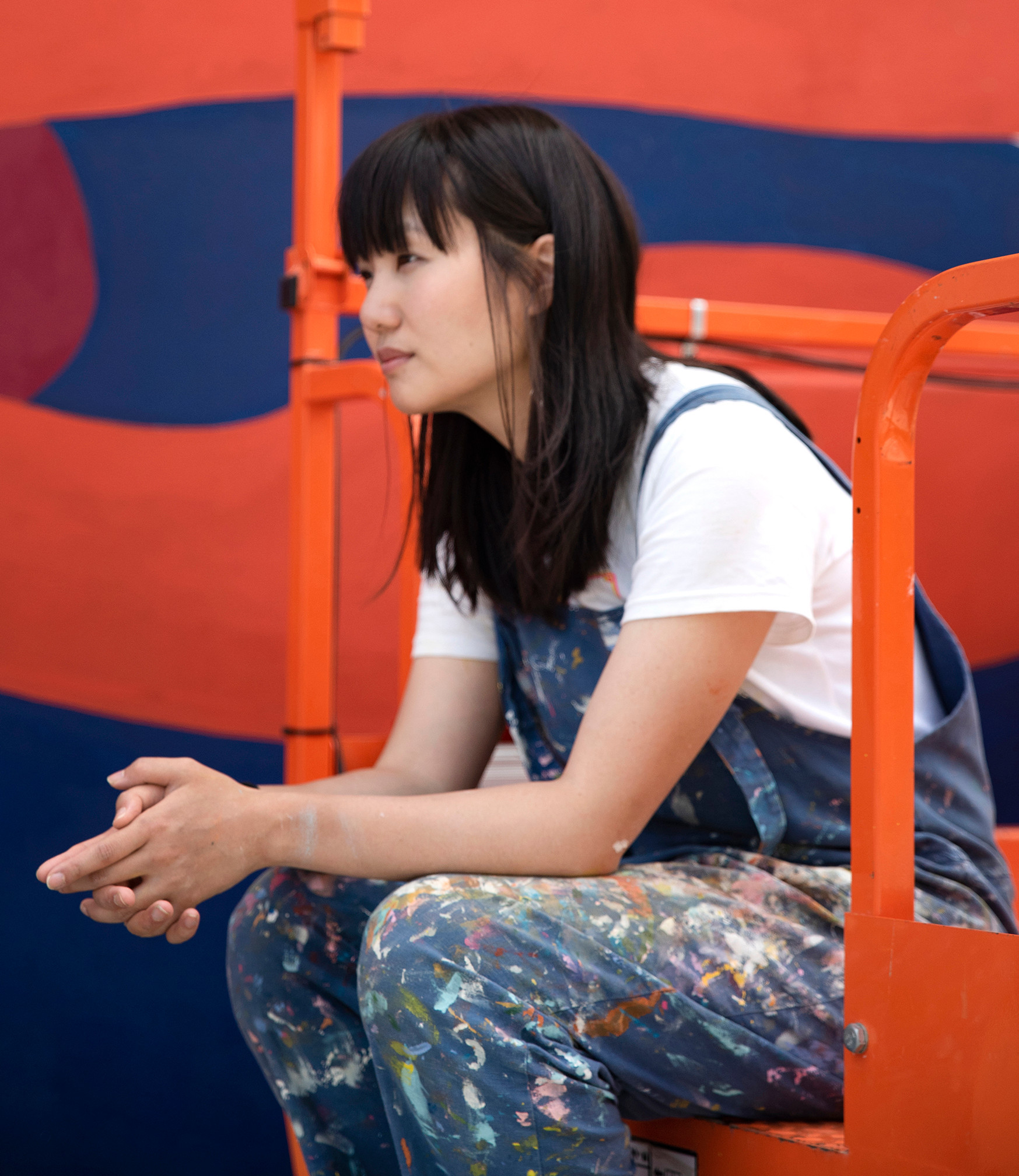
- Born: 1988 (age 37–38); Atlanta, Georgia, US
- Education: Columbia University (BA); Pratt Institute (MA)
- Occupations: Multidisciplinary artist and speaker
- Known for: Beyond Curie, I Still Believe In Our City
- Honours: President's Committee on Arts and Humanities

External videos
- “Amanda Phingbodhipakkiya, The storytelling of science”, TED Residency, 2016.

Amanda Phingbodhipakkiya (born 1988) is a multidisciplinary artist and speaker based in Brooklyn, New York. She is behind the project I Still Believe in Our City and Beyond Curie. Phingbodhipakkiya is a neuroscientist-turned-artist and an advocate of STEM who is known for conveying complex scientific ideas via art. As an artist, Phingbodhipakkiya works with murals, textiles, sculptures, public art campaigns and participatory installations and her art often touches on themes of AAPI, women, STEM, and human rights issues.

== Artistic work ==
Phingbodhipakkiya is a multidisciplinary artist and has utilized augmented reality, interactive installation and biodesign on her projects and exhibits.

Phingbodhipakkiya's art is usually colorful and she considers space to be a vital aspect in her craft. She cites artist Bruno Munari as her inspiration as she is fascinated by how he pairs colors and shapes.

=== Installations ===
From Roots We Carry: In October 2022, Phingbodhipakkiya exhibited “From Roots We Carry”, a participatory installation and ritual made from string, fabric, rattan baskets, and condensed milk cans in collaboration with musicians Dorothy Chan and Lucy Yao of Chromic Duo. The piece explored familial memories and intergenerational legacies and encouraged participants to discuss aspects of their cultural heritage and release pieces of paper representing aspects that no longer served them.

GATHER: A series of monuments and rituals: In the summer of 2022, Phingbodhipakkiya created "GATHER: A series of monuments and rituals" on the outdoor campus of Lincoln Center, to create opportunities for public healing in the face of the COVID-19 pandemic, renewed war & conflict, increasing hate crimes, and climate change.

- Seeds of Hope invited participants to share their hopes and dreams for the future on shades of gold ribbon, which were then tied around the trunks of plane trees on Hearst Plaza. Taken together, the trees were intended to represent beacons of change.
- In Islands in the Sea, the artist installed nine sculptures in the Paul Milstein Reflecting Pool. Visitors engaged in a ritual reminiscent of Loi Krathong, a Thai festival of gratitude, forgiveness, and respect, by floating mirrored wooden blocks on which they grieved recent losses.
- Threads of Joy was a dense canopy of colorful cloth strips strung with stories of joy and belonging, designed to be a place of refuge and togetherness. Participants were invited to contribute their own stories on strips of fabric while small bells chimed above.
- Rivers of Renewal offered visitors the opportunity to shed their anguish by throwing water at a cylindrical tapestry of pigments, causing the colors to run together and drip, symbolizing community catharsis. The form called back to the Thai festival of Songkran, where people of all ages throw water at one another.

Raise Your Voice: For its 10th anniversary the Museum of the City of New York featured 'Raise Your Voice', an immersive mural installation by Phingbodhipakkiya. The piece illustrated the resilience of New Yorkers from Asian American and Pacific Islander (AAPI) communities. It expressed solidarity across activist movements with portraits of Yuri Kochiyama and Malcolm X. Installed near the Activist New York exhibition, Raise Your Voice raises questions and encourages audiences to use their powers for advocacy.

May We Know Our Own Strength: In fall 2021, Phingbodhipakkiya created an installations featuring the voices of anonymous survivors of sexual violence and racism, focused on the intersection of racism, misogyny, and fetishization. Using a web-based system, participants submitted stories of abuse or trauma which were printed via receipt papers, which the artist then crafted into intricate paper sculptures.

Very Asian Feelings: In April 2021, Phingbodhipakkiya completed 'Very Asian Feelings', a mural and installation that explored her personal experience growing up as an Asian American at the Texas Asia Society in Houston. The exhibit was part of a group exhibition called Making Home: Artists and Immigration and featured a mural, canvas reliefs, poetry, found objects, and a textile tapestry.

=== Murals ===
- We Are Tomorrow: In 2023, Phingbodhipakkiya painted the mural in collaboration with the U.S. Ambassador to Thailand, and local students led to a mural at the Thailand U.S. embassy depicting women and non-binary people.
- FINDINGS: Since October 2020, Phingbodhipakkiya has painted FINDINGS murals in Albuquerque, NM, Brooklyn, NY, Denver, CO, Oakland, CA, San Carlos, CA, Seattle, WA, Washington, DC representing topics such as brown dwarf planets, black holes, indigenous ecological knowledge, glaciers, and optics.

=== Public art campaigns ===
- Let's Talk About Us: In February 2023, The San Francisco organization Asian Women's Shelter reached out to collaborate with San Francisco BART to put up artwork for domestic violence awareness campaign.
- I Still Believe In Our City: In November 2020, Phingbodhipakkiya debuted "I Still Believe in Our City", a public art series she developed during her art residency with the NYC Commission on Human Rights. The 45 piece series depicted men and women of Asian and Pacific Islander descent alongside statements like "I did not make you sick" and "We are not your scapegoat". It indicated solidarity with the Black Lives Matter movement by including portraits of Black people. Art appeared across the city: on the large billboard and inside the subway station of Atlantic Terminal in Brooklyn as well in bus shelters, LinkNYC kiosks, and display cases for the Department of Transportation. After the 2021 Atlanta spa shootings, one of the pieces, titled "With Softness and Power", appeared on the cover of the March 29 / April 5, 2021 issue of TIME.

== Early life ==
Phingbodhipakkiya was born and raised in the outskirts of Atlanta to Thai and Indonesian immigrant parents.

== Education and career ==
Phingbodhipakkiya earned a bachelor's degree in neuroscience from Columbia University in 2010. She worked as a researcher at Columbia Medical Center and conducted a study regarding Alzheimer's disease. After obtaining a master's degree in Communication Design from Pratt Institute, she worked as a creative for several companies until she established her own career and went full-time as a multidisciplinary artist.

Phingbodhipakkiya had written and presented content about neuroscience for both Inc. and TED. She also writes occasionally at Medium. Phingbodhipakkiya works as an artist-in-residence for NYC Commission of Human Rights.

== Change in career ==
At a young age, Phingbodhipakkiya associated and questioned the relationship between science and art. As a child, she was fascinated by the aesthetic appeal of the wings of a butterfly, and her mother decided to buy a microscope so she could better observe them. Phingbodhipakkiya then pondered how art, design, and science are interconnected and wondered how they are seen as completely separate and different fields in education.

As an adult, she entered the Ph.D. program at Columbia University, studying neuroscience and working with Yaakov Stern on Alzheimer's research. However, Phingbodhipakkiya eventually became an artist. When asked how she made the jump, Phingbodhipakkiya recalled an incident when she used to work for Columbia Medical Center: a patient once asked her what is her contribution to science. She gave the research paper in response and later regretted it as a failed opportunity to communicate about science, because the average person would not be interested in reading dense scientific papers and therefore would not understand.

Phingbodhipakkiya pondered how to become a better storyteller by expressing complex ideas to a wider audience in a digestible way, and she found herself delving into design.

== Projects ==
- Beyond Curie - a portrait series that highlights unsung women with significant contributions to Science, Technology, Engineering and Mathematics.
- The Leading Strand - A collaboration between scientists and artists to translate and convey scientific breakthroughs into visual art.
- Community of Microbes - in partnership with biologist Anne Madden, the project explores the world of microorganisms through sculpture and interactive AR installation.
- Connective Tissue - Phingbodhipakkiya's solo exhibition features large-scale murals and interactive installations. The project demonstrates the importance and impact of networks and connections—whether biologically, scientifically and/or socially.
- ATOMIC by Design - a fashion line inspired by 118 elements of the periodic table.
- Powers of X (in progress) - it explores the remarkable contributions of women in mathematics and translates it into visual art.
- Particle 17 (in progress) - an interactive and immersive project that aims to convey the world of quantum physics, especially subatomic particles.
- "With Softness and Power" - an illustration selected for the cover of TIME Magazine's March 29, 2021 issue, showing a central figure surrounded by flowers that offers hope as well as a call to action in response to hate crimes against the Asian American and Pacific Islander community in the United States

== Gallery ==
Beyond Curie

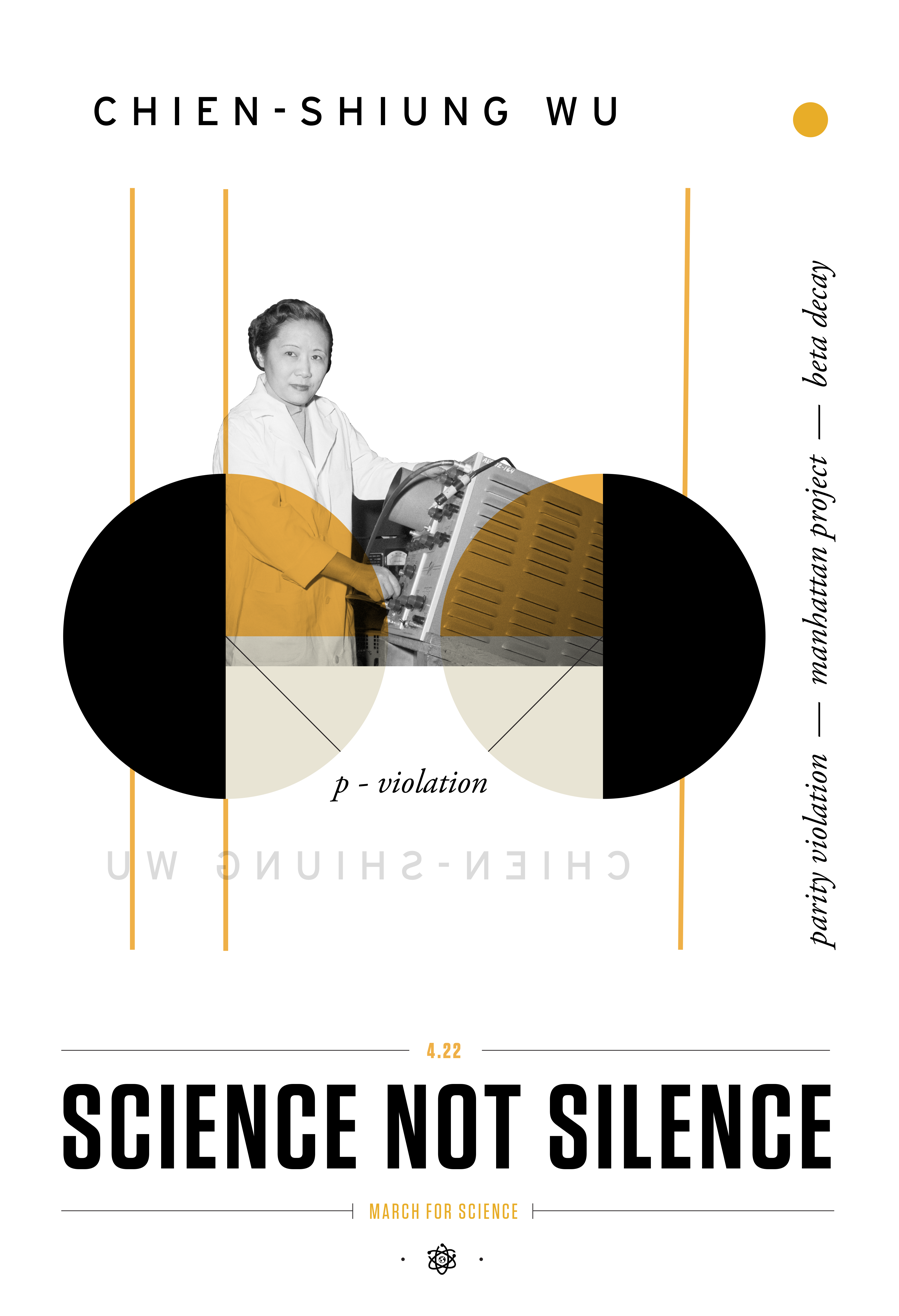
Chien-Shiung Wu - Beyond Curie by Amanda Phingbodhipakkiya, 2017

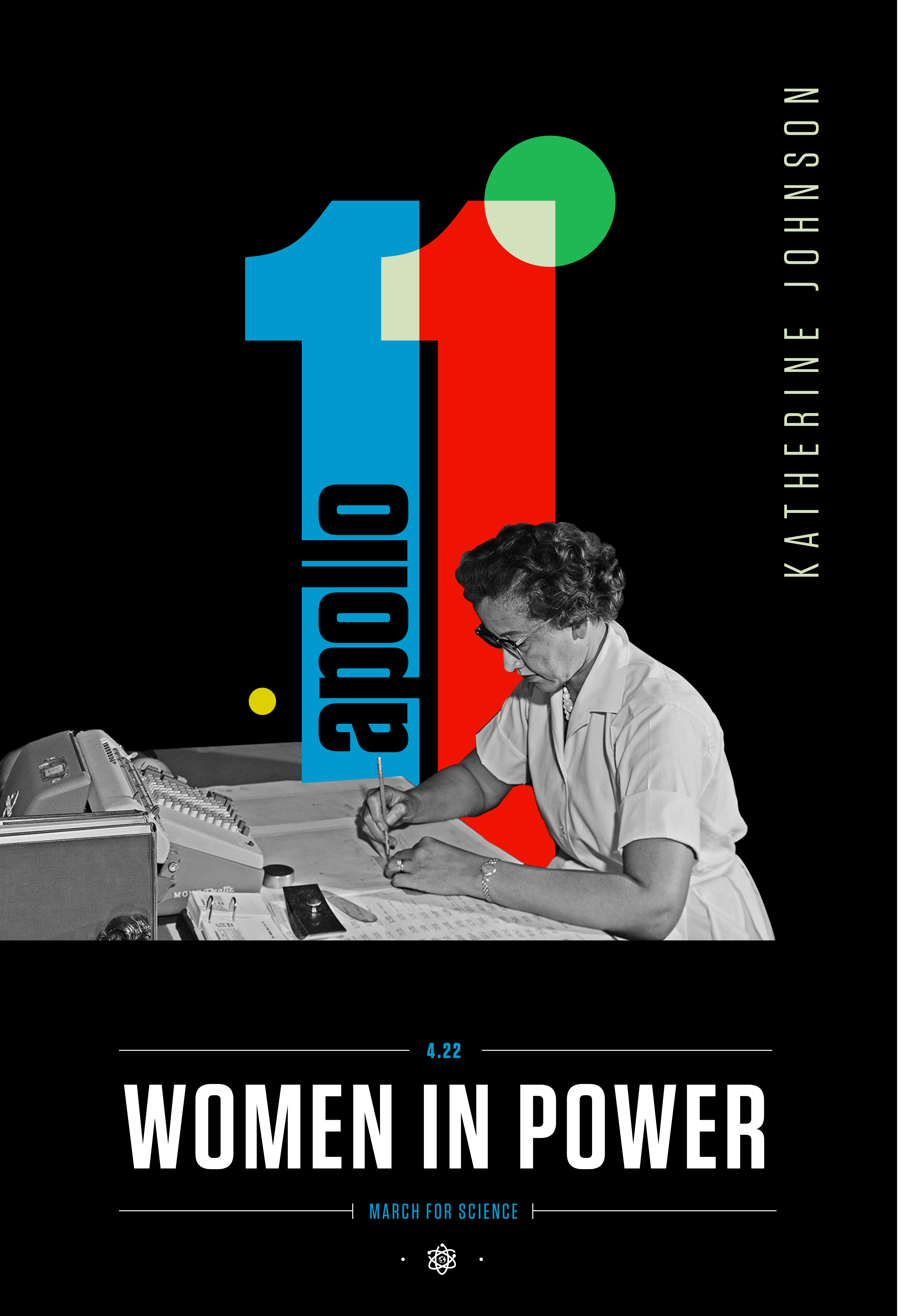
Katherine Johnson - Beyond Curie by Amanda Phingbodhipakkiya, 2017

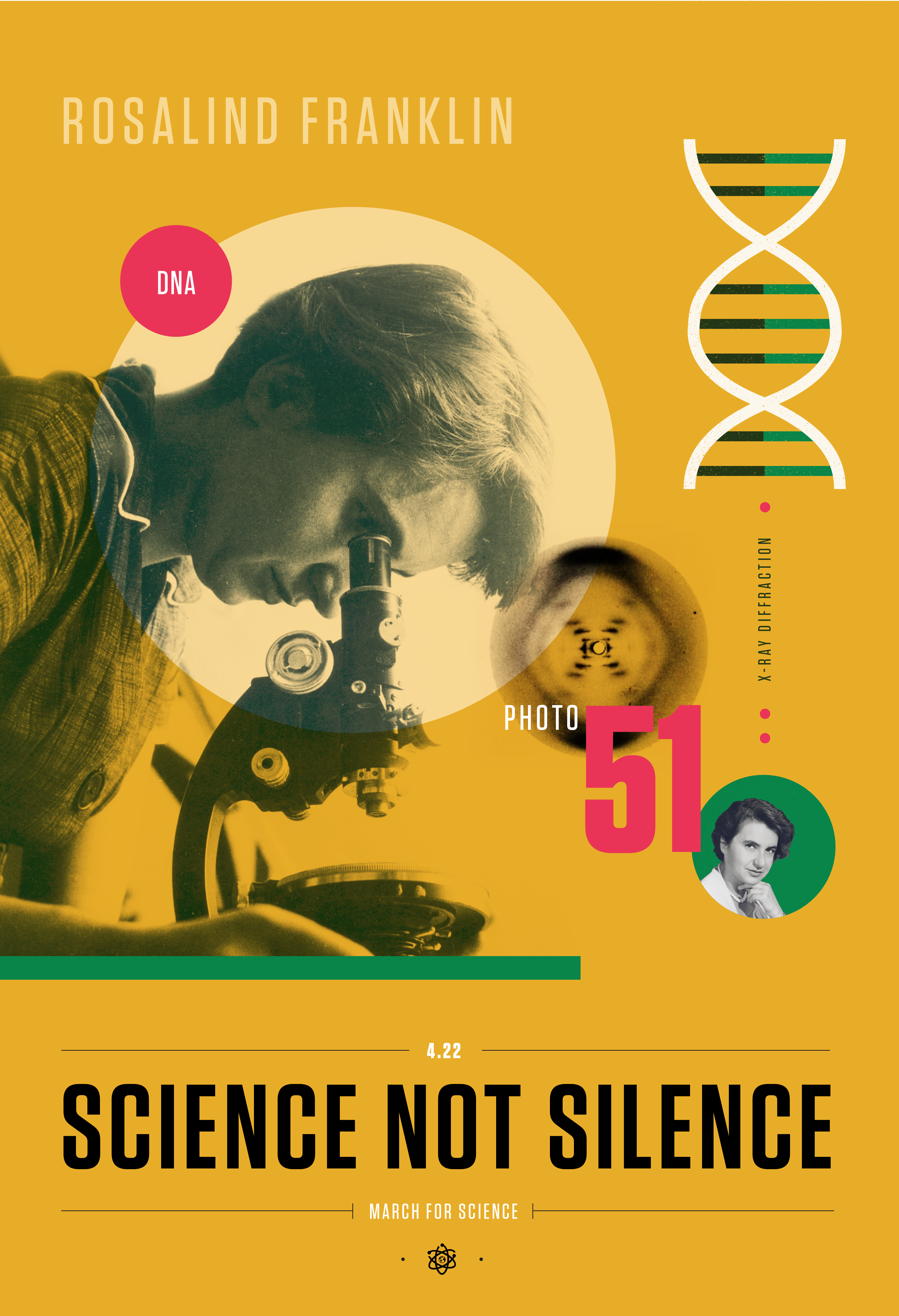
Rosalind Franklin - Beyond Curie by Amanda Phingbodhipakkiya, 2017

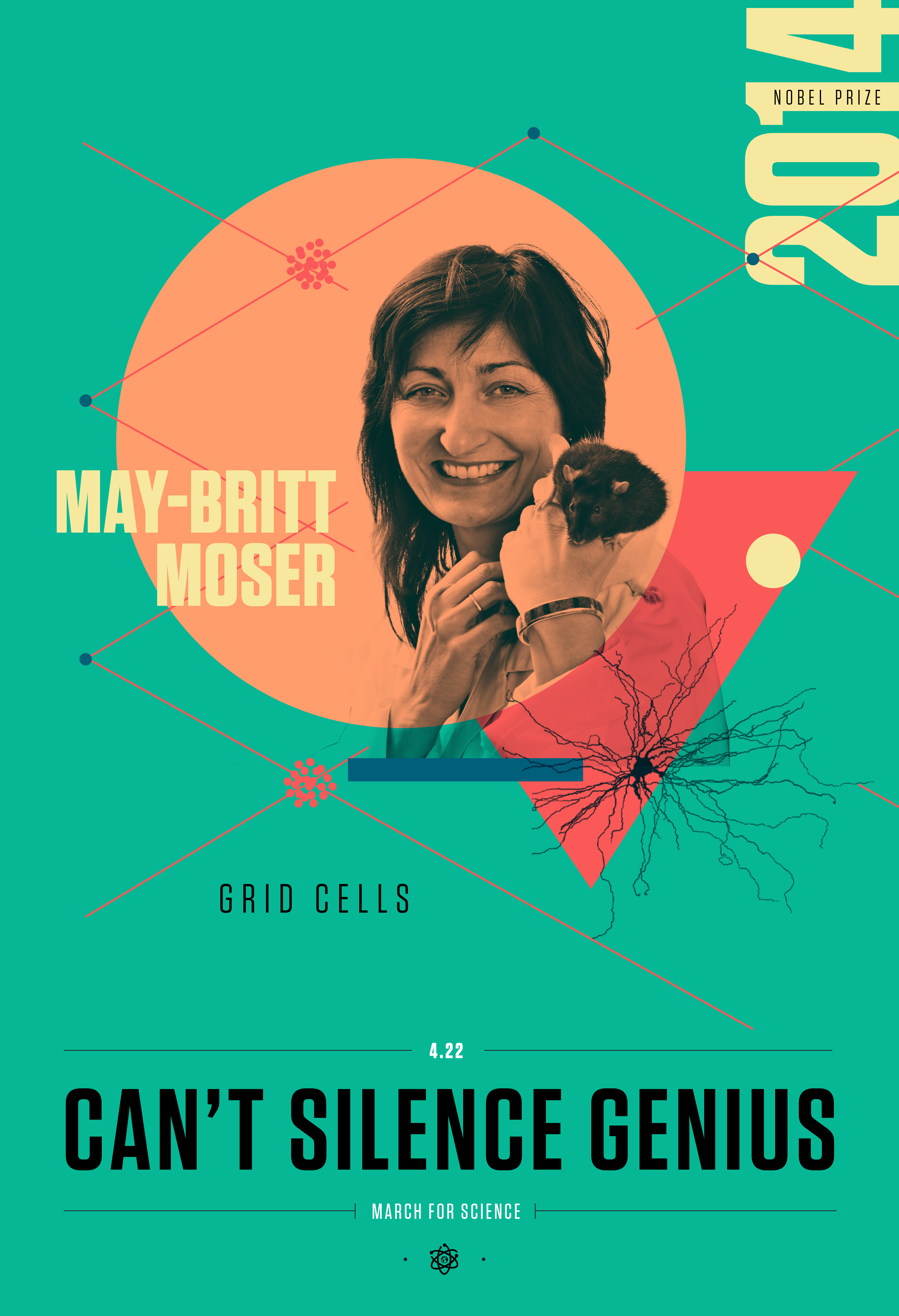
May-Britt Moser - Beyond Curie by Amanda Phingbodhipakkiya, 2017

2020 NYC Public Artists in Residence (PAIR) images from NYC.gov

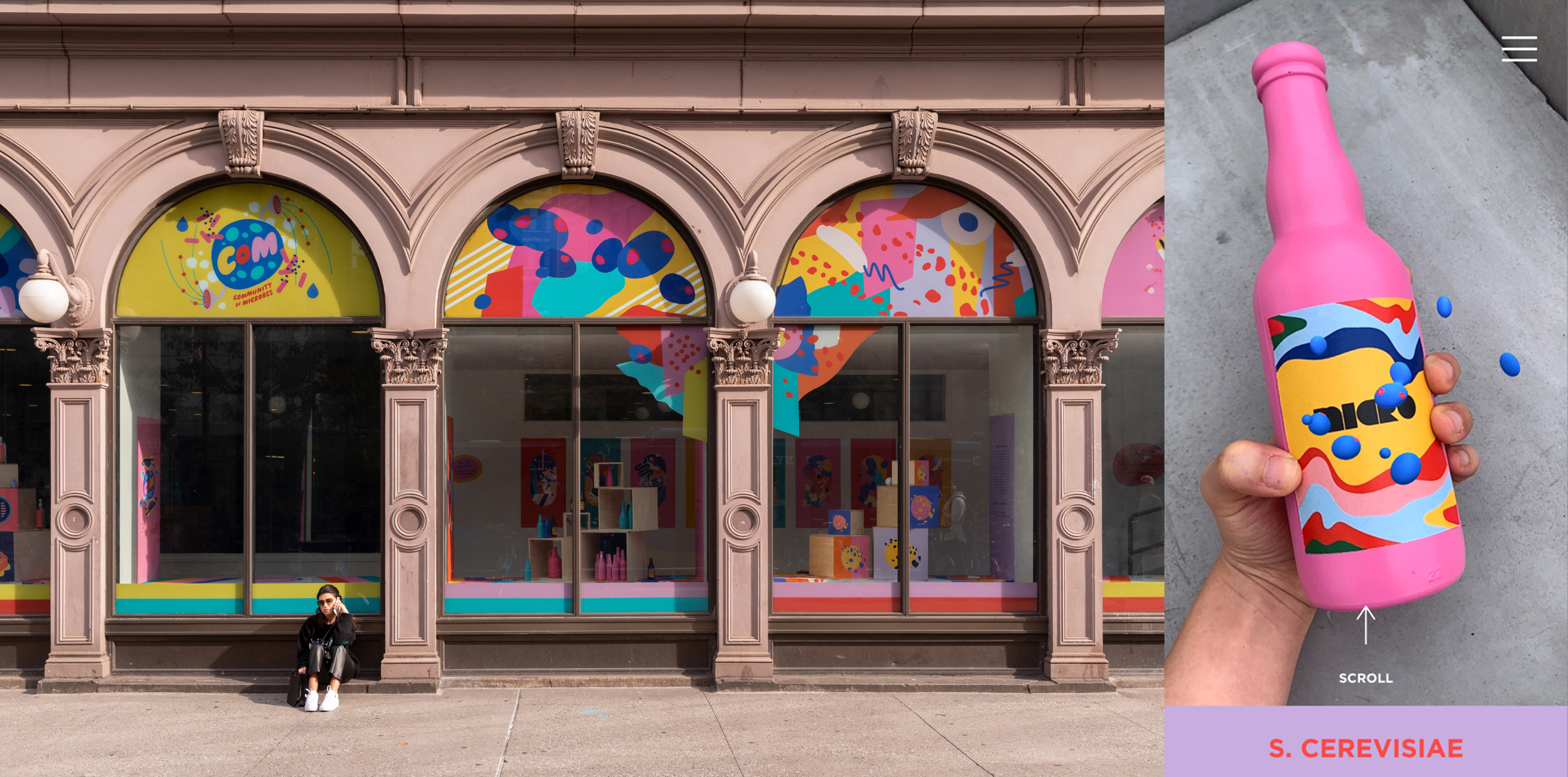

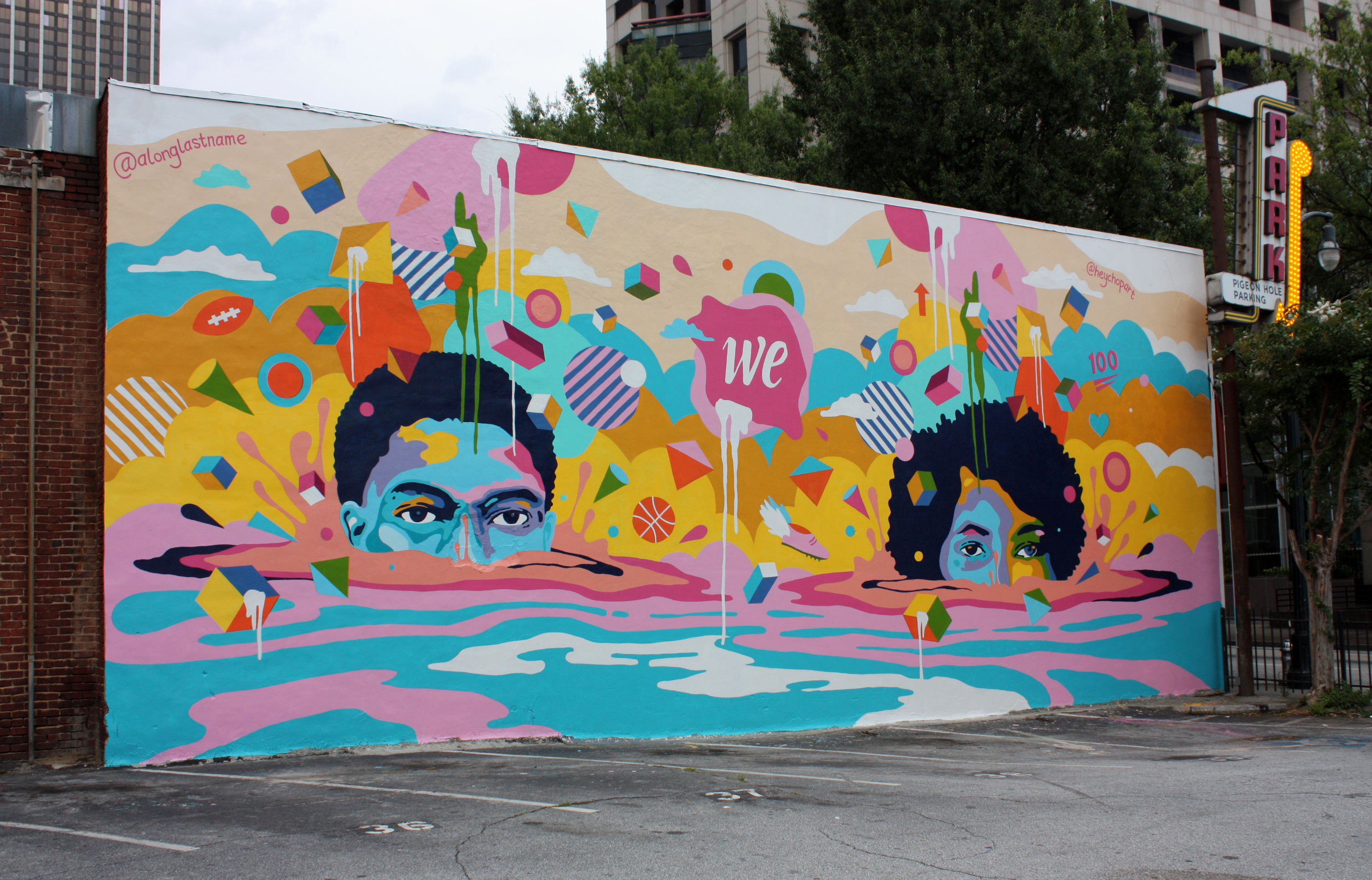

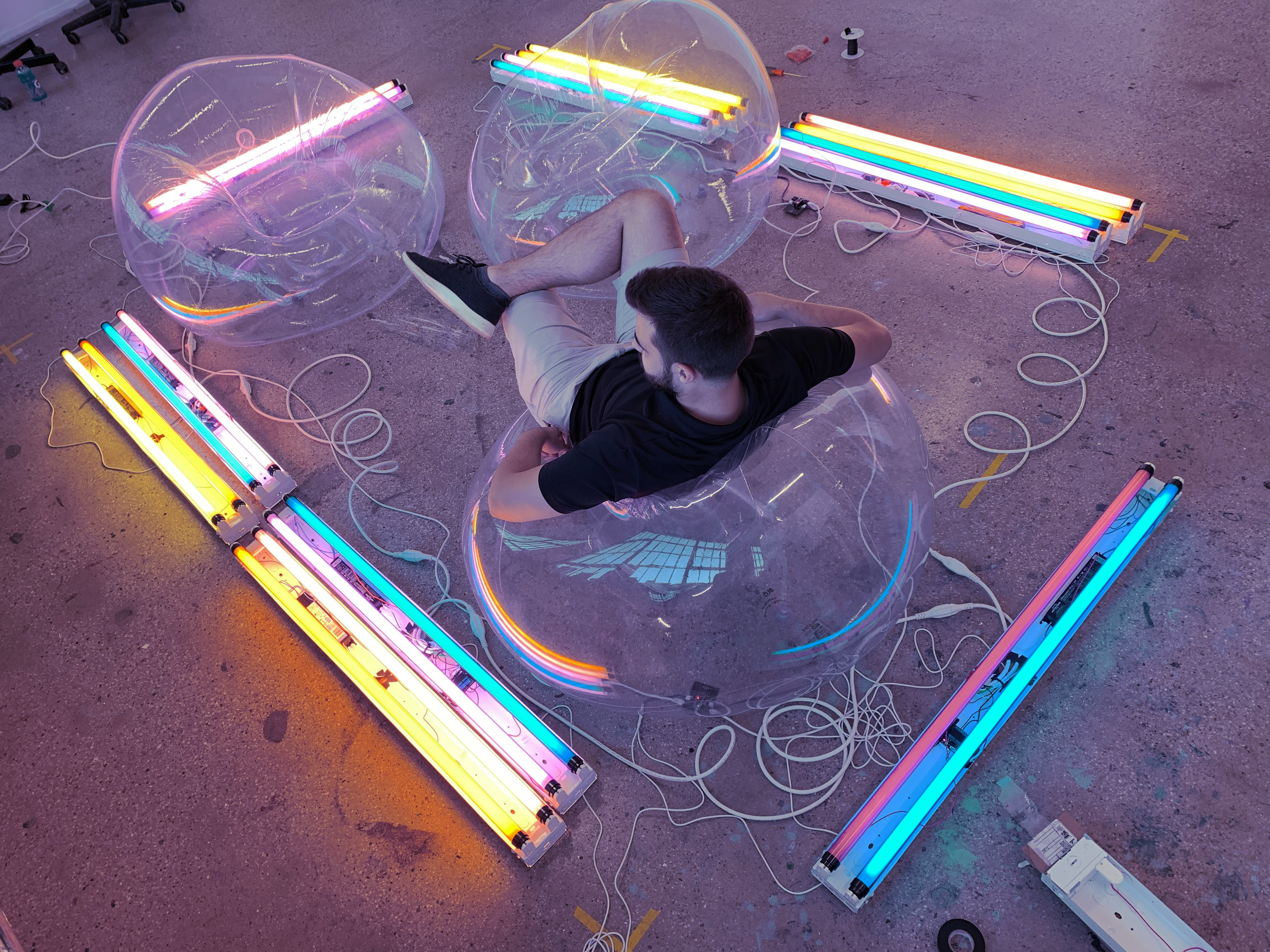

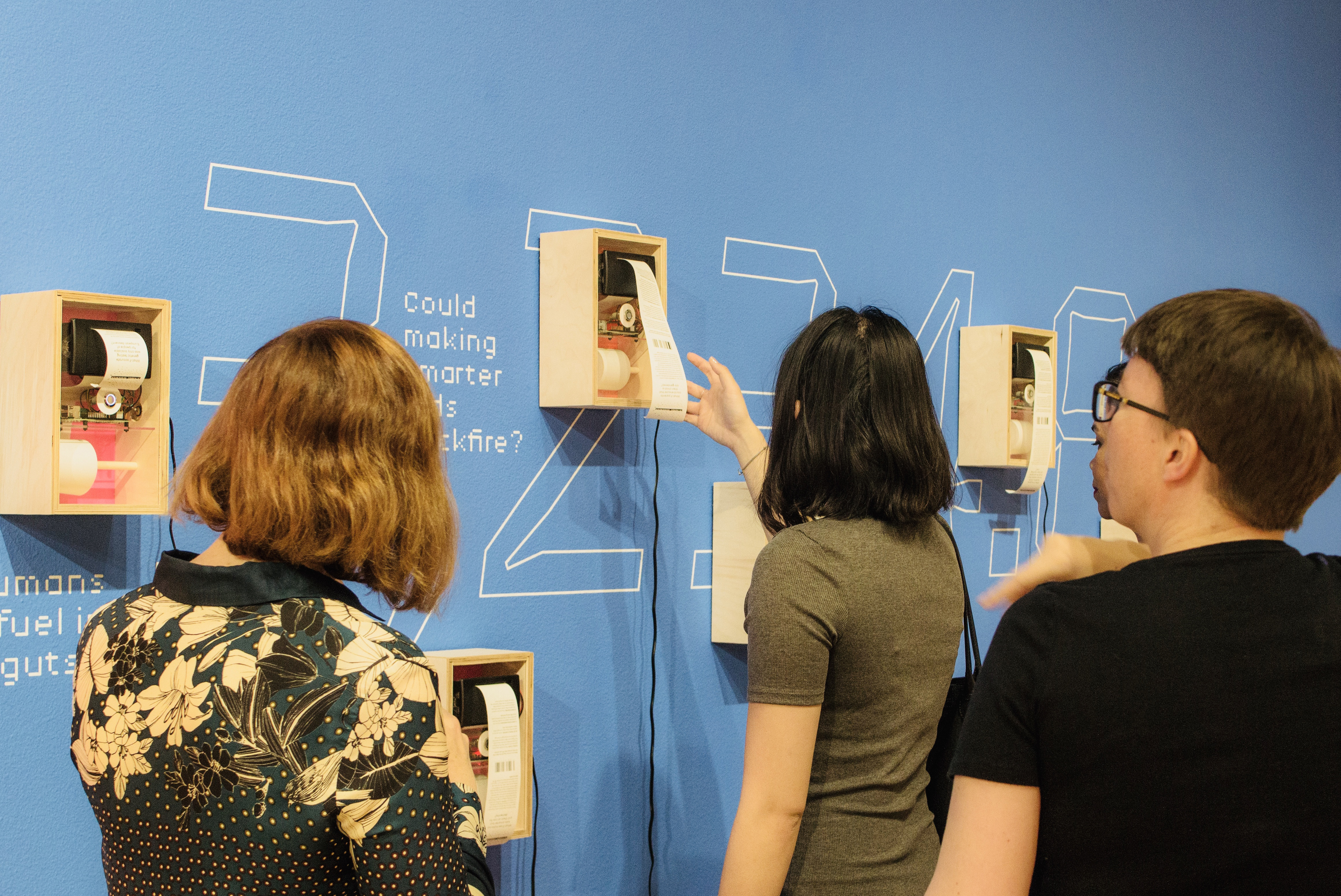

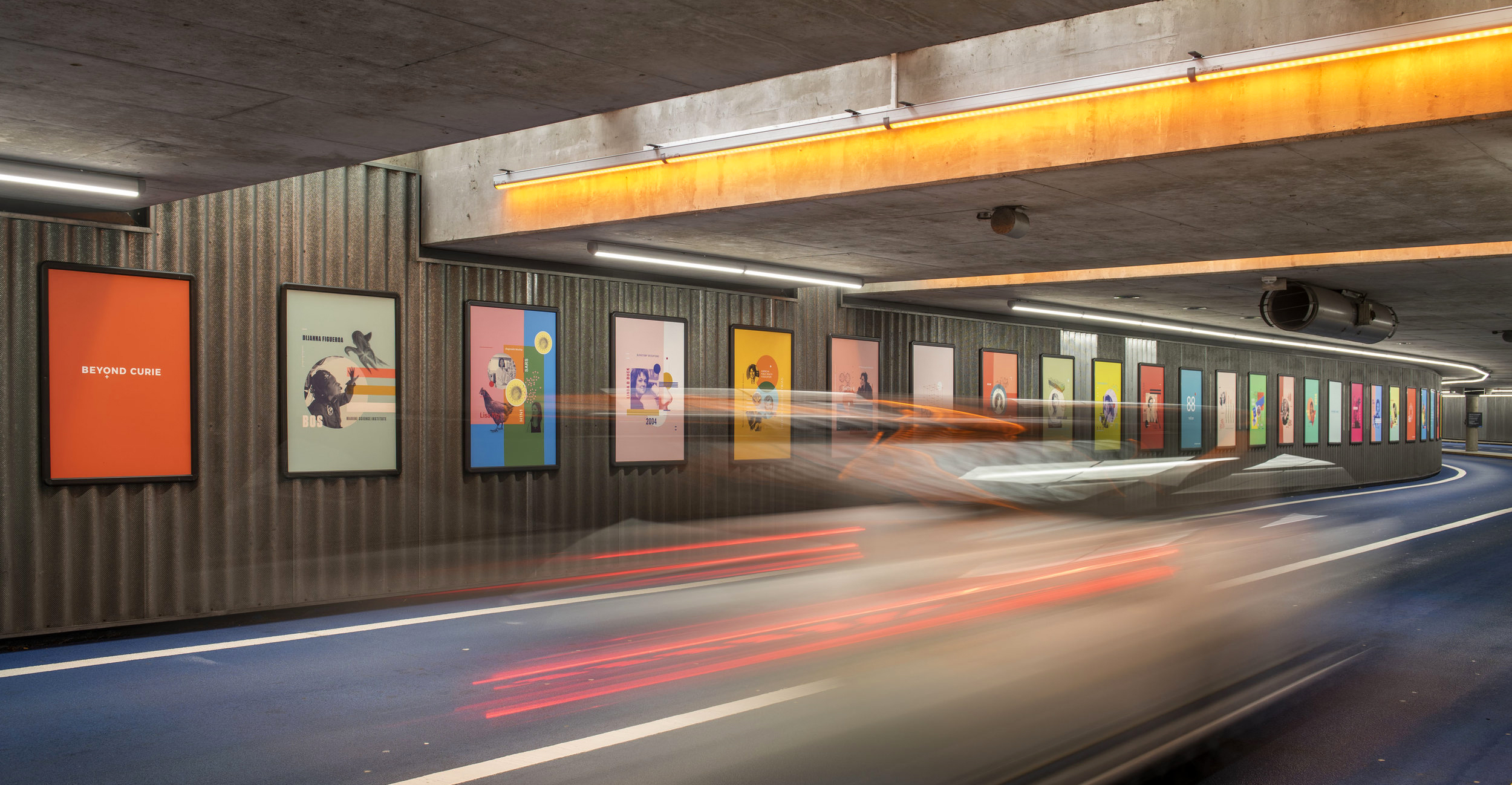

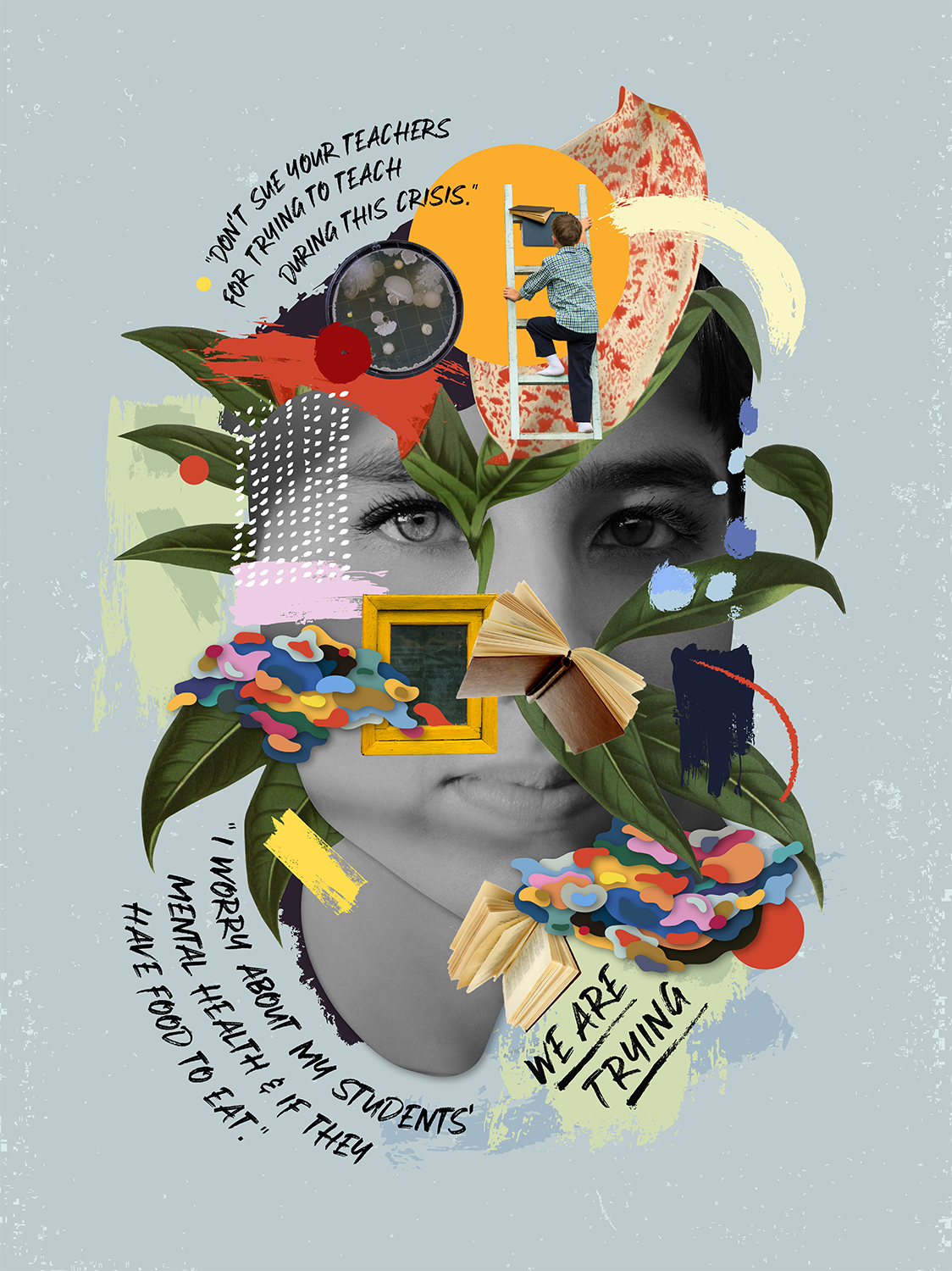

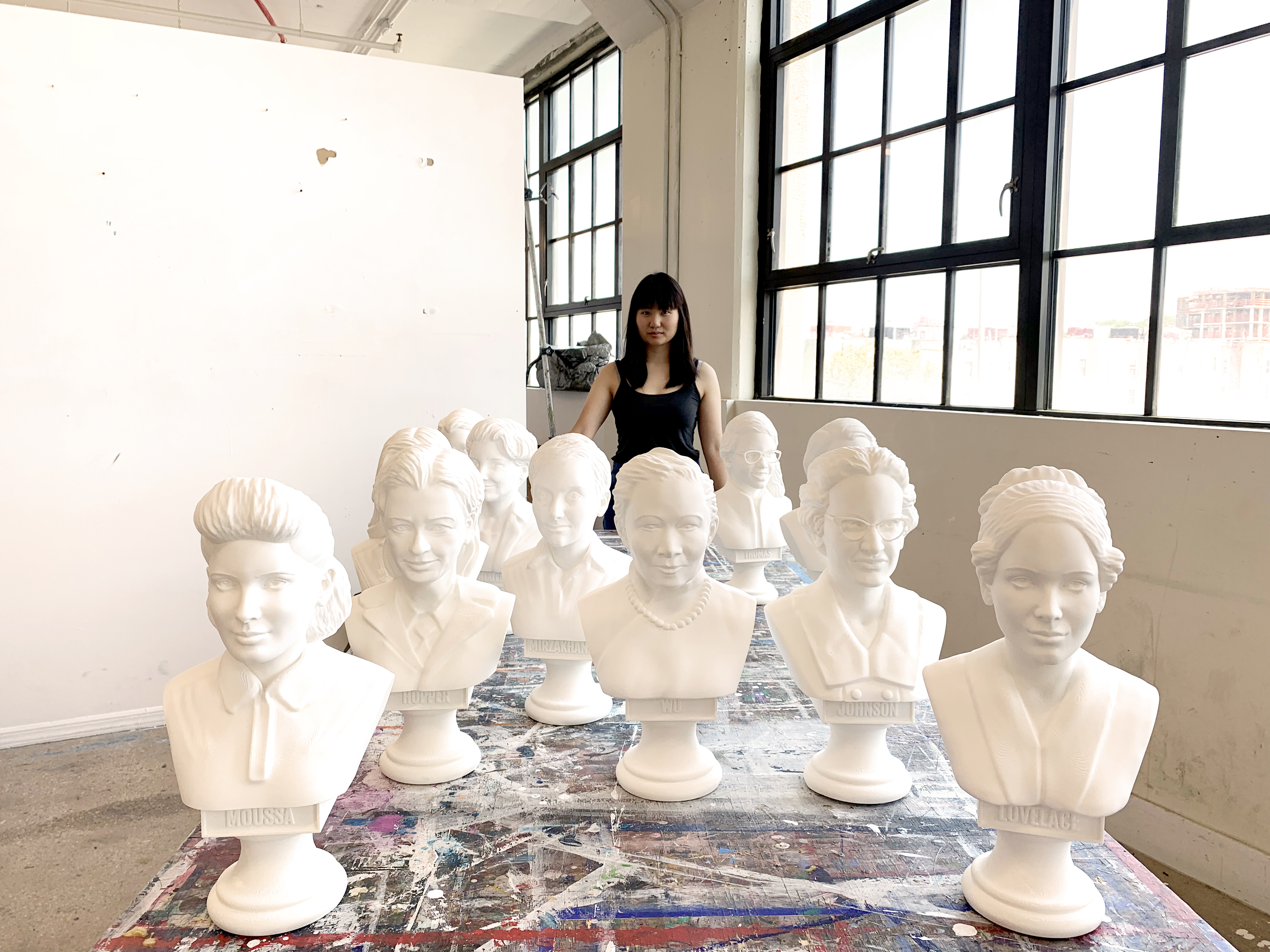

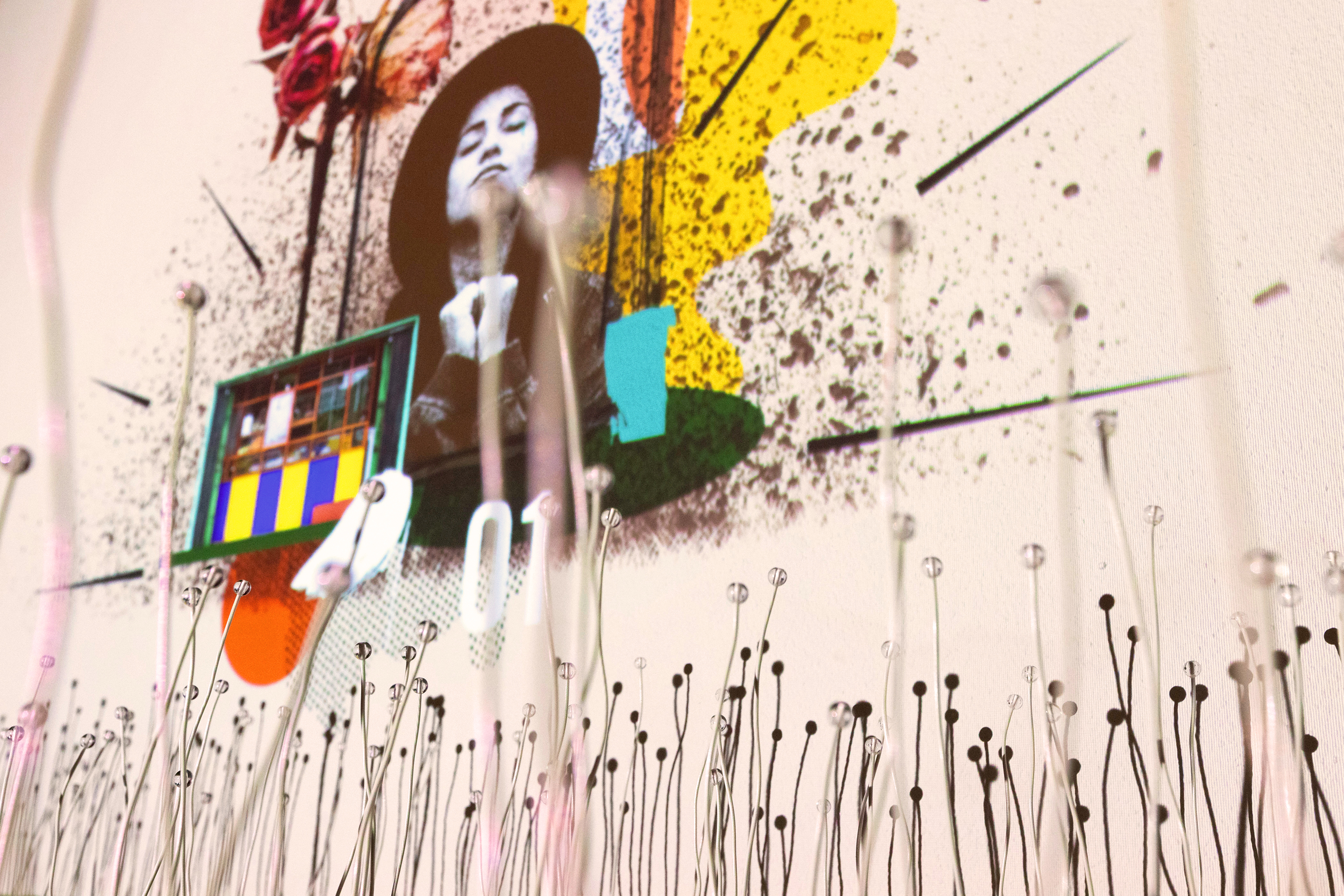

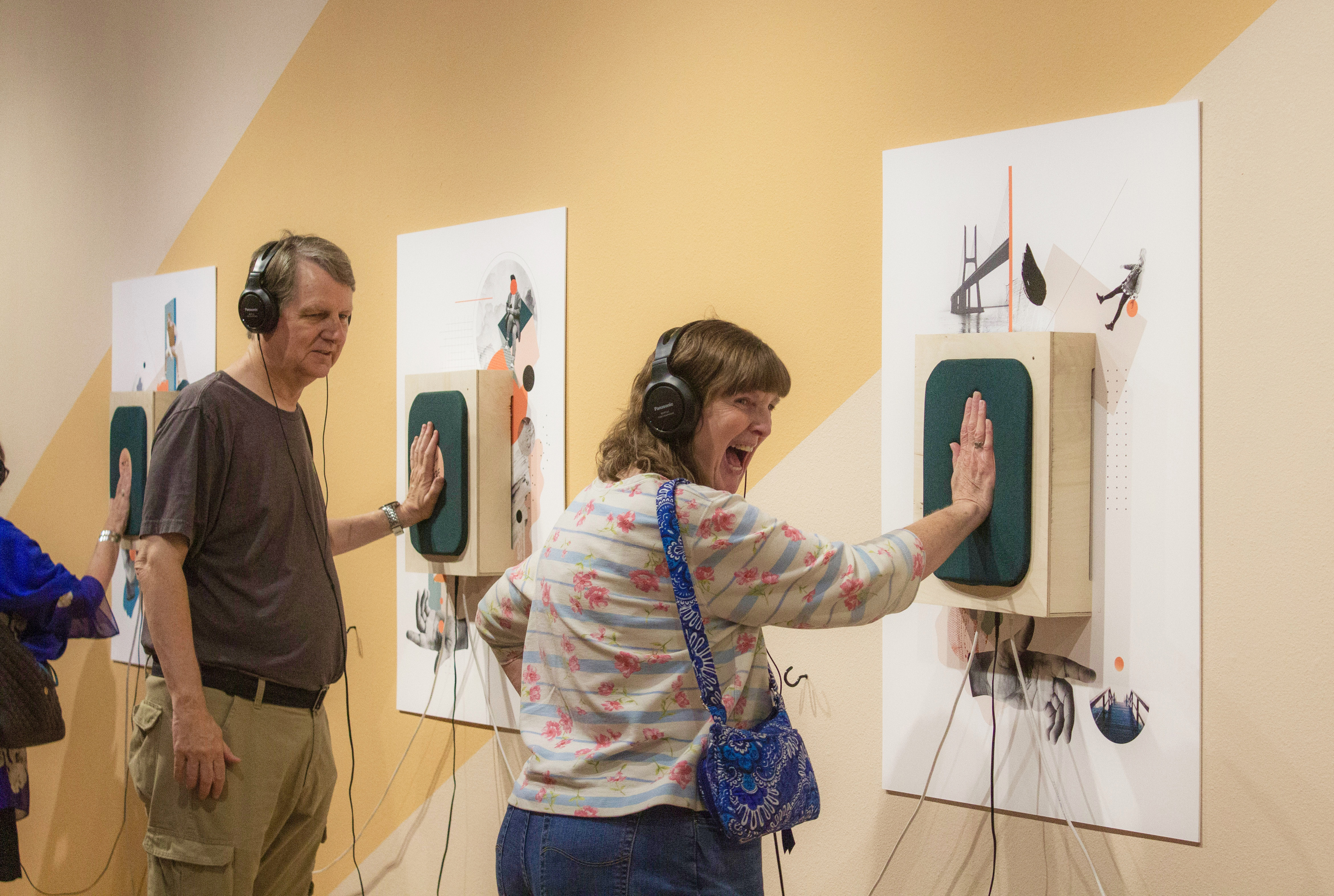

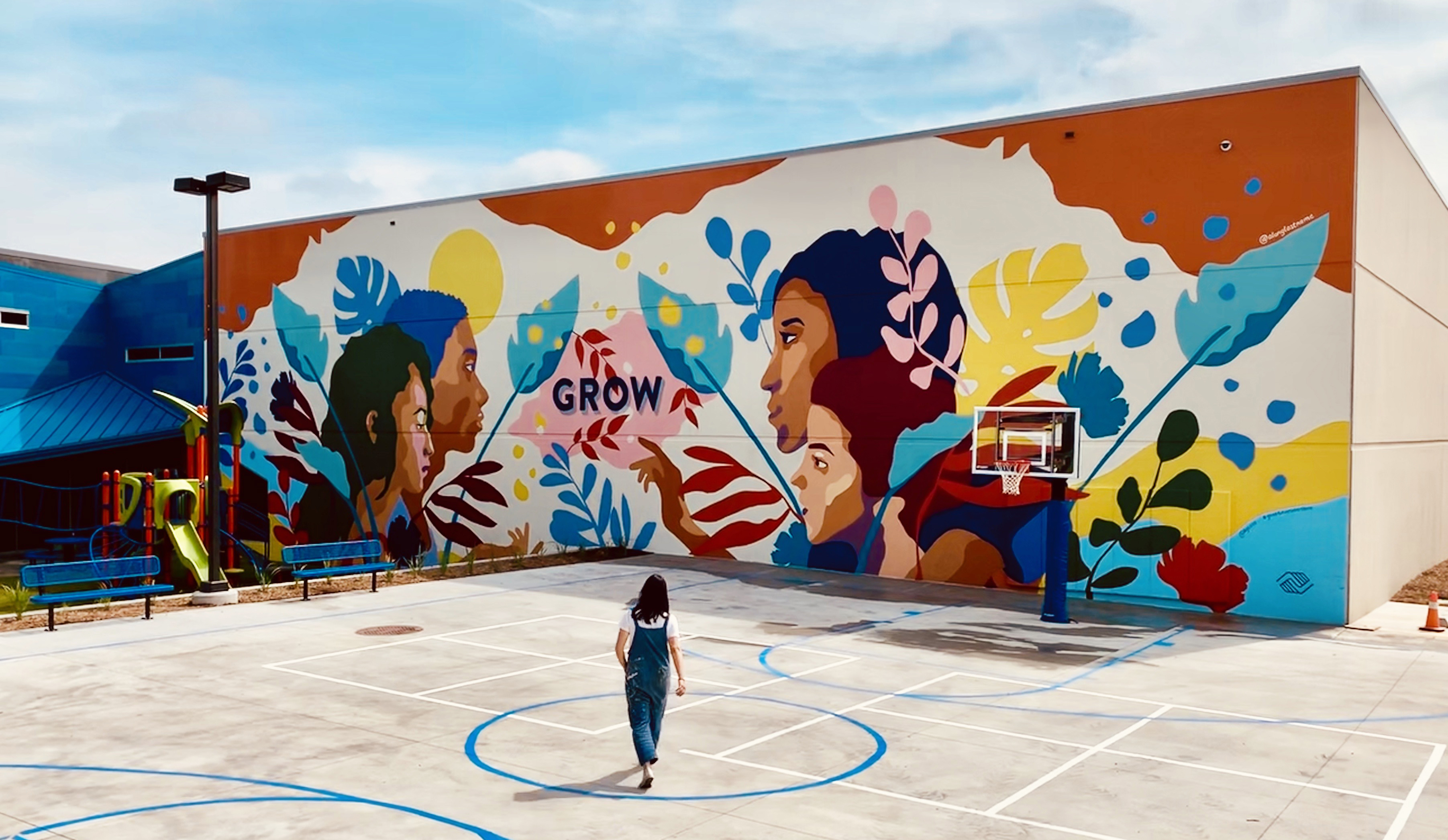

== Awards and recognition ==
- Women to Watch 2024, National Museum of Women in the Arts, 2023
- Selected to appear on TIME's Centennial Cover, TIME, 2023
- Civic Practice Residency, San Francisco Asian Art Museum, 2023
- President's Committee on the Arts and the Humanities, White House Office, 2023
- 12 Groundbreaking Asian Columbians, Columbia University, 2021
- 26 Emerging Asian American Voices, NBC, 2020
- Most Innovative Product, Beyond Curie, Fast Company, 2019
- GOLD International Design Award (Interactive Media), Beyond Curie, 11th IDA, 2018
- WeWork Creator Award, WeWork, 2017
- Red Dot Design Award, Red Dot, 2017
- TED Residency, TED Conferences, 2016
