= Ellen Roche =

Irish biomedical engineer

Ellen Roche is an Irish biomedical engineer and Associate Professor at MIT in the Department of Mechanical Engineering and the Institute of Medical Engineering and Science. She has contributed to heart failure prevention with her inventions, the Harvard Ventricular Assist Device (HarVAD), a soft-robotic sleeve device that goes around the heart, squeezing and twisting it to maintain the heart's functionality, and Therepi, a reservoir that attaches directly to damaged heart tissue.

== Early life and education ==
Originally from Salthill, County Galway, Ellen Roche was 'torn between studying engineering and medicine' after leaving secondary school, so she enrolled in a biomedical engineering programme at National University of Ireland Galway (NUIG). In her third year in college, Roche enrolled in a graduate export orientation programme at Mednova Ltd, and after spending six months at Mednova's office in Galway, she transferred to Abbott Vascular in Redwood City, California, due to its acquisition of Mednova, where she worked for almost four years. Then she worked in Medtronic, Galway, as a research and development engineer. She worked on the development of a replacement aortic valve which was used in humans during her time at Medtronic. In 2004, Roche graduated from NUI Galway with a bachelor's degree in Biomedical Engineering.

She went on to complete a Masters in Bioengineering from Trinity College Dublin in 2010. In August 2011, Roche was one of two Irish recipients of the Fulbright International Science and Technology PhD Award, which awarded her funding to undertake a PhD in Biomedical Engineering at Harvard Medical School. There she met David Mooney, a Professor of Bioengineering, and Conor Walsh, a Professor of Engineering and Applied Sciences. Under the guidance of Mooney in the Mooney Lab and Walsh in the Harvard Biodesign Lab, she performed research on the design, modeling, experimentation, and pre-clinical evaluation of a soft-robotic device that helps patients with heart failure.

Roche returned to NUIG as a post-doctoral research fellow under Peter McHugh, where she used computational methods (finite element analysis) to analyze drug release kinetics from implantable devices.

== Career ==
Roche is currently the W.M Keck Foundation Career Development Professor at the Institute for Medical Engineering and Science and the Department of Mechanical Engineering at the Massachusetts Institute of Technology, where she directs the Therapeutic Technology Design and Development Lab.

== Medical devices ==
=== Harvard ===
The Harvard Biodesign members Roche, Walsh, and Mooney collaborated to create a soft robotic sleeve that mechanically assists the heart in pumping, named the Harvard Ventricular Assist Device (HarVAD). The sleeve is made of silicon with an overall thickness of 16 mm, and is layered with actuators that form rings around the sleeve and a helical spiral from top to bottom. These mechanical rings are tubes that inflate and contract when filled with pressurized air. This enables the sleeve to mechanically twist and compress, synchronizing with a beating heart, augmenting cardiovascular functions weakened by heart failure using a biomimetic approach rather than fully taking over its function. The sleeve does not directly contact blood, which reduces the risk of clotting and eliminates the need for a patient to take potentially dangerous blood thinner medications.

=== TissueSil ===
Roche and her team developed a robotic myocardium – the muscular outer tissue of the heart – and wrapped it around a pig's inner heart like "bubble wrap" using a tissue silicone adhesive they designed called TissueSil. With further tissue engineering, Roche believes there could be biorobotic hybrid hearts used as artificial hearts which could combat the global competitive heart transplant lists.

=== Therepi ===
Roche also developed a device named 'Therepi' that attaches directly to a damaged heart and acts as a reservoir for drugs or cells that can be refilled multiple times from a port under the skin. Therepi allows for drugs to be delivered by administering localized, non-invasive therapies as many times as required. The device's reservoir can be implanted on the heart in a single surgical procedure, minimizing the amount of surgeries required.

=== Double-sided medical tape ===
In 2019, Roche was a named author on the invention of a dry double-sided tape that can be used for the adhesion of wet tissue and devices. The tape can be used in surgery to bind wet surfaces within seconds to heal wounds or implant medical devices. In tests on rats and pigs, the tape was used to bind lungs and intestines back together within 5 seconds.

== Speaker ==
In 2017 Roche spoke at Inspirefest on the topic of soft robotics, particularly her work on a soft robotic sleeve that could help failing hearts to keep pumping. In 2018, Roche gave the Keynote Speech at Impact, a technology conference in Krakow, where she discussed soft robotics.

== Honors and awards ==
- Presidential Early Career Award for Scientists and Engineers, 2025
- Wellcome Trust Seed Award in Science, 2016–2017
- American Heart Association Pre-Doctoral Award, 2014–2015
- Fulbright International Science and Technology Award, 2011–2014
- First Place Award, 3-in-5 Competition, Design of Medical Devices, 2013
- First Place Award, International Student Design Showcase, Design of Medical Devices, 2013
- Overall Winner, Mimics Engineering on Anatomy for Cardiovascular Applications, 2013
- Ryan Hanley Prize for best final year project, NUIGalway, 2004
- Medtronic Prize for best final year project, NUIGalway, 2004
