= Vivek Paul =

Indian-American business executive

- Born: Vivek Paul; 1958 (age 67–68); New Delhi, India
- Citizenship: American
- Education: BITS Pilani (B. E.); University of Massachusetts Amherst (MBA)
- Children: 3

Vivek Paul (born 1958) is an Indian-American business executive and entrepreneur. He served as the vice-chairman of Wipro and CEO of its flagship business, Wipro Technologies. He also worked as a senior executive at General Electric, private equity investor at TPG, and a strategy consultant at Bain. He is the founder of KineticGlue, a tech startup that was successfully sold to BMC. He has served on several boards, including the California Chamber of Commerce, Electronic Arts, Freedom House, and on the advisory council of the Federal Reserve Bank of San Francisco.

Dataquest India did a survey of Indian IT's Most Powerful Women, and eight out of the ten had been direct reports of MPaul at some point in their careers. Eleven of Paul's direct reports from Wipro and GE went on to become public company CEO's.

== Early life ==
Vivek Paul was born in New Delhi, India. He did schooling in Bombay Scottish and St. Columba's School, New Delhi. He received Bachelor of Engineering degree from BITS Pilani and MBA from University of Massachusetts Amherst.

== Career ==
Paul began his business career as an analyst in international finance and M&A at PepsiCo.

Paul worked in strategy consulting at Bain & Co. for four years

=== GE ===
In 1990, Paul was part of the founding team of WiproGE Medical Systems. He became its CEO in 1993. The joint venture started as a sales and service arm, went on to manufacturing, and then design and build of medical equipment, becoming India's largest exporter of high value electronics goods. Paul was then asked to lead GE's worldwide CT scanner business. Paul reorganized operations across its China, Japan and US operations, and launched GE as the first major multi-detector CT provider, with the launch of the Lightspeed in 1999.. The work in complex product development became a foundation of "Design For Six Sigma". In one of the books about Jack Welch, Paul was cited as top five All Star CEOs from GE.

=== Wipro ===
In 1999, Paul was asked to become vice chairman of Wipro and CEO of its outsourcing unit. Wipro was a $150-million company when Vivek Paul took over, and it had all the tendencies of a small, traditional company. Paul has been credited with creating a global business and for much of Wipro's growth into a multibillion-dollar company. On 19 October 2000, Wipro was listed on the New York Stock Exchange. Paul was recognized as a Global Business Influential by TIME in 2004, as among the best global managers by BusinessWeek in 2004, and among the world's most respected CEO's by Barron's in 2005.

=== TPG Capital ===
In June 2005, Paul joined private equity firm, TPG Capital, as an investing partner spanning various fund classes, from buyout to Asia to venture capital. He went on to be a founding partner of TPG Growth, a fund focused on growth capital for midsize companies. He resigned from TPG in December 2008.

=== Kinetic Glue ===
Founded KineticGlue, a cloud-based enterprise social media application in 2008. Sold company to BMC in 2013.

=== Stanford ===
Paul co-founded the Microbiome Alliance at Stanford, and was the driving force behind the first Microbiome Symposium at Stanford in 2014. The ninth annual Stanford Microbiome Symposium was held in September 2022, at which time Paul announced the end of his involvement with that effort. Paul also co-chaired the Biodesign program of 2014–2015.

=== Electronic Arts ===
Paul served on the board of Electronic Arts from 2005 to 2019, and was chair of its CEO selection committee in 2013.

Paul has served on the advisory council of the Federal Reserve Bank of San Francisco, on the board of the California Chamber of Commerce, on the board of the U.S.-India Business Council, and on the Senate of BITS Pilani.

== Acknowledgments ==
- Ranked among the best managers in the world by BusinessWeek in 2003.
- Among the top global business influentials by Time magazine in 2004.
- Among the top 30 most respected global CEOs by Barron's in 2005.
- Among the top 5 CEO's by Jack Welch in his book 4E's of Leadership in 2005
- Design for Six Sigma pioneer by Mikel Harry in his book, Six Sigma in 2006
