= Bio-based material =

Material made from substances derived from living organisms

A bio-based material is a material made, either wholly or partially, from substances derived from living (or once-living) organisms, such as plants, animals, enzymes, and microorganisms, including bacteria, fungi and yeast.

Due to their main characteristics of being renewable and to their ability to store carbon over their growth, recent years assisted to their upsurge as a valid alternative compared to more traditional materials in view of climate mitigation.

In European context, more specifically, European Union, which has set 2050 as a target date to reach climate neutrality, is trying to implement, among other measures, the production and utilization of bio-based materials in many diverse sectors. Indeed, several European regulations, such as the European Industrial Strategy, the EU Biotechnology and Biomanufacturing Initiative and the Circular Action Plan, emphasize bio-materials. These regulations aim to support innovation, investment, and market adoption of bio-materials while enhancing the transition towards a circular economy where resources are used more efficiently. In this regard, the application of bio-based materials has been already tested on several market segments, ranging from the production of chemicals, to packaging and textiles, till the fabrication of full construction components.

Bio-based materials can differ depending on the origin of the biomass they're mostly constituted. Moreover, they can be differently manufactured, resulting in either simple or more complex engineered bio-products, which can be used for many applications. Among processed materials, it is possible to distinguish between bio-based polymers, bio-based plastics, bio-based chemical fibres, bio-based leather, bio-based rubber, bio-based coatings, bio-based material additives, bio-based composites. Unprocessed materials, instead, may be called biotic material.

== Bio-based, organic, and bio-degradable materials ==
=== Bio-based materials vs. biodegradable materials ===
Bio-based materials are often biodegradable, but this is not always the case.

By definition, biodegradable materials are formed or organic compounds which can thus be broken down by living organisms, such as bacteria, fungi, or water molds, and reabsorbed by the natural environment.

Whether a material is biodegradable is determined by its chemical structure, not the origin of the material from which it is made. Indeed, the sustainability benefits of drop-in biobased plastics occur at the beginning of the material life cycle, but still, when manufactured, their structure is identical to their fossil-based counterparts. Therefore, these plastics, known as 'drop-ins', are not biodegradable, and should be recycled in existing recycling systems.

In this regard, biodegradability does not support circularity unless biodegradable materials are recovered and processed by a system that can either recapture or upgrade their value. Ensuring a proper infrastructure for these materials to remain in the material management system, for instance through industrial composting or anaerobic digestion, is thus considered to be essential.

=== Bio-based materials vs. organic materials ===
Similarly, bio-based materials are not necessarily organic, as the term "bio-based" simply indicates the material origin. The term "organic" instead refers to the cultivation of plants or the keeping of the animals in compliance with the requirements of the European organic farming standard. Consequently, a bio-product can be both "bio-based" and "organic," but it is not necessarily so.

=== Bio-based materials vs. fossil-based materials ===
It is not given that bio-based materials always perform better than fossil-based materials.

Their environmental performance depends on a series of factors, related to the sourced material and to the amount and typology of manufacturing processes the raw natural material need to undergo to become a bio-product.

One of the main factors influencing the sustainability of bio-materials is land consumption, land competition for food production and soil depletion. In this regard, in the European context many studies have been conducted to analyze the actual availability of land for the production of bio-materials, while bio-residues and wastes coming from either the agro-industrial and forestry sectors are gaining interest.

Moreover, manufacturing processes needed for the production of competitive bio-alternatives to fossil-based products might lead to higher energy consumptions or to "linear", non-circular, products. Therefore, it is recommended to maintain a critical mindset based on Life Cycle Assessment analysis, as some bio-products could require either extra material or processing to ensure the same quality, resulting necessarily in more energy consumption.

== See also ==
- Bio-based building materials
