= Lisa Ng =

Viral immunologist

Lisa Ng is a Singaporean viral immunologist. In 2008, she became the first Singaporean and the first woman to win the ASEAN Young Scientist and Technologist Award for her work in developing diagnostic kits for Avian Influenza and Sars-CoV. She has been featured as part of the "Beyond Curie" project as a pioneer in viral immunology, as well as being inducted into the Singapore Women's Hall of Fame. Her ongoing research includes endemic tropical diseases and Sars-CoV-19.

== Early life ==
Lisa Fong Poh Ng was born as the eldest of two daughters to a father who is a contractor and a mother who is a teacher. In 1989, she enrolled in a biotechnology course at the Singapore Polytechnic after her completion of GCE O levels at Marymount Convent. Her family considered polytechnic studies to be second-rate and did not believe it would help her get into a university afterwards. Lisa pursued a course that would allow her to involve herself in scientific research immediately. She completed her polytechnic studies with good grades but was unable to secure a place at the National University of Singapore afterwards.

== Education ==
In 1995, Lisa graduated with a Bachelor of Science (Hons) in Biochemistry from the University of Manchester Institute of Science and Technology in the United Kingdom. In 2002, she earned her PhD in Molecular Virology from the National University of Singapore. That same year, she joined the Genome Institute of Singapore (GIS) as a postdoctoral fellow where she contributed the development of a framework to deliver broad-range capability for preparedness for viral diseases including influenza, SARS, hepatitis, and vector-borne diseases.

== Career ==
She is working at the Singapore Immunology Network (SIgN) where she is the Senior Principal Investigator of a project undertaking research on immunology of viral infections that are epidemic or highly endemic in the tropical region. These include chikungunya virus, dengue virus, Zika virus and other related alpha- and flavi-viruses. She has previously developed diagnostic kits for detecting Avian Influenza H5N1 and Sars. She currently holds the position of Executive Director of the A*STAR Graduate Academy, Senior Principal Investigator at the Singapore Immunology Network, Adjunct Associate Professor at the National University of Singapore, and Professor and Chair of Viral Immunology at the Institute of Infection and Global Health at the University of Liverpool, UK. Her ongoing research includes that of the viral immunology of Sars-CoV-19. Her team's discovery in Sars-CoV-19 is centered around neutralizing antibodies that are able to prevent the virus from infecting and replicating inside human cells.

== Awards ==
- 2005: “Most Inspiring Woman” at the Great Women of Our Time Awards for Science and Technology
- 2007: Biovisions Next Fellows Award
- 2008: ASEAN Young Scientist and Technologist Award
- 2013: Junior Chamber International Ten Outstanding Young Persons of the World Singapore 2013 Scientific and/or Technological Development Award
- 2013: A*STAR Most Inspiring Mentor Award
- 2016: Public Administration Medal (Bronze)
