= Beyond Curie =

Poster series of women in STEM

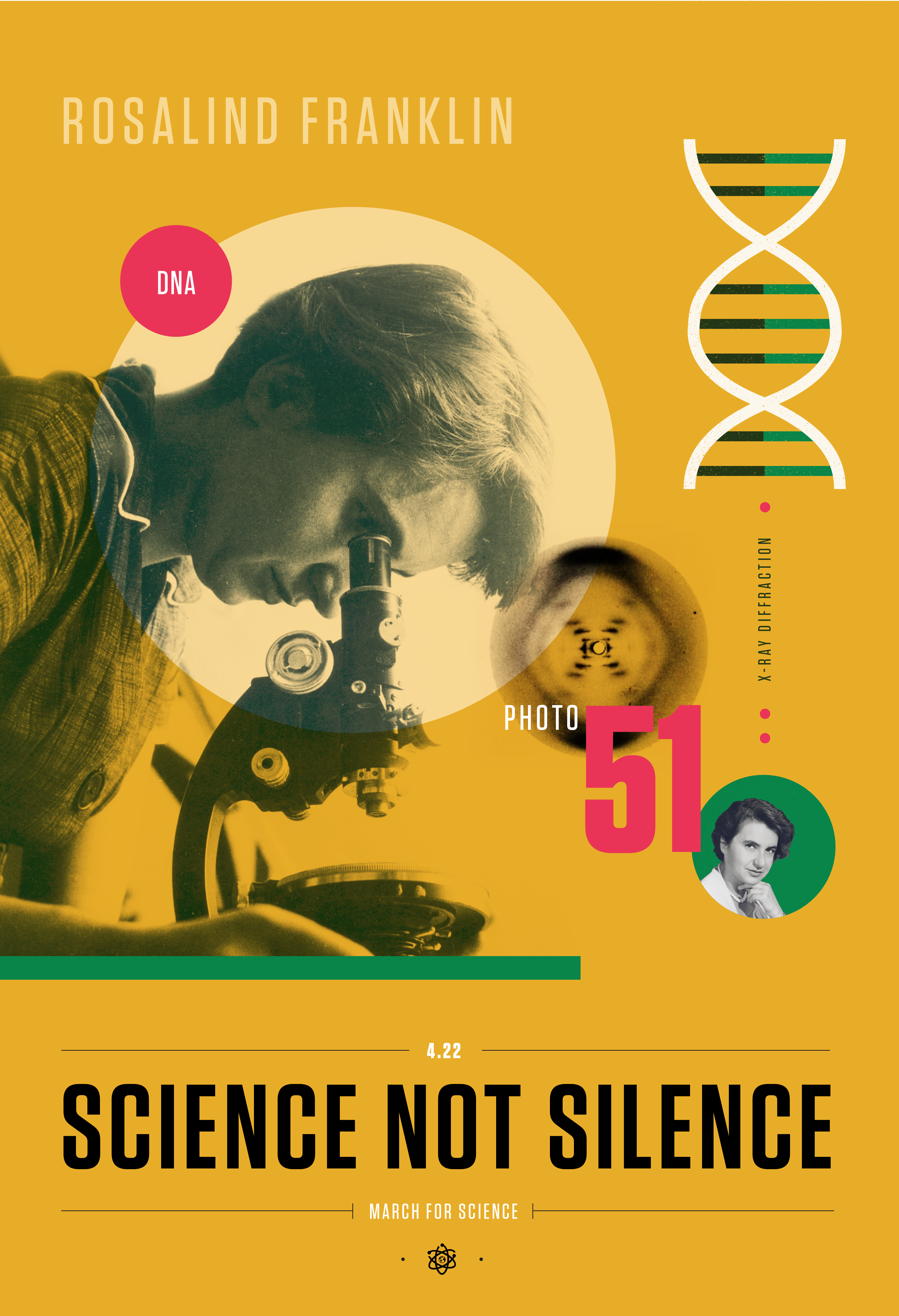
- Rosalind Franklin from the Beyond Curie March for Science poster series
- Artist: Amanda Phingbodhipakkiya
- Year: January 28, 2017
- Medium: digital illustration
- Website: www.beyondcurie.com

Beyond Curie is a portrait series of women who have made significant contributions in STEM fields. As of November 2018, the series features 42 women, including all 18 female Nobel Prize winners in Physics, Chemistry, and Physiology or Medicine.

The series was created by Amanda Phingbodhipakkiya, a former neuroscience researcher and designer who named the project after two-time Nobel prize winner Marie Curie, with the goal of highlighting other important female scientists who are less well known. Beyond Curie has raised $44,172 from 856 backers across two Kickstarter campaigns.

== Public exhibits ==
Beyond Curie has been on display in an exhibit at the North Carolina Museum of Natural Sciences since March 24, 2017.

Phingbodhipakkiya worked with the March for Science organizers to make special Beyond Curie posters that could be freely downloaded and brought to a rally or protest.

In partnership with Outside, Phingbodhipakkiya developed five portraits specifically focused on women whose work focused on health and the environment.

Phingbodhipakkiya presented some of the Beyond Curie portraits at TEDWomen 2017, where she said the project was "about finding your heroes" and shared stories of female scientists who only learned about some of the historical figures of the series after encountering Beyond Curie.

In September and November 2018, the Beyond Curie posters were displayed in a highway tunnel in Breda, Netherlands by 3 Second Gallery.

== Featured women ==
As of December 2018, the women featured in the series are:

1. Lise Meitner
2. Katherine Johnson
3. Chien-Shiung Wu
4. Margaret Ann Bulkley
5. Ada Lovelace
6. Mae Jemison
7. Rita Levi-Montalcini
8. Barbara McClintock
9. Maryam Mirzakhani
10. Rosalyn Sussman Yalow
11. Françoise Barré-Sinoussi
12. Carol Greider
13. Elizabeth Blackburn
14. Grace Hopper
15. May-Britt Moser
16. Linda Buck
17. Youyou Tu
18. Rosalind Franklin
19. Jocelyn Bell Burnell
20. Christiane Nüsslein-Volhard
21. Vera Rubin
22. Ada Yonath
23. Sylvia Earle
24. Rachel Carson
25. Gertrude B. Elion
26. Mary Golda Ross
27. Irène Joliot-Curie
28. Dorothy Crowfoot Hodgkin
29. Farida Bedwei
30. Lisa Ng
31. Mildred Dresselhaus
32. Maria Goeppert-Mayer
33. Valerie Thomas
34. Helen Rodriguez-Trias
35. Esther Lederberg
36. Inez Fung
37. Florence Bascom
38. Dijanna Figueroa
39. Kalpana Chawla
40. Rose E. Frisch
41. Frances Arnold
42. Donna Strickland

== Augmented reality ==
In additional to graphic illustration, Phingbodhipakkiya worked with technologists at NC State to develop 3D augmented reality animations for a number of the women, including McClintock, Greider, Blackburn, Joliot-Curie, Johnson, Buck, Ng, Jemison, Mirzakhani, Franklin, Rubin, Dresselhaus, Goeppert-Mayer, Tu, Yalow. The augmented reality animations can be seen using a free mobile app called "Beyond Curie" available on Google Play and App Store.

== Recognition ==
Beyond Curie has won several awards, including 1st Place in Multimedia / Interactive Media in the 2017 International Design Awards and the Red Dot 2017 design award.

Phingbodhipakkiya was invited to speak about the project to the employees at Google in November 2018. The project was featured in a blog post by venture capitalist and Kickstarter board member Fred Wilson.
