= Yaakov Stern =

American cognitive neuroscientist

Yaakov Stern is an American cognitive neuroscientist, professor of neuropsychology at Columbia University. His major contribution is the concept of cognitive reserve, which helps to explain differential susceptibility to age- or disease-related brain changes.

== Early life ==
Stern has an undergraduate degree in psychology from Touro College, and a doctorate in psychology from the Graduate Center of the City University of New York. He joined the faculty at Columbia University after completing his doctorate. He now is a Florence Irving professor of neuropsychology and chief of the Cognitive Neuroscience Division of the Neurology department.

== Cognitive reserve ==
Stern's major contribution is the concept of cognitive reserve, which helps to explain differential susceptibility to age- or disease-related brain changes. In 2002 he published his first systematic treatment of the concept. Stern's work in cognitive reserve is the most cited in the list of 300 papers in Alzheimer's Disease research compiled by the Journal of Alzheimer's Disease and has been quoted in news articles.

In 1992, he demonstrated that when patients with Alzheimer's disease are matched for clinical severity, those with higher education had more extensive neurodegeneration, indicating that they could cope more successfully with the underlying pathology. He was one of the first to use prospective incidence studies to demonstrate that individuals with higher educational or occupational attainment, or who engage in more late life leisure activities have a reduced risk of developing Alzheimer's. He was the first to observe that patients with higher reserve had a more rapid rate of decline. Much of his later work has focused on the potential neural basis of cognitive reserve using imaging studies.

Stern has authored or co-authored and published over 700 articles in academic journals. His H index according to Google scholar is over 190. He edited a book on cognitive reserve.

== Other research ==
Stern's earliest work focused on identifying cognitive changes in nondemented patients with idiopathic Parkinson's disease, which helped identify the cognitive role of the basal ganglia when it was widely believed to have a role only in motor function. He validated these observations in patients with MPTP-induced Parkinson's.

In the long-standing Predictors study, Stern has been working to clarify the heterogeneity of the course of Alzheimer's disease. He identified a set of disease features that are associated with more rapid decline, and created prediction algorithms for disease course.

Stern directs the Reference Ability Neural Network (RANN) study, which is examining the neural basis for key cognitive domains in aging.
