= Bio-based building materials =

Possible solution to carbon emissions in construction

Bio-based building materials incorporate biomass, which is derived from renewable materials of biological origin such as plants (normally co-products from the agro-industrial and forestry sector), animals, enzymes, and microorganisms, including bacteria, fungi, and yeast.

Today bio-based materials can represent a possible key-strategy to address the significant environmental impact of the construction sector, which accounts for around 40% of global carbon emissions.

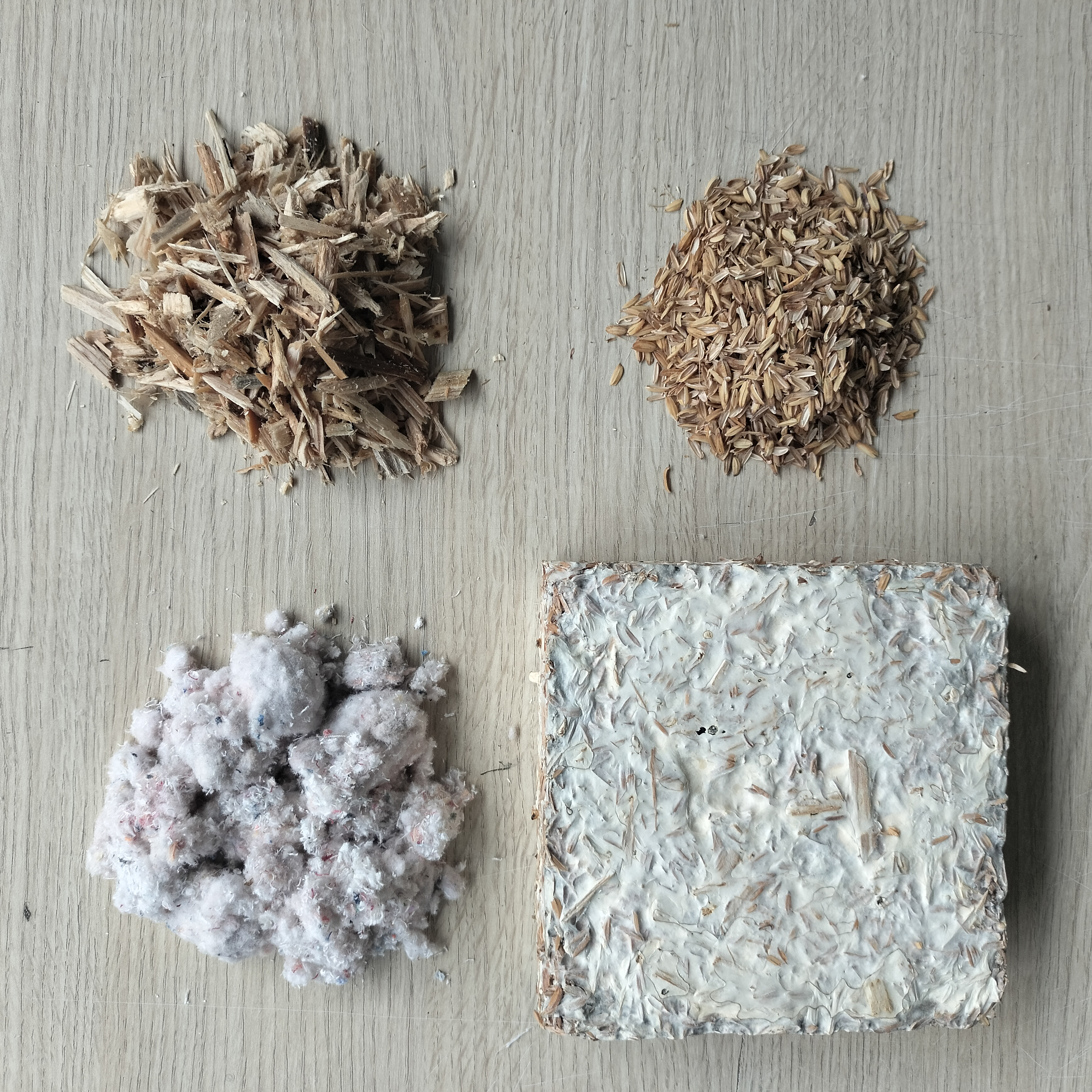
Bio-materials samples: spruce shives (top left), rice husks (top right), shredded textile wastes (bottom left), and an example of mycelium composite

== Embodied carbon and operational carbon of buildings ==
Building impacts belong to two distinct but interrelated types of carbon emissions: operational and embodied carbon. Operational carbon includes emissions related to the building's functioning, such as lighting and heating; embodied carbon encompasses emissions resulting from the physical construction of buildings, including the processing of materials, material waste, transportation, assembly, and disassembly. While research and policy over the past decades have primarily focused on reducing greenhouse gas (GHG) emissions during building operations, by enacting, for instance, the EU Energy Performance of Buildings Directive, the embodied carbon associated with building materials has only recently gained significant attention. This tendency has consequently resulted in a growing interest in the use of low-carbon bio-based materials.

Bio-materials and their co-products offer various benefits: they are renewable, often locally available and during the plant's growth carbon is sequestered, which enhances the production of possible alternative bio-components. This means that when bio-based construction materials are used as buildings' components, their lifespan is usually defined by the building's service life and results in a temporary reduction of the CO_{2} concentration in the atmosphere. During this time, carbon is stored in the building and its emissions are thus slowed down.

Researchers proved that incorporating a larger share of bio-materials can reduce a building's embodied energy by about 20%. Looking at the wider perspective, studies demonstrated that the use of bio-based materials in the built environment would have the potential to reduce over 320,000 tons of carbon dioxide emissions by 2050, which is set as target date by European Union to reach carbon neutrality. Moreover, with buildings becoming more energy-efficient, the embodied impacts from producing and installing new materials contribute significantly to total lifecycle emissions, ranging from 10% to as much as 80% in highly efficient buildings. This scenario highlights the potential for bio-based materials to have a substantial impact on reducing overall building energy emissions.

Embodied and operational carbon of buildings. Operational carbon include all the emissions related to the correct functioning of the building. The embodied carbon, instead, include emissions produced by building materials through their entire life, from their production to their disposal.

== From traditional to innovative building applications ==
Bio-based building materials can be classified depending on their natural origins and on their physical properties, which influence their behaviour when applied to the building system. According to their chemical structure and to their characteristic of being renewable, bio-based materials can be divided into lignocellulosic materials, which come from forestry, vegetation, agriculture; protein-based materials, coming from farming, such as wool and feathers; earth; living materials made of micro-organisms such as mycelium and algae.

Natural materials have been traditionally used in architecture since the vernacular period. Presently, these materials stand out through innovative applications, while novel bio-materials, such as living materials, and bio-wastes, enter the discussion intending to enhance circular business models.

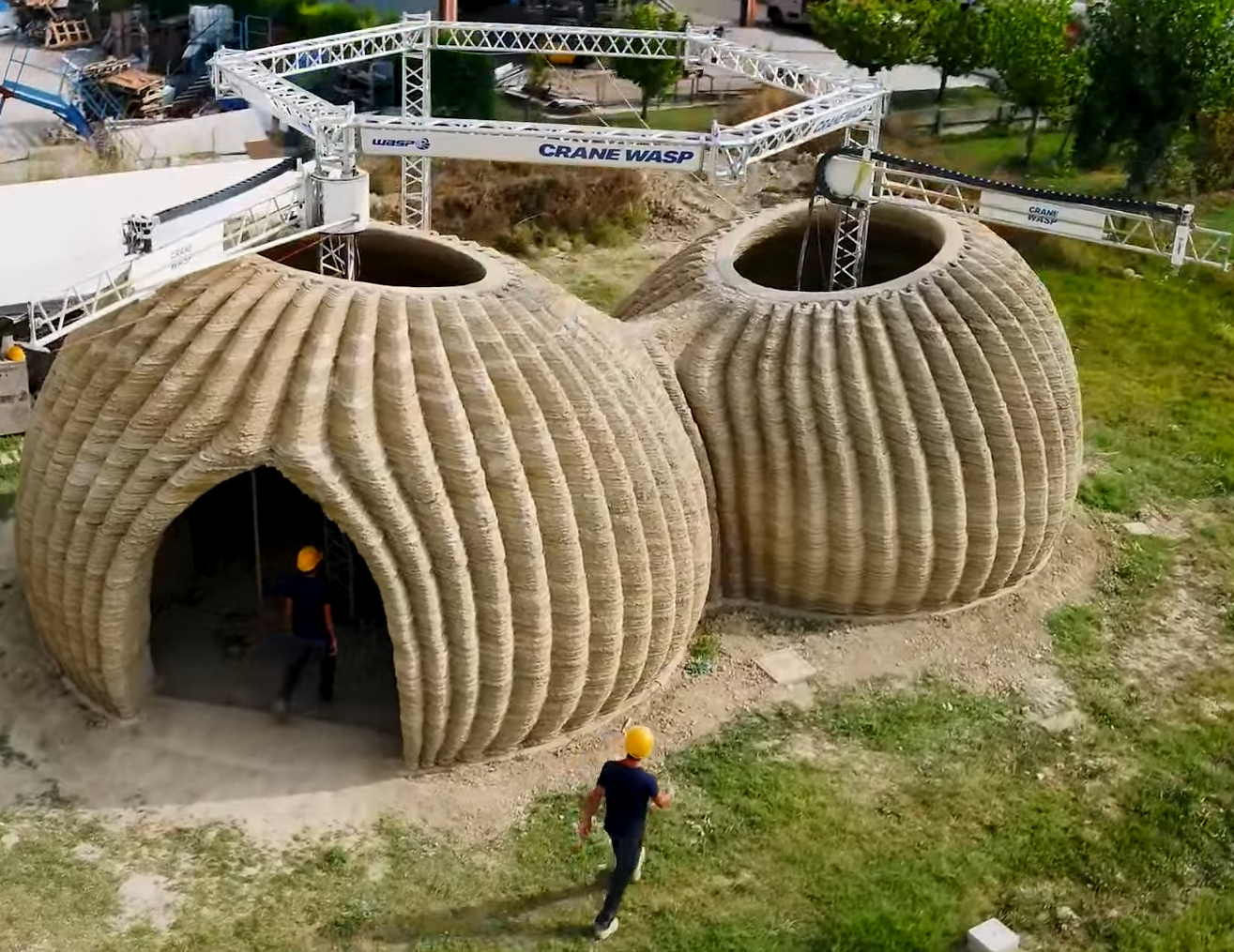
Eco-sustainable 3D printed house "Tecla", designed by Mario Cucinella Architects and Wasp.

=== Timber and earth ===
Among bio-materials, timber, as part of a long, preindustrial history of buildings, has always received the main attention from policy and industry and, in recent years, it has been mainly advocated by researchers and policymakers to replace concrete, iron and steel in the construction sector. Indeed, modular timber construction, such as Plywood, Laminated Veneer Lumber (LVL), Panels, Cross Laminated Timber (CLT), allows for storing a significant amount of carbon in the structure (50% of the mass) and releases significant less GHGs into the atmosphere compared with mineral-based construction. Moreover, wood is considered highly recyclable, as it enables several reuse options.

However, it is important to consider that the climate benefit associated with biogenic carbon storage is only achieved when replaced by the growth of another tree, which normally takes decades. Therefore, even if still representing a renewable resource, within a short time horizon, timber construction cannot be climate neutral. Moreover, in the European context, studies have shown that there is an insufficient quantity of timber to meet the expected demand if there were to be a complete shift towards a timber-based built environment.

Rammed earth has also been largely used in construction due to its strength, durability, non-combustibility, and ability to enhance indoor air quality, starting in the 16th and 17th centuries. With the advent of the Industrial Revolution, however, standardizing earthen materials became difficult, making it challenging to utilize them as effectively as concrete and bricks.

Nowadays, because of low embodied carbon, availability, safety, and thermal characteristics of these building materials, they become a particularly attractive alternatives to more traditional ones. Moreover, there is the potentiality to circumvent disadvantages, such as on-site weather-dependency, by using prefabricated elements and innovative manufacturing processes. In this regard, the Austrian company Erden has developed a technique to prefabricate rammed earth wall elements that can be stacked to construct large-scale buildings. The Belgian BC Materials, instead, transforms excavated earth into building materials, with the production of earth blocks masonry, plasters and paints.

Moreover, the use of additive manufacturing enters the debate as a method with the potentiality to enhance the level of quality in detailing, accuracy, finishing, and reproducibility, while reducing labour needs and increasing in pace. In this regard, a collaboration between Mario Cucinella Architects and Wasp, an Italian company specialised in 3D printing, has resulted in the first 3D-printed, fully circular housing constructions made by earth, called TECLA.

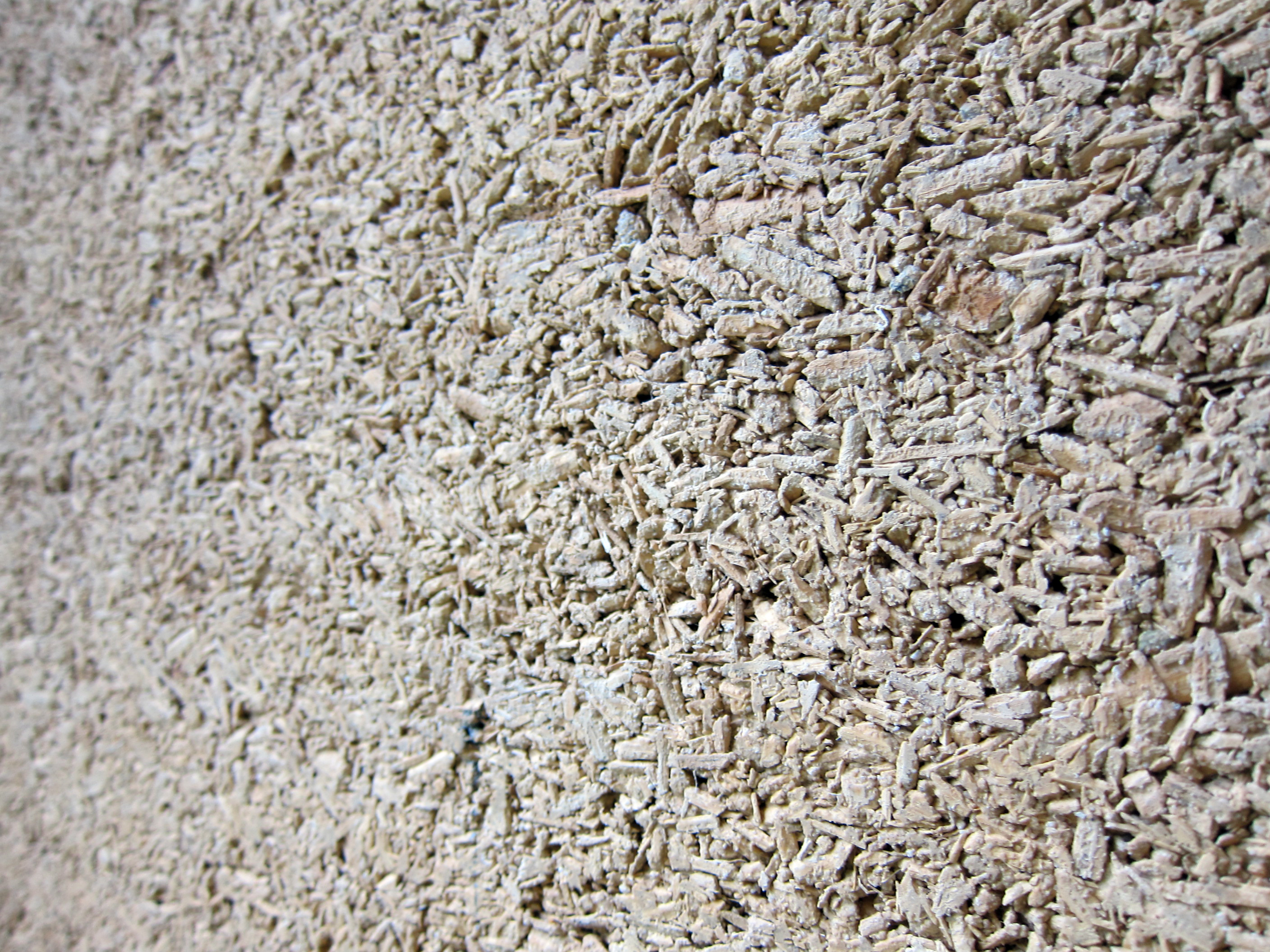
An example of hempcrete wall

=== Fast-growing bio-materials ===
Unlike timber, fast-growing materials are bio-resources that have rapid growth, making them readily available for harvest and use in a very short period. Fast-growing materials are typically derived from agricultural by-products, such as hemp, straw, flax, kenaf, and several species of reed, but can also include trees like bamboo and eucalyptus. Due to their short crops rotation periods, these materials, when used, are directly compensated by the regrowth of the new plants and, overall, this results in a cooling effect on the atmosphere.

Over the past few decades, various construction projects displayed their versatility by using them for many different applications, going from structural components crafted from bamboo to finishing materials like plaster, flooring, siding, roofing shingles, acoustic and thermal panels.

Several studies document their applications in the built environment both as loose materials and as part of a bio-mixture, such as flax concrete, rice husks concrete, straw fibers concrete, or bamboo bio-concrete. Among the others, hempcrete, made of lime and hemp shives, stands out due to its structural and insulating features, while enabling large carbon savings.

In this context, several start-ups and innovative enterprises, such as RiceHouse, Ecological Building System, and Strawcture, have already entered the market with competitive bio-composite alternatives, available either as loose materials or bound by natural or artificial binders.

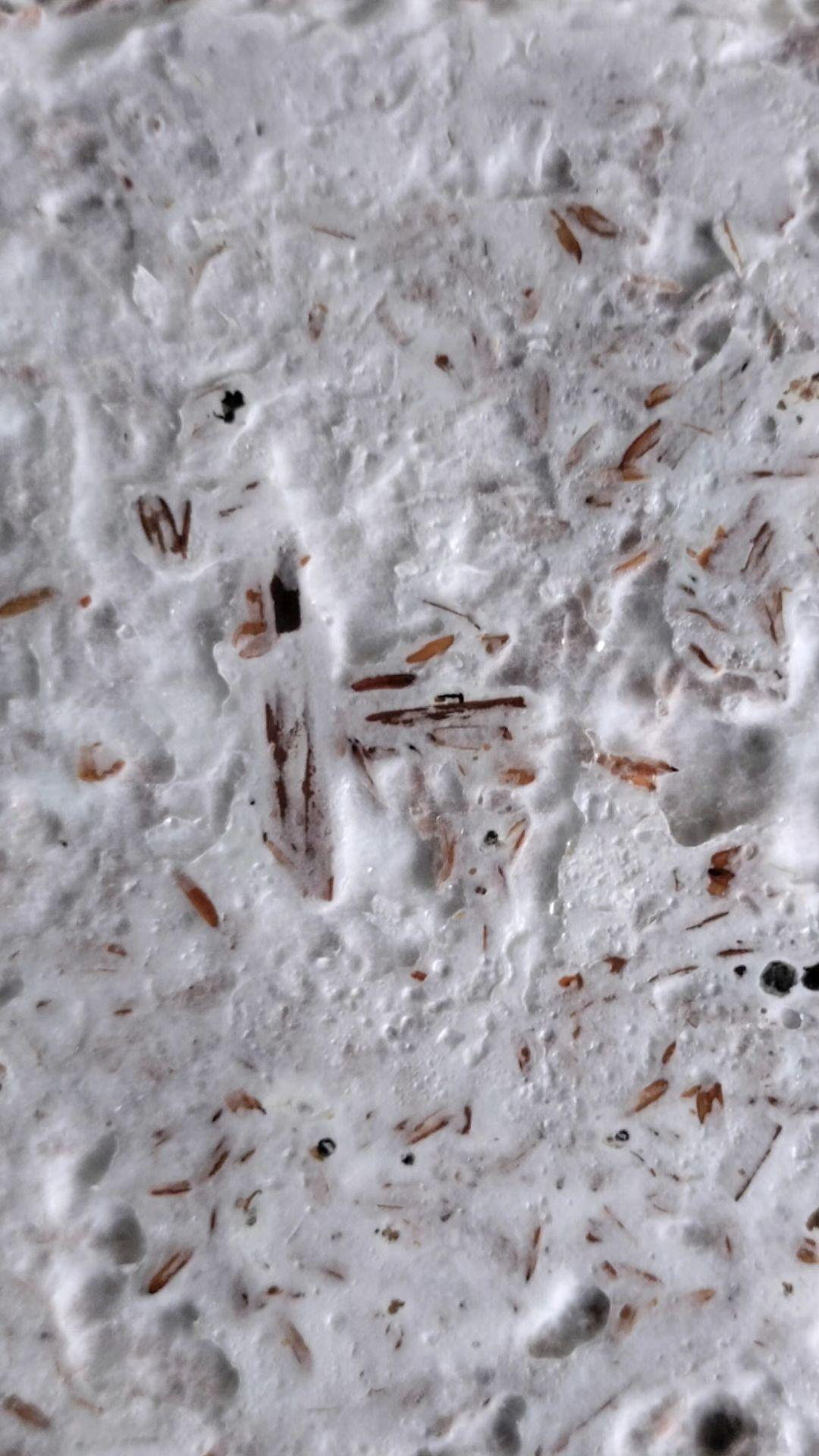
External surface of a mycelium composite made with rice-husks

=== Living building materials: mycelium and algae ===
Algae and mycelium are gaining interest as a research field for building applications.

Algae are mainly discussed for their application on building facades for energy production through the development of bio-reactive façades. The SolarLeaf pilot project, implemented by Arup in Hamburg in 2013, marks the first real-world application of this technology in a residential context, showcasing its potential applicability to both new and existing buildings.

Due to its ability to act as a natural binder instead, mycelium, the vegetative part of fungi, is used as the binding agent of many composite materials. Over the past few years, the research on the topic has been exponential, due to the total biodegradability of the binder and to its ability to valorize waste material, by degrading them and using them as substrates for their growth.

Different temporary projects have displayed the structural capacities of mycelium, both as monolithic and discrete separated elements. Mycelium bricks were tested in 2014 with the construction of the Hi-fi tower, built at the Museum of Modern Art of New York by Arup and Living architecture. Monolithic structures such as El Monolito Micelio or the BioKnit pavilion, were developed instead to grow mycelium either on-site or in a growing chamber in a single piece.

The absence of established methods for producing large-scale mycelium-based composite components, primarily due to the low structural capabilities of such composites and various technological and design limitations, represents today the main obstacle to its industrial scalability for building applications.

However, the Italian MOGU and the American Ecovative are two mycelium companies that were capable of scaling production to industrial levels, manufacturing and selling acoustic panels for indoor spaces. In this context, the project developed by the collaboration between Arup and the universities of Leuven (BE), Kassel (DE) and the Kalrsruher Institut für Technologie, named HOME, aims to advance the upscaling of mycelium-based composites by developing prototypes and using diverse manufacturing processes for indoor acoustic insulation.

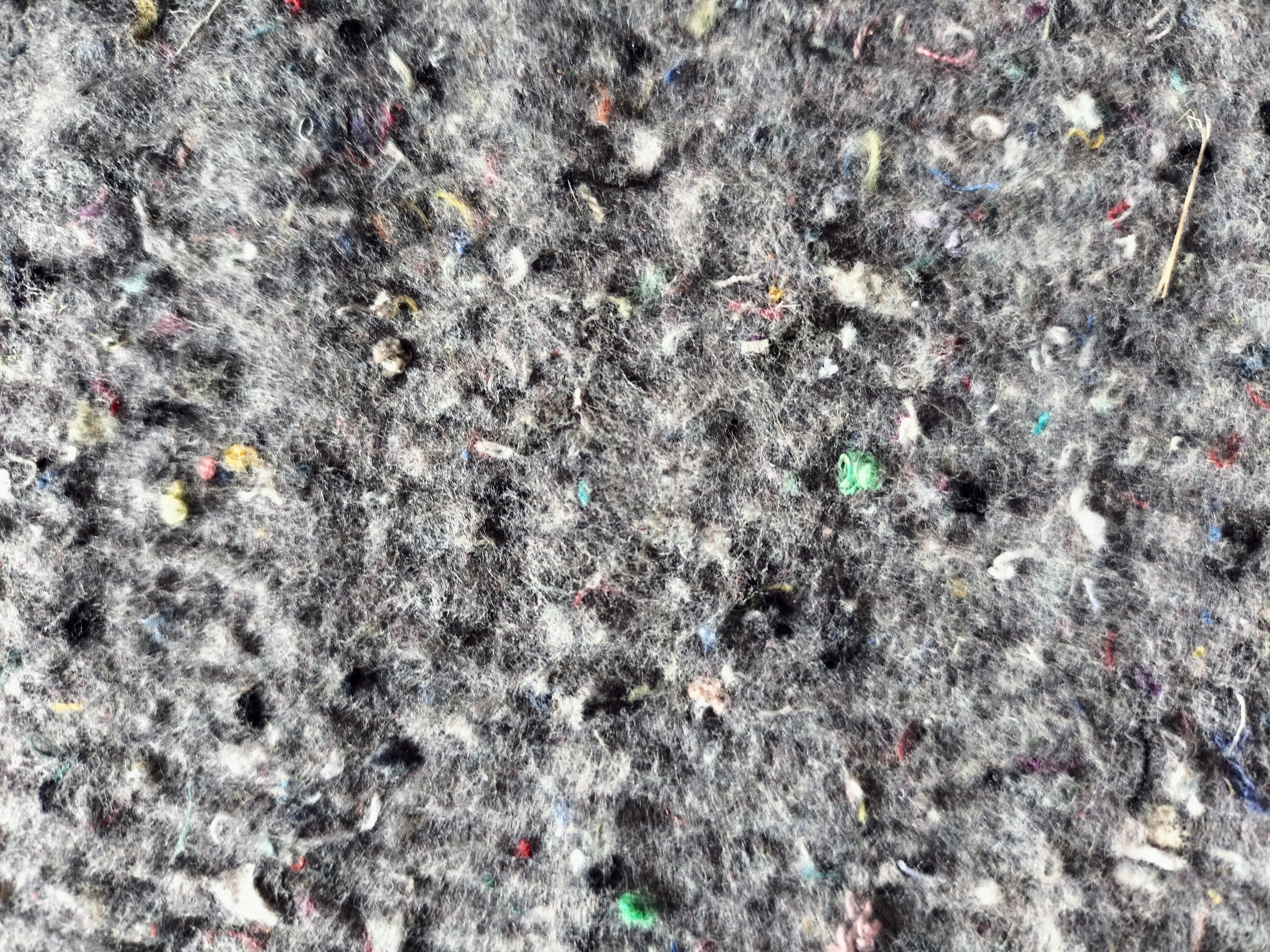
Insulating panel developed during MATE.ria tessile project at Politecnico di Milano.

=== Post-consumer bio-wastes: closing the loop ===
Textile, papers and food wastes are also gaining progressive interest for buildings' applications, as circular strategies enabling up-cycling processes and facilitating an effective transition toward a carbon-neutral society.

Literature documents building components developed from food wastes coming from olive pruning, almond skin wastes, coffee beans and pea pods for the realization of acoustic panels and thermal insulating panels.

In the same way, research has also focused on the reuse of cardboard and waste paper to enable the realisation of bio-composite panels. In this regard, the thermal properties of cellulose fibers sourced from paper and cardboard waste have been tested and found to be particularly effective, achieving a thermal conductivity of 0.042 W·m−1·K−1, which is comparable to traditional materials.

Due to the large waste generation caused by the fashion and clothing, several studies and various research projects, such as the RECYdress project (2022) and MATE.ria tessile (2023), both conducted at Politecnico di Milano, have been developed to investigate textiles treatments and their use as secondary raw materials in the building sector. Indeed, residual flows of textile are estimated to have a recycling potential of about 16 kWh of energy saved for each kilogram of textile.

In this regard, the Waste Framework Directive, which manages in Europe textile wastes obliging member states to ensure the separate collection of textiles for re-use and recycling, might be implemented in 2025 to promote extended producer responsibility schemes. This would require fashion brands and textile producers to pay fees in order to help fund the textile waste collection and treatment costs.

Several products leveraging recycled textiles for insulation are already available on the market. Inno-Therm, a company from Great Britain, produces insulation from recycled industrial cotton material-denim. Similarly, Le Relais, a French recycling company, which collects 45000 tons of used textiles annually, developed a thermal insulation product called Mettise. The product contains at least 85% recycled fibers and consists of cotton (70%), wool / acrylic (15%) and polyester (15%).

== Current criticalities ==
To enable the wide utilization of bio-based materials in the built environment, there are several critical issues that require further investigation.

=== Performance and industrial scalability ===
According to several researchers, one of the main issues of bio-based materials when applied to the construction sector is their required and expected performances, which shall be comparable to the ones of traditional engineered building materials. Extensive research is thus currently on-going to address the challenges allied with long-term durability, reliability, serviceability, properties and sustainable production.

=== A policy framework for bio-building materials ===
In the European context, in the framework of meeting climate mitigation objectives before 2050, European Union is trying to implement, among other measures, the production and utilization of bio-based materials in many diverse sectors and segments of society through regulations such as The European Industrial Strategy, the EU Biotechnology and Biomanufacturing Initiative and the Circular Action Plan.

However, as traditional materials still dominate the construction sector, there is a lack of understanding among some policymakers and developers regarding biomaterials. According to Göswein, the presence of a legal framework would reassure investors and insurance companies and enhance the promotion of circular economy dynamics.

== See also ==
- Bio-based material
- Mycelium-based materials
- Building material
