= Biodesign =

Design with living organisms

Biodesign is an interdisciplinary field uniting design principles with biological sciences, engineering, and emerging biotechnologies. It focuses on the cooperation between living organisms (such as algae, bacteria, and fungi) to create architecture, materials, products, and systems. These components are sustainable, regenerative, and often adaptive to their environment. Biodesign takes inspiration from nature, sometimes using biology as its medium. With the improvement of biopharmas,

In which case, it designs with living organisms, mimics biological processes (biomimicry), or deals with biofabricated materials. Different fields applying biodesign include architecture, fashion design, healthcare, industrial design, and materials science. One focus of biodesign is to drive regenerative and eco-conscious design solutions.

== History ==
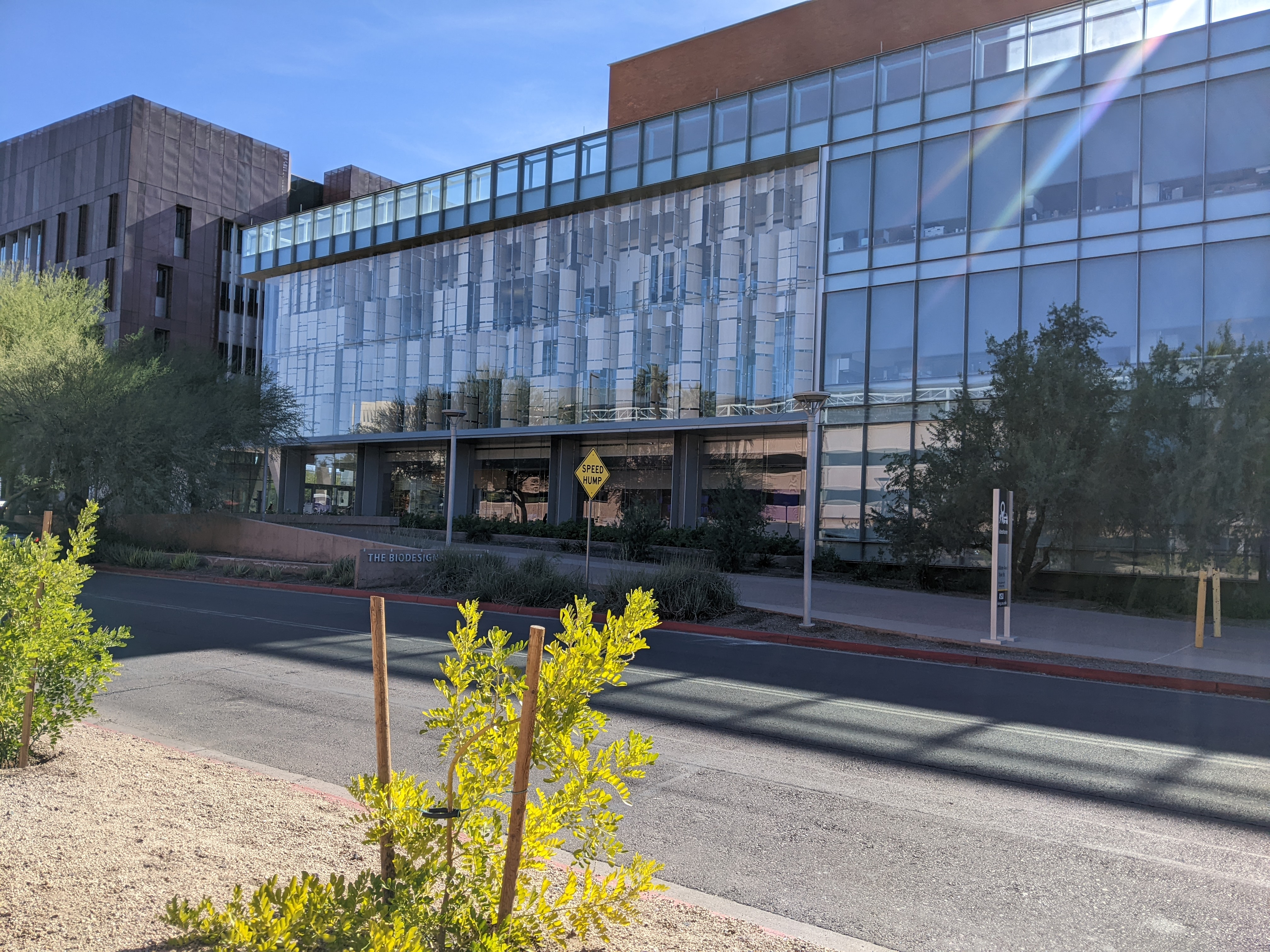
Biodesign Institute

Biodesign originated in the early 20th century with innovations in natural system models. Advances in materials science showed living systems could integrate with the design process. During the 1990s, biotechnology became more popular. Janine Benyus helped spread the concept of biomimicry. The field of synthetic biology, along with tissue engineering and biofabrication, allowed for more design avenues with living organisms. Algae, bacteria, and fungi were among these.

A number of institutions chose biodesign as a formal discipline. Among them were Arizona State University, MIT Media Lab, Central Saint Martins and Biomimicry Institute.

Biodesign expanded to comprise areas of philosophy, ecology and ethics. It has continued to evolve in response to global sustainability challenges. The first biodesign event in New York City was held in 2016.

== Core principles ==
A guiding principle for biodesign is to include biological systems in sustainable and ethical ways. It uses living things and natural processes in creating regenerative and sustainable solutions. Unlike more traditional designs using non-living materials, biodesign incorporates living or biologically derived components (such as algae, engineered bacteria, and mycelium). These materials introduce new dynamics to design processes by growing, responding to stimuli, or self-healing.

- Sustainability: A central tenet of biodesign is environmentally responsible solutions. It seeks to reduce environmental impact and promote regenerative systems. To do so, it leverages biological processes and renewable materials.
- Systems thinking: Biodesign considers how designed interventions interact with broader biological and environmental systems. A holistic view of ecosystems can encourage long-term thinking and responsible innovation.
- Biomimicry: Biodesign takes inspiration from natural forms, processes, and systems when solving challenges.
- Interdisciplinarity: Biodesign integrates fields such as architecture, biology, design, engineering, and material science. Through these collaborations, it is capable of more complex solutions.
- Health: Biodesign seeks to benefit the well-being of both human and non-human life. It prioritizes creating non-toxic and biodegradable materials that are beneficial to ecosystems.

== Applications ==
=== Architecture and urban design ===
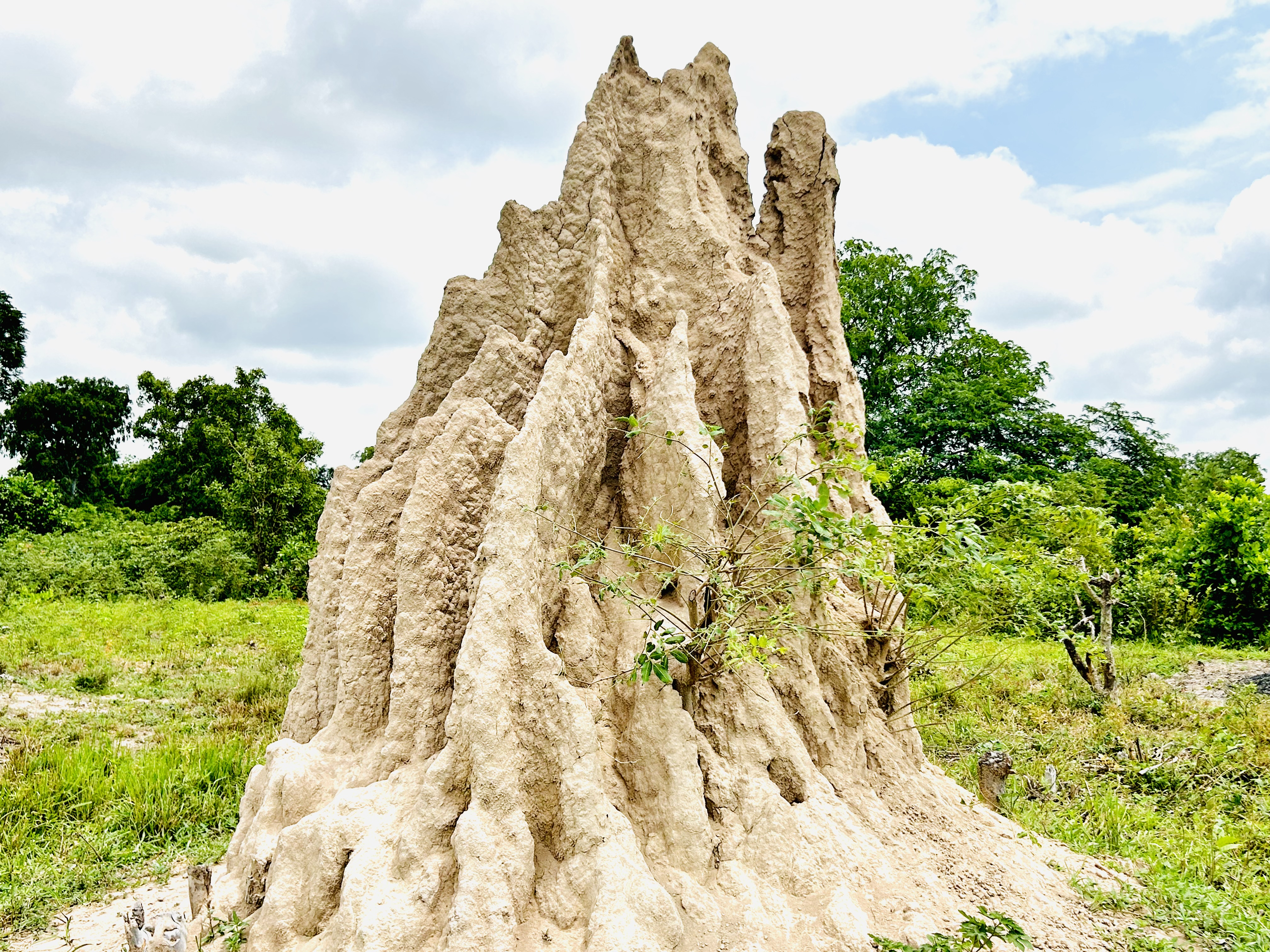
Termite nest

Biodesign introduces ecological processes, living systems, and organic materials to architecture. Some architects use biological materials for construction, façade systems, and insulation. Some benefits of these materials are biodegradability, carbon sequestration, and temperature control. Mycelium bricks used in structures show waste streams and fungal growth can replace materials such as concrete or plastic. As seen in the BIQ House in Hamburg, façades with living materials like microalgae bioreactors can reduce CO_{2}. Through biomimetics from termite mounds and coral growth, biodesign can inform architectural shape. It can also aid in the development of passive cooling and fluid ventilation.

Urban design applies these ideas in moss walls to filter pollutants and biologically responsive surfaces.

=== Products and industrial design ===
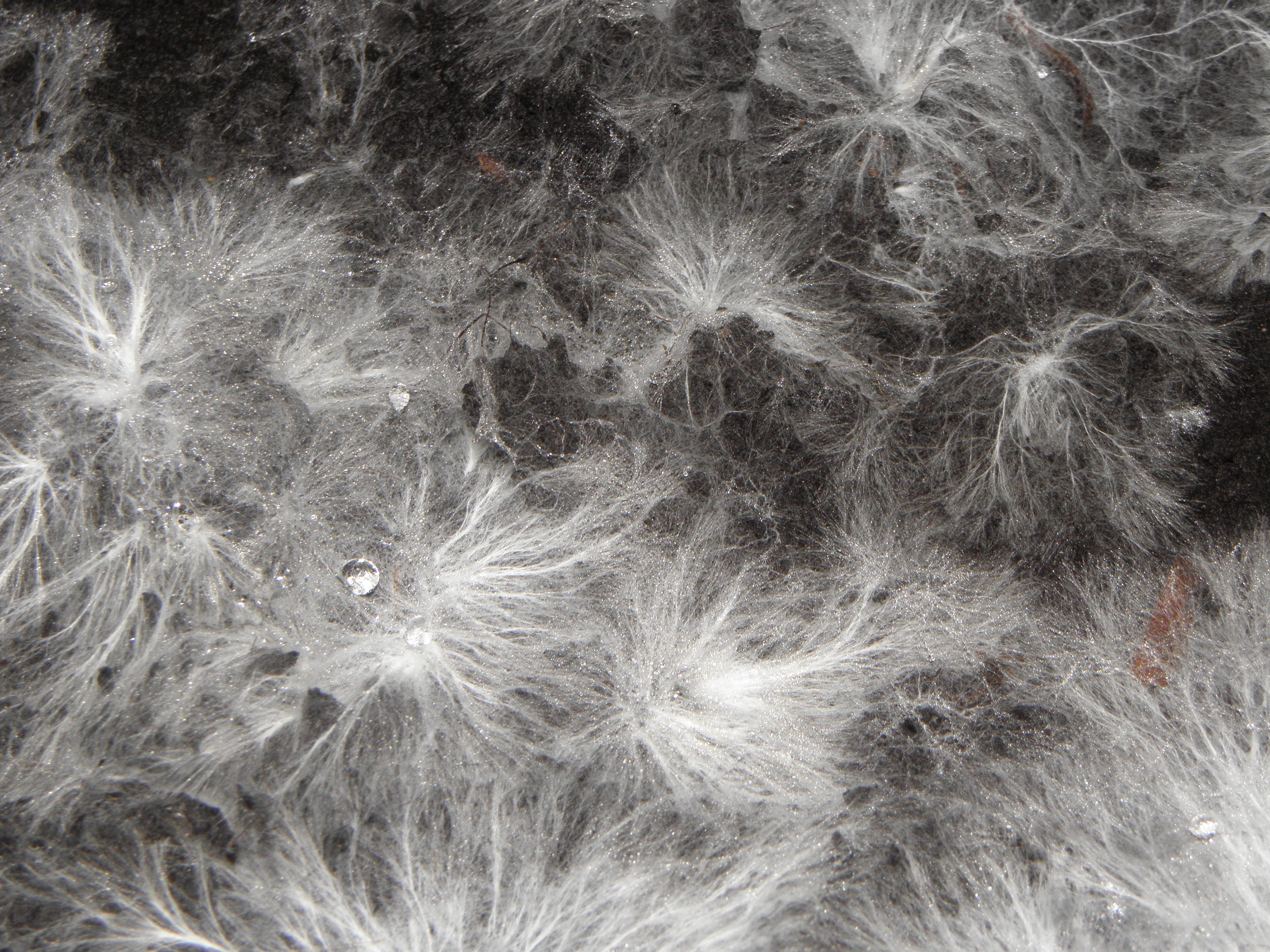
Mycelium

Biodesign encourages a shift to growth and cultivation in product and industrial design. Designers use living organisms to create biodegradable, renewable, and responsive products. An example is the use of mycelium in acoustic panels, furniture, and packaging. Companies like Ecovative produce mycelium-based substitutes for Styrofoam. Other designers have developed mycelium helmets, lamps, and wall tiles. Harvested from fermented bacteria, bacterial cellulose is used to produce leather-like sheets for accessories, bags, and biodegradable film. In contrast to petroleum-based plastics, such materials are grown with lower energy and non-toxic waste.

Some biodesigned products are alive, such as bioluminescent bacteria and algae-powered lamps or air-purifying decor with embedded moss. This introduces new design parameters like growth, decay, and lifecycle. These elements are not present in traditional models of production. Biodesign moves away from it to a more circular, regenerative model.

=== Fashion and textiles ===
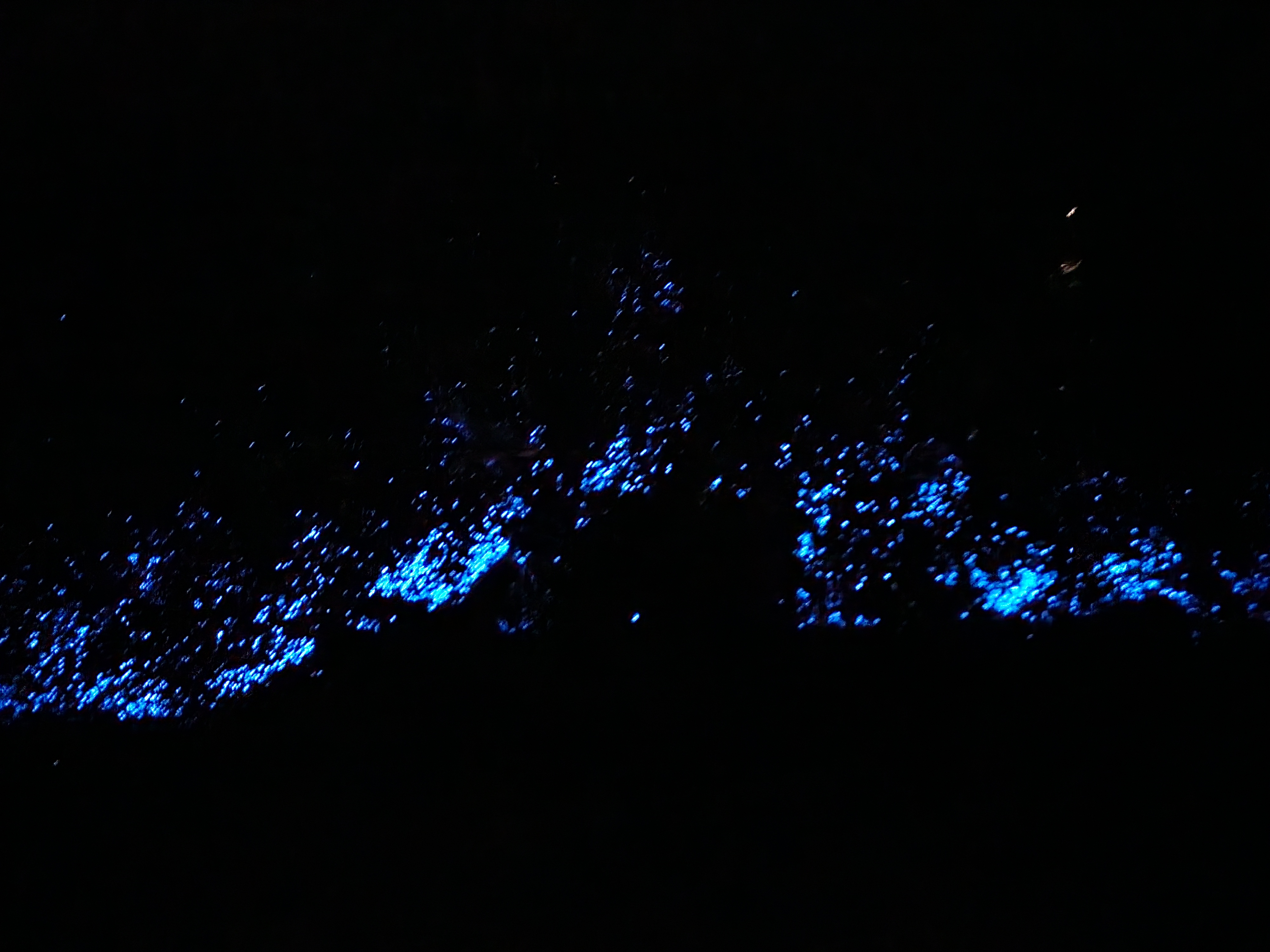
Bioluminescent algae

One of the most resource-consuming and polluting industries is traditional textile production. Some environmentally-focused designers seek alternatives within living materials and biologically inspired processes. Microbial leather, cultured from bacterial cellulose in fermentation tanks, appears promising for this goal. Suzanne Lee, a fashion designer, has shown how microbes can be used to create leather-like fabric without animals and tanning. Bacteria that create natural dyes, algae yarns, and lab-grown spider silk are studied in an effort to substitute petroleum-based textiles and synthetic dyes. These non-traditional materials need less energy, land, and water than traditional textiles. An example of sustainable leather from mycelium is Ephea, produced by Sqim Company.

Biodesign makes responsive and interactive clothing able to react to pH, temperature, or the wearer's movement.

Speculative designs include wearable bioluminescent organisms and clothes housing microalgae or bacteria.

=== Material design ===
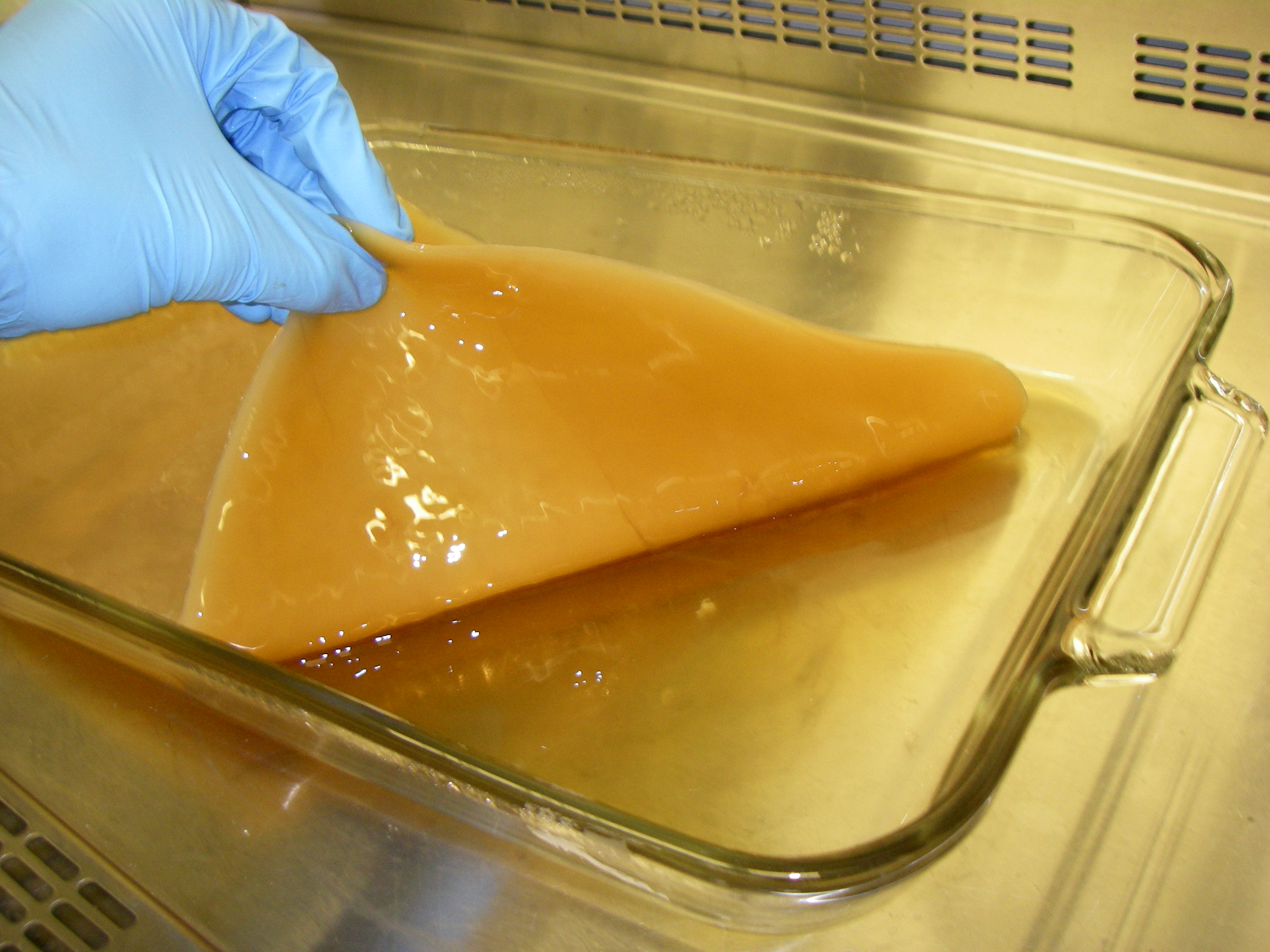
Bacterial cellulose

At the center of biodesign, there is material design. It uses living systems and biological principles to create new forms of regenerative and sustainable materials. Rather than processing raw materials through extractive or chemical means, biodesigners grow materials from microorganisms—even mammalian cells. Mycelium composites are biodegradable, fire-resistant, and light in weight. They can be used in insulation, packaging, and structural components. Such products offer an alternative to foam and plastic. Bio-based and biofabricated materials can be fabricated at room temperature in most cases, and they become active participants of ecological and technological systems, rather than static objects.

Produced by fermentation, bacterial cellulose is another versatile material. It is biocompatible, strong, and transparent. Also being bioengineered are chitosan, gelatin, and silk proteins as hydrogels, coatings, and stimulus-responsive textiles.

Of interest are algae-based materials due to them absorbing carbon dioxide as they grow. Bioplastics and algal-based foams can be used in disposable cutlery, shoe soles, and building panels.

== Ethical and societal considerations ==
Biodesign involves the convergence of living systems, genetic technologies, and living organisms in design. Thusly, it raises ethical questions, such as about accountability, agency, the exploitation of life, and sustainability. The modification and use of living organisms is an area of concern. While biodesign uses non-sentient organisms such as algae, some applications utilize animal or human cells.

It provokes queries about boundaries of artificial and natural life, due to the engineering of organisms for functional purposes. An unintended ecological consequence might result. Concerns arise over whether to use life as a material of design or not, and how to regulate it. Its legislation lags behind other technological progress.

Additional concerns are biosafety and biosecurity, as some genetically engineered organisms are used outside of controlled environments. A risk remains that a bioengineered substance can disrupt ecosystems if not contained and discarded in an appropriate way. As biodesign becomes more accessible to users, specifically with open-source software and community bio-labs, concerns of monitoring and accountability mount.

Biodesign subverts aesthetical norms, since organic or decomposing matter can defy conventional ideas of cleanliness and usability. Such acceptance relies on public culture values and perception, especially on fields like fashion, food, or medicine.

Biodesign can reduce environmental degradation and resource scarcity. Ethical biodesign works to do minimal harm and promote ecosystems and societies. To achieve its pinnacle would require ethicists, policymakers, and the general public for discussion and decision-making.

== See also ==
- Biomimicry
- Eco design
- Mycelium
- Circular economy
- Cradle to cradle
