= Alicia Yoon =

South Korean businesswoman (born 1982)

- Born: 1982 (age 43–44); South Korea
- Education: Columbia University; Harvard Business School
- Occupations: CEO, Peach & Lily

Alicia Yoon (born 1982) is a New York City-based South Korean businesswoman, best known for founding Peach & Lily.

Born on 1982 in South Korea, Alicia Yoon moved to the US at the age of one. After finishing her high school education in Korea, she trained for a year as an esthetician. Afterwards, she moved back to the US to study at Columbia University. After graduating in 2004, she would go into finance and consulting, eventually opting to study at Harvard Business School. After graduating with an MBA, she joined the Boston Consulting Group, but eventually left to found Peach and Lily.
