= New York v. Onofre =

1980 New York Court of Appeals case

People v. Onofre
- Court: New York Court of Appeals
- Full case name: The People of the State of New York, Appellant, v. Ronald Onofre, Respondent. The People of the State of New York, Respondent, v. Conde J. Peoples III, and Philip S. Goss, Appellants. The People of the State of New York, Respondent, v. Mary Sweat, Appellant.
- Decided: December 18, 1980
- Citations: 415 N.E.2d 936; 51 N.Y.2d 476; 434 N.Y.S.2d 947

Case history
- Appealed from: Erie County Court; Appellate Division of the Supreme Court

Court membership
- Judges sitting: Lawrence H. Cooke, Matthew J. Jasen, Domenick L. Gabrielli, Hugh R. Jones, Sol Wachtler, Jacob D. Fuchsberg, Bernard S. Meyer

Case opinions
- Decision by: Jones, Wachtler, Fuschberg, Meyer
- Concurrence: Jasen
- Dissent: Gabrielli, Cooke

Keywords
- Decriminalization of sodomy; LGBT rights; Sex and the law; Sexual orientation discrimination

The People v. Ronald Onofre, 51 N.Y.2d 476, 415 N.E.2d 936, 434 N.Y.S.2d 947 (1980), was an appeal against New York's sodomy laws, decided in the New York Court of Appeals.

The appeal consisted of several cases consolidated into one. The appellants were challenging the constitutionality of a 1965 law, New York Penal Law § 130.38, which made it a misdemeanor to engage in "deviate sexual intercourse" (defined to include anal and oral but not vaginal sex) with another person.

== Appellants ==
Ronald Onofre was convicted for violating New York Penal Law that made it a misdemeanor to engage in sodomy (encompassing anal and oral sex, not vaginal), when he was caught having sex with his 17-year-old male lover in his home. Conde Peoples III and Philip Goss were convicted for engaging in oral sex in an automobile parked in downtown Buffalo. Mary Sweat was convicted for having oral sex with a man in a parked truck, also in Buffalo. All these defendants appealed their convictions and argued that the consensual sodomy statute was unconstitutional.

== Influences from other cases ==
The Court ruled that on the basis of Griswold v. Connecticut, 381 U.S. 479 (1965) and Stanley v. Georgia, the above sexual actions, when consensual, should fall under the right to privacy alluded to in the US Constitution. Specifically, the Court opined:

The People are in no disagreement that a fundamental right of personal decision exists; the divergence of the parties focuses on what subjects fall within its protection, the People contending that it extends to only two aspects of sexual behavior - marital intimacy (by virtue of the Supreme Court's decision in Griswold) and procreative choice (by reason of Eisenstadt and Roe v. Wade). .

The Court also relied on Stanley, a case where the court found violative of the individual's right to be free from governmental interference in making important, protected decisions a statute which made criminal the possession of obscene matter within the privacy of the defendant's home. The Onofre Court stated,

In light of these decisions, protecting under the cloak of the right of privacy individual decisions as to indulgence in acts of sexual intimacy by unmarried persons and as to satisfaction of sexual desires by resort to material condemned as obscene by community standards when done in a cloistered setting, no rational basis appears for excluding from the same protection decisions - such as those made by the defendants before us - to seek sexual gratification from what at least once was commonly regarded as "deviant" conduct, so long as the decisions are voluntarily made by adults in a noncommercial, private setting.

The Court concluded its ruling by stating:

In sum, there has been no showing of any threat, either to participants or the public in general, in consequence of the voluntary engagement by adults in private, discreet, sodomous conduct. Absent is the factor of commercialization with the attendant evils commonly attached to the retailing of sexual pleasures; absent the elements of force or of involvement of minors which might constitute compulsion of unwilling participants or of those too young to make an informed choice, and absent too intrusion on the sensibilities of members of the public, many of whom would be offended by being exposed to the intimacies of others. Personal feelings of distaste for the conduct sought to be proscribed by New York Penal Law § 130.38 and even disapproval by a majority of the populace, if that disapproval were to be assumed, may not substitute for the required demonstration of a valid basis for intrusion by the State in an area of important personal decision protected under the right of privacy drawn from the United States Constitution - areas, the number and definition of which have steadily grown but, as the Supreme court has observed, the outer limits of which it has not yet marked.

== Decision ==
The 5-2 majority opinion was written by Judge Hugh R. Jones, who wrote that "it is not the function of the penal law to provide for the enforcement of moral or theological values." Specifically, those concurring with the decision, believed that "the People have failed to demonstrate how government interference with the practice of personal choice in matters of intimate sexual behavior out of view of the public and with no commercial component will serve to advance the cause of public morality or do anything other than restrict individual conduct and impose a concept of private morality chosen by the State."

Judge Jasen concurred with the result. He rejected the Griswold analysis, but found that the law had no currently rational basis, much like Justice White's concurring opinion in Griswold.

Judge Domenick L. Gabrielli and Chief Judge Cooke dissented. In their opinion, the analysis utilized by the majority meant that "all private, consensual conduct would necessarily involve the exercise of a constitutionally protected "fundamental right" unless the conduct in question jeopardize the physical health of the participant." They concluded their dissent by stating,

The fact remains that western man has never been free to pursue his own choice of sexual gratification without fear of State inference. Consequently, it simply cannot be said that such freedom is an integral part of our concept of ordered liberty as embodied in the due process clauses of the Fifth Amendment and Fourteenth Amendment.

== See also ==
- Kentucky v. Wasson
- Bowers v. Hardwick
- Lawrence v. Texas
- Sex-related court cases
