= 1972 New York state election =

- November 7, 1972

The 1972 state election in New York took place on November 7, 1972, to elect three judges to the Court of Appeals. Republican nominees Domenick L. Gabrielli, Sol Wachtler, and Hugh R. Jones were elected into office. Notably, no women were nominated despite the efforts of New York Governor Nelson A. Rockefeller.

== Background ==
Incumbent judges John F. Scileppi, Francis Bergan, and James Gibson of the New York Court of Appeals would reach the constitutional age limit of 70 years at the end of 1972. The state election was held on November 7, 1972, to elect three judges to the Court of Appeals, as well as all members of the New York State Assembly and the New York State Senate.

Despite efforts by Governor Nelson A. Rockefeller and others, no party nominated a woman to the election for the Court of Appeals. Family Judge Nanette Dembitz was placed fourth in the vote of the Democratic State Committee, and challenged the party's nominees.

== Nominations ==
=== Democratic nominees and primary ===
The Democratic State Committee met on April 3, 1972, and designated Appellate Justices Lawrence H. Cooke and M. Henry Martuscello, and Supreme Court Justice Bernard S. Meyer for the Court of Appeals. On April 14, Family Court Judge Nanette Dembitz announced her challenge to the designees, and a primary was held on June 20.

1972 Democratic primary results
| Office | Party designees | | Challengers | |
|---|---|---|---|---|
| Judge of the Court of Appeals | Bernard S. Meyer | 240,045 | | |
| | Lawrence H. Cooke | 210,233 | | |
| | M. Henry Martuscello | 182,494 | Nanette Dembitz | 244,461 |

=== Republican nominess ===
The Republican State Committee met on April 3, 1972, at Albany, New York, and designated Appellate Justice Dominick L. Gabrielli, Supreme Court Justice Sol Wachler and lawyer Hugh R. Jones, President of the New York State Bar Association, for the Court of Appeals.

=== Other parties ===
The Liberal State Committee met on April 3, 1972, and designated Democrats M. Henry Martuscello and Bernard S. Meyer; and Republican Sol Wachtler for the Court of Appeals. Martuscello lost the Democratic nomination in the primary, and ran on the Liberal ticket only.

The Conservative State Committee met on April 4, and designated Republicans Dominick L. Gabrielli and Hugh R. Jones, and Democrat Lawrence H. Cooke for the Court of Appeals.

The designees of the Republican, Liberal and Conservative parties were not challenged in primaries.

== Result ==
The whole Republican ticket was elected.

1972 state election results
| Office | Republican ticket | | Democratic ticket | | Conservative ticket | | Liberal ticket | |
|---|---|---|---|---|---|---|---|---|
| Judge of the Court of Appeals | Domenick L. Gabrielli | 2,886,036 | Bernard S. Meyer | 2,743,394 | Domenick L. Gabrielli | 427,486 | Bernard S. Meyer | 233,376 |
| Judge of the Court of Appeals | Sol Wachtler | 2,893,433 | Lawrence H. Cooke | 2,596,529 | Lawrence H. Cooke | 438,091 | Sol Wachtler | 303,330 |
| Judge of the Court of Appeals | Hugh R. Jones | 2,760,439 | Nanette Dembitz | 2,787,443 | Hugh R. Jones | 409,697 | M. Henry Martuscello | 237,815 |

== See also ==
- New York state elections
- 1972 United States presidential election

== Sources ==
- Official result: NIXON WON STATE BY 1,241,694 VOTES; Albany Tally Shows 79.5% of Those Registered Voted in NYT on December 12, 1972 (subscription required)

New York Red Book 1973
