= Boomer v. Atlantic Cement Co. =

- Court: New York Court of Appeals
- Full case name: Oscar H. Boomer et al. v. Atlantic Cement Company, Inc.
- Argued: October 31 1969
- Decided: March 4 1970
- Citation: 26 N.Y.2d 219, 309 N.Y.S.2d 312 (N.Y. 1970)

Case history
- Prior history: Boomer v. Atlantic Cement Co., 30 A D 2d 480, reversed.

Court membership
- Chief judge: Stanley H. Fuld
- Associate judges: Francis Bergan, Adrian P. Burke, Matthew J. Jasen and John F. Scileppi

Case opinions
- Majority: Bergan, joined by Fuld, Burke and Scileppi
- Dissent: Jasen

Boomer v. Atlantic Cement Co., was a New York court case in which New York's highest court considered whether permanent damages were an appropriate remedy in lieu of a permanent injunction. The case was one of the first and most influential instances of a court applying permanent damages. It is widely referenced in law and economics research and case law.

== Background ==
Oscar H. Boomer and other landowners with property adjacent to a cement plant had sued, alleging that dirt, smoke and vibration issuing from it constituted nuisance. The trial court agreed and awarded damages, but rejected the request for an injunction to cut off the problem.

On appeal, the court observed that ordinarily, "where a nuisance has been found and where there has been any substantial damage shown by the party complaining, an injunction will be granted." Following that path would result in closing the plant, however, and the court sought to avoid that "drastic remedy." Instead, it engaged in a cost-balancing analysis, contrasting the trial court's finding that the total permanent damages done to all plaintiffs was $185,000 with Atlantic Cement's investment in the plant (upwards of $45,000,000) and more than 350 jobs at stake. "The parties could settle this private litigation at any time if defendant paid enough money and the imminent threat of closing the plant would build up the pressure on defendant," the court observed:

[G]rant[ing] the injunction unless defendant pays plaintiffs such permanent damages as may be fixed by the court seems to do justice between the contending parties. All of the attributions of economic loss to the properties on which plaintiffs' complaints are based will have been redressed ... [and it] seems reasonable to think that the risk of being required to pay permanent damages to injured property owners by cement plant owners would itself be a reasonably effective spur to research for improved techniques to minimize nuisance.

The judges also discussed the concept of “servitude on land.” Servitude, in property law, ties rights and obligations to ownership of land so that they run with the land to successive owners. The majority described the damage imposed by the cement plant as a servitude on the land. They claimed that payment of permanent damages would constitute full compensation for the servitude placed on the land. The dissenting opinion posited that imposing a servitude on land where the impairment continues for a private use is unconstitutional. The author cited the state constitution—“private property shall not be taken for public use”—remarking that it does not mention private use and concluding that “the permanent impairment of private property for private purposes is not authorized in the absence of clearly demonstrated public benefit.” However, the majority's interpretation of the damage placed on the land by the nuisance held.

The trial court was ordered "to grant an injunction which shall be vacated upon payment by defendant of ... permanent damage[s] to the respective plaintiffs."

== Significance ==
The case is often cited as an illustration of the law and economics approach in nuisance law and property law. The court granted an injunction against the cement plant for nuisance, but permitted the plant to pay permanent damages after which the court would vacate the injunction. In essence, the court permitted the plant to pay the net present value of its effects and to continue polluting.
