= Devlin v. Smith =

- Court: New York Court of Appeals
- Full case name: Mary Devlin, as Administratrix, etc., Appellant, v. Josiah T. Smith et al., Respondents.
- Decided: October 10, 1882
- Citation: 89 N.Y. 470 (1882)

Keywords
- Product liability

Devlin v. Smith, 89 N.Y. 470 (1882) was a seminal case decided by the New York Court of Appeals in the area of product liability law.

The Court held that a duty to third parties "exists when a defect is such as to render the article in itself imminently dangerous, and serious injury to any person using it is a natural and probable consequence of its use." The Court further held that scaffolding to be used in the painting of a courthouse was an inherently dangerous article.

== Background ==
Smith, a painter, employed Stevenson, a contractor, to build a 90-foot-tall scaffold for the express purpose of enabling the painter's workmen to stand upon it. A workman employed by Smith was killed by a fall, caused by the negligence of Stevenson in the construction of the scaffold upon which he was working. As Cardozo noted in McPherson, the contractor knew that workmen would use the scaffold and that, if improperly constructed, the scaffold was a dangerous trap.

The administratrix sued both Smith and Stevenson for negligence. The trial court dismissed her complaint. The Supreme Court in the Second Judicial Department (New York) affirmed. The administratrix appealed.

== Opinion of the court ==
On appeal, the court affirmed as to the employer and reversed as to the scaffold-builder. The court found that there was sufficient evidence to require the submission to the jury of the question of whether the failure of the scaffold was attributable to negligence in its construction. The question of contributory negligence on the part of the deceased was also one for the jury. There was no evidence of negligence on the part of the employer in selecting the scaffold-builder, nor was there any evidence that the employer knew or had reason to know of any defect in the scaffold. The scaffold-builder was not the agent or servant of the employer but an independent contractor for whose acts or omissions the employer was not liable.

Smith's employee was injured when the scaffold collapsed; however, the court held that Smith was not liable under a restricted rule of employer's liability. But as the party responsible for the negligent construction of the scaffold, Stevenson was held liable to the injured workman because he constructed a scaffold that would be imminently dangerous to the user if negligently constructed. Thus, the common-law rule was extended to provide liability for the negligent manufacture of a product that becomes dangerous because it was defectively produced. The court limited liability with a narrow rule of foreseeability. Accordingly, liability to third parties could arise if a defect rendered a product imminently dangerous and serious personal injury was a natural and probable consequence of its use. Id. at 477.

The court noted that ordinarily liability of a manufacturer for defects of a product would be limited by privity. Here the court held, however, that the defendant was liable. The court reasoned:

[N]otwithstanding this rule, liability to third parties has been held to exist when the defect is such as to render the article in itself imminently dangerous, and serious injury to any person using it is a natural and probable consequence of its use. As where a dealer in drugs carelessly labeled a deadly poison as a harmless medicine, it was held that he was liable not merely to the person to whom he sold it, but to the person who ultimately used it, though it passed through many hands. This liability was held to rest, not upon any contract or direct privity between him and the party injured, but upon the duty which the law imposes on every one to avoid acts in their nature dangerous to the lives of others.

Id.

== Aftermath ==
=== Heaven v. Pender ===
Contrast Heaven v. Pender, 11 Q.B.D. 503., an English case of the next year, in which the court also permitted recovery to a worker injured as the result of defective scaffolding used in the painting of a ship but based its decision not on the inherently dangerous product rule but on the grounds that the dock owner had invited the worker onto the property.

=== McPherson v. Buick Motor Co. ===
Judge Cardozo cited this case in MacPherson v. Buick Motor Co. There, the defendant argued that imminently dangerous products included only poisons, explosives, and firearms; therefore, Buick Motor Company was not liable for its automobile. Disagreeing, Cardozo's majority opinion first traced the judicial development of the imminent danger rule articulated in Thomas v. Winchester, in which the court held poison to be imminently dangerous. In Thomas, the New York Court of Appeals held that if a defendant's product placed human life in imminent danger, the defendant would be liable regardless of whether the defendant directly sold the product to the plaintiff. Next, Cardozo's opinion examined the case of Devlin v. Smith, where the court held a scaffold builder liable to a painter's employee when faulty scaffolding injured the employee. Finally, Cardozo discussed Statler v. George A. Ray Manufacturing Co., in which the court expanded its concept of "imminently dangerous" to include a coffee urn that exploded after the defendant had installed it in a restaurant.

Relying on these precedents, Cardozo wrote in MacPherson: "It may be that Devlin v. Smith and Statler v. Ray Mfg. Co. have extended the rule of Thomas v. Winchester. If so, this court is committed to the extension." Thus, Cardozo concluded, it would be consistent with the "Trend of judicial thought" to classify an automobile as imminently dangerous.
