= 1967 New York state election =

- November 7, 1967

The 1967 New York state election was held on November 7, 1967, to elect two judges to the New York Court of Appeals. In addition, a revised State Constitution was proposed, and rejected; and the voters approved a $2,500,000,000 transportation bond issue.

== Background ==
Stanley H. Fuld had been elected Chief Judge in 1966. On December 23, 1966, Governor Nelson A. Rockefeller appointed Appellate Justice Charles D. Breitel, a Republican, to the seat vacated by Fuld, effective January 1, 1967, to fill the vacancy temporarily.

Judge John Van Voorhis would reach the constitutional age limit of 70 years at the end of the year.

The State Constitutional Convention met between April and September 1967, and decided to submit the revised Constitution in one piece to the voters for ratification.

== Nominations ==
The Republican and Democratic state committees met on September 6 at Albany, New York, and cross-endorsed the incumbent Republican Judge Charles D. Breitel and the Democratic Supreme Court Justice Matthew J. Jasen, of Buffalo.

Breitel refused to accept the Conservative endorsement, so they nominated Kenneth J. Mullane.

== Result ==
The jointly nominated candidates were elected.

The incumbent Breitel was re-elected.

1967 state election result
| Office | Republican ticket | | Democratic ticket | | Conservative ticket | | Liberal ticket | |
|---|---|---|---|---|---|---|---|---|
| Judge of the Court of Appeals | Charles D. Breitel | 2,188,084 | Charles D. Breitel | 2,099,274 | Kenneth J. Mullane | 432,641 | Charles D. Breitel | 206,649 |
| Judge of the Court of Appeals | Matthew J. Jasen | 2,133,489 | Matthew J. Jasen | 2,041,076 | Matthew J. Jasen | 370,607 | Matthew J. Jasen | 197,037 |

== See also ==
- New York state elections

== Sources ==
- Official result: New Charter Lost by 2-Million Votes, New York Times, December 12, 1967, page 37. Accessed February 2, 2019.
