= Thomas v. Winchester =

1852 New York Court of Appeals case

- Court: New York Court of Appeals
- Full case name: Thomas v. Winchester
- Decided: July 1852
- Citation: 6 N.Y. 397

Court membership
- Judges sitting: Charles Herman Ruggles, Addison Gardiner

Case opinions
- Decision by: Charles Herman Ruggles

Keywords
- Product liability

Thomas v. Winchester, 6 N.Y. 397 (1852), which established the "imminent danger to human life" doctrine, was at the head of the cases in assaulting the protective wall of privity in the tort field. Subsequent examples include: MacPherson v. Buick Motor Co., Goldberg v. Kollsman Instrument Corp., and finally, Judge Jones's landmark holding in Codling v. Paglia, in which the Court demolished what was left of the privity barrier in tort cases by adopting the doctrine of strict products liability.

In Thomas v. Winchester, the Court, departing from the old common law rule in Winterbottom v. Wright, held that a commercial packager of a poison falsely labeled as harmless medicine, who sold it to a druggist who, in turn, sold it to the plaintiff who then ingested it should be liable for her acute distress. The Court found a way around the lack of privity between the consumer and the packager by adopting the rule that a party who puts falsely labeled poison into the market and thus "puts human life in imminent danger" should respond in damages to the ultimate consumer.

== See also ==
- Privity of contract
- Loop v. Litchfield
- Losee v. Clute
