= Domenick L. Gabrielli =

American judge (1912–1994)

Domenick Luciano Gabrielli (December 13, 1912, in Rochester, Monroe County, New York – March 25, 1994, in Albany, New York) was an American lawyer, politician and judge.

== Life ==
He was the son of Italian immigrants Rocco Gabrielli and Veronica (Battisti) Gabrielli. He graduated from St. Lawrence University, and in 1936 from Albany Law School. He was admitted to the bar in 1937. In 1938, he married Dorothy Hedges, and they had two children.

In 1939, he became Corporation Counsel of Bath, New York. In 1942, he was commissioned an ensign in the United States Navy. During World War II, he served in North Africa, Italy and Malta, and took part in the landing at Salerno, Italy, known as Operation Avalanche, in September 1943. After the war, he resumed his office as Corporation Counsel of Bath and counsel to other cities and villages of the area.

In 1953, he was first appointed and then elected District Attorney of Steuben County. From 1957 to 1961, he was a Judge of the Steuben County Court and the Children's Court.

In 1961, he was appointed to the New York Supreme Court (7th District) to fill a vacancy, and elected in November 1961 to a fourteen-year term. He sat on the Appellate Division from 1968 on.

In 1972, he was elected on the Republican and Conservative tickets to the New York Court of Appeals. In 1978, his was one of the seven names on the list submitted to Governor Hugh L. Carey from which to choose the new Chief Judge, but Lawrence H. Cooke was selected. He retired from the Court of Appeals at the end of 1982 when he reached the constitutional age limit of 70 years. Afterwards he resumed the practice of law at Rochester.

In 1983, he was appointed by Governor Mario Cuomo as Chairman of the Judicial Screening Committee which recommends candidates for judicial appointments.

He died at the Villa Mary Immaculate Nursing Home in Albany after struggling a month with pneumonia.

== Sources ==
- The History of the New York Court of Appeals, 1932-2003 by Bernard S. Meyer, Burton C. Agata & Seth H. Agata (pages 28) [gives first name "Dominick"]
- Court of Appeals judges
- Domenick Gabrielli, 81, Ex-Judge On New York's Top Court, Is Dead in NYT on March 28, 1994
