= 1973 New York state election =

- November 6, 1973

The 1973 New York state election was held on November 6, 1973, to elect the Chief Judge of the New York Court of Appeals. Additionally, a $3,500,000,000 transit-bond issue was proposed by Governor Nelson A. Rockefeller, and rejected by the voters with 1,593,531 votes for it and 2,210,907 votes against it.

== Background ==
Chief Judge Stanley H. Fuld would reach the constitutional age limit of 70 years at the end of the year.

For the first time since the election of Frank H. Hiscock over Almet F. Jenks in 1916, the election for Chief judge was contested. For almost 60 years, all Chief Judges had been cross-endorsed by the two major parties.

== Nominations ==
=== Democratic primary ===
The Democratic State Committee met on March 12. No candidate received a majority, and the three contenders who polled more than 25% of the vote, U.S. District Court for the Eastern District of New York Judge Jack B. Weinstein, Appellate Justice Francis T. Murphy and Supreme Court Justice Irwin R. Brownstein, were designated to run in a primary election for Chief Judge. Trial lawyer Lawrence D. Fuchsberg filed a petition to challenge the designees. The primary was held on June 5. The result was so narrow that the winner was known only after the release of the official result on June 21, Fuchsberg winning by a plurality of 755 votes.

1973 Democratic primary results
Office	Party designees						Challenger	
Chief Judge	Jack B. Weinstein	242,039	Francis T. Murphy Jr.	213,673	Irwin R. Brownstein	81,618	Jacob D. Fuchsberg	242,794

=== Other parties ===
The Republicans met on March 7, and nominated Charles D. Breitel.

The Liberals met on March 10, and endorsed the Republican nominee Charles D. Breitel.

The Conservatives nominated Supreme Court Justice James J. Leff, a registered Democrat, for Chief Judge.

== Result ==
The Republican/Liberal candidate was elected.

1973 state election result
Office	Republican ticket		Democratic ticket		Liberal ticket		Conservative ticket	
Chief Judge	Charles D. Breitel	1,957,314	Jacob D. Fuchsberg	1,850,552	Charles D. Breitel	248,075	James J. Leff	219,314

== See also ==
- New York state elections
- 1973 New York City mayoral election

== Sources ==
- Official result: Metropolitan Briefs; New York Certifies Transit-Bond Vote in NYT on December 13, 1973 (subscription required)
