= Chysky v. Drake Bros. Co. =

- Court: New York Court of Appeals
- Full case name: Bertha Chysky, Respondent, v. Drake Brothers Company, Inc., Appellant
- Decided: April 17, 1923
- Citation: 235 N.Y. 468, 139 N.E. 576 (1922)

Keywords
- Product liability

Chysky v. Drake Bros. Co., 235 N.Y. 468, 139 N.E. 576 (1922), was a products liability case before the New York Court of Appeals. The Court held that a plaintiff cannot recover from a defendant based on implied warranty when she does not have contractual privity with him; thus, a plaintiff cannot recover from a defendant who sold her employer food unfit for consumption, because the defendant's implied warranty extended only to the employer.

Chysky is part of a progression of cases that influenced the products liability synthesis that emerged early in the century. The Chysky case reflects a refinement of Judge Cardozo's argument in MacPherson v Buick Motor Co. that a person could be liable for a defective product to someone other than the immediate purchaser. In Chysky, Cardozo joined Judge McLaughlin's opinion, which relied on Cardozo's statement in MacPherson that the basis of liability in that case was in tort, not contract. "If the exceptions expressed in MacPherson had been a smokescreen for the basic principle that a producer of a defective product would be liable to anyone who might be expected to use it, Cardozo would have applied the MacPherson principles to permit the waitress to recover regardless of her choice not to sue in tort. Yet Cardozo joined the majority that ruled against the waitress, not Judge Hogan's silent dissent."

== Brief of case ==
=== Facts ===
Plaintiff's employer gave her a piece of cake that had been made and sold to him by the defendant. There was a nail in a cake that struck her gum, causing it to be infected to the extent that three teeth needed to be removed.

Plaintiff sued the person who sold the cake to her employer, upon the theory that he was liable to her since he had implicitly warranted (when he sold the cake to her employer) that it was fit for human consumption.

=== Issue ===
Does the provision of the Uniform Sales Act §15(1) that provides,

“there is no implied warranty or condition as to the quality or fitness for any particular purpose of goods supplied under a contract to sell or a sale, except as follows: 1. Where the BUYER expressly or by implication makes known to the seller the particular purpose for which the goods are required, and it appears that the BUYER relies on the seller’s skill or judgment (whether he be the grower or manufacturer or not), there is an implied warranty that the goods shall be reasonably fit for such purpose”

include a third party who does not have privity of contract with the seller if no negligence is implied?

=== Holding ===
No, said the Court of Appeals. The provision does not include a third party who does not have privity of contract with the seller if no negligence is implied. If there is no privity of contract between third persons and the seller of food, there can be no implied warranty. The benefit of warranty (either express or implied) does not run with the chattel on its resale (and thus is unlike a covenant running with land, which does give a subsequent purchaser a right of action on a warranty).

=== Reasoning ===
The Court of appeals reasoned:

- In Rinaldi v. Mohican Co., the cause of action arose after the section of the Personal Property Law quoted took effect. Court held that “the mere purchase by a customer from a retail dealer in foods of an article ordinarily used for human consumption does by implication make known to the vendor the purpose for which the article is used.”
- In the case at hand, the plaintiff received the cake from her employer, who bought the cake from the defendant. Defendant is not liable to the plaintiff for her injuries because there was no contract between her and the defendant. The general rule is that a manufacturer or seller of food or other articles of personal property is not liable to third persons under an implied warranty. If there is no privity of contract, there is no implied warranty.

== Notes ==
The plaintiff could have sued in tort rather than in contract (implied warranty), but plaintiff limited her right to recover to a breach of warranty. This indicates the continued relevance of privity in employment cases.
