= 1963 New York state election =

- November 5, 1963

The 1963 New York state election was held on November 5, 1963, to elect a judge of the New York Court of Appeals. Besides, an amendment to the State Constitution proposed to allow off-track betting and was accepted.

== Background ==
Judge Sydney F. Foster would reach the constitutional age limit of 70 years at the end of the year.

== Nominations ==
Both Democratic and the Republican state committees met on September 9, and nominated Democrat Francis Bergan, the Presiding Justice of the Appellate Division (Third Dept.), to succeed Foster.

The Liberal State Committee met on September 10, and endorsed the Democratic/Republican nominee.

== Result ==
Francis Bergan was elected unopposed.

1963 state election result
Office	Democratic ticket		Republican ticket		Liberal ticket	
Judge of the Court of Appeals	Francis Bergan	2,155,844	Francis Bergan	2,141,261	Francis Bergan	191,077

== See also ==
- New York state elections

== Sources ==
- VOTE LIGHT HERE; ...Amendments Pass; Off-Track Betting Proposal Is Approved by a Margin of 3 to 1 in Light City Voting in NYT on November 6, 1963 (subscription required)
