= Babcock v. Jackson =

Landmark U.S. case on conflict of laws

- Court: New York Court of Appeals
- Full case name: Georgia W. Babcock v. Mabel B. Jackson, as Executrix of William H. Jackson, Deceased
- Argued: January 23 1963
- Decided: May 9 1963
- Citation: 191 N.E.2d 279; 12 N.Y.2d 473

Case history
- Prior history: Complaint dismissed, Sup. Ct. Special Term; aff'd, App. Div.

Holding
- The law of the jurisdiction governs that has the strongest interest in the resolution of the particular issue presented. Appellate Division reversed.

Court membership
- Chief judge: Charles S. Desmond
- Associate judges: Marvin R. Dye, Stanley H. Fuld, John Van Voorhis, Adrian P. Burke, Sydney F. Foster, John F. Scileppi

Case opinions
- Majority: Fuld, joined by Desmond, Dye, Burke, Foster
- Dissent: Van Voorhis, joined by Scileppi

Babcock v. Jackson, 191 N.E.2d 279, 12 N.Y.2d 473 (N.Y. 1963) is a landmark U.S. case on conflict of laws.

A husband and wife from New York went on a car trip with a friend Babcock to Ontario. While in Ontario they had a motor vehicle accident. Babcock sued Jackson, the driver, claiming his negligence caused the car crash.

This case brought up a question of 'choice of law'; if the law of the place of residence of the accident victims (New York) be applied, or, should the law of the place of the tort (Ontario) be applied. Under the old conflict rules, the law of the place of the accident should apply. However, Ontario had a law that prohibited passengers from suing the driver.

The court rejected a traditional fixed method of determining which law should apply, and instead, a process of weighing factors such as relationship between the party, decision to take the trip, connections to the locality. Thus, the Court held that the parties did not have substantial connection with Ontario and so it would be unfair to apply the law as the location was largely fortuitous. The Court found that the jurisdiction with the most connections was New York and so New York law should apply.
