= 1962 New York state election =

- November 6, 1962

The 1962 New York state election was held on November 6, 1962, to elect the governor, the lieutenant governor, the state comptroller, the attorney general, a judge of the New York Court of Appeals and a U.S. senator, as well as all members of the New York State Assembly and the New York State Senate.

== Background ==
Judge Charles W. Froessel would reach the constitutional age limit of 70 years at the end of the year.

== Nominations ==
The Socialist Labor state convention met on April 1, and nominated again the same ticket as in 1958, headed by Eric Hass for Governor.

The Democratic state convention met from September 16 to 18 at Syracuse, New York, and nominated U.S. Attorney for the Southern District of New York Robert M. Morgenthau for governor on the second ballot over Frank D. O'Connor, Samuel S. Stratton, Howard J. Samuels, James Farley, and Abraham Beame. They also nominated Mayor of Binghamton John J. Burns for lieutenant governor; Manhattan Borough President Edward R. Dudley for attorney general; attorney New York City School Board president James B. Donovan for the U.S. Senate; and re-nominated the incumbent Comptroller Arthur Levitt.

The Republican state convention met on September 19 at Buffalo, New York, and renominated the incumbents Rockefeller, Wilson, Lefkowitz and Javits; and completed the ticket with John P. Lomenzo for Comptroller and New York Supreme Court Justice Marcus G. Christ for the Court of Appeals.

The Liberal Party met on September 19, and endorsed the Democratic ticket.

The Socialist Workers Party nominated a full slate, and filed a petition to nominate candidates.

The Conservative Party selected on July 13 David H. Jaquith to run for governor. They filed a petition to nominate candidates which was challenged by the Republicans. On October 1, the Republican State Chairman L. Judson Morhouse announced that his party dropped the suit, and the ticket went on the ballot.

== Result ==
Four Republicans and two Democrat/Liberals were elected.

The incumbents Rockefeller, Wilson, Levitt, Lefkowitz and Javits were re-elected.

1962 state election results
Office	Republican ticket		Democratic ticket		Liberal ticket		Conservative ticket		Socialist Workers ticket		Socialist Labor ticket	
Governor	Nelson A. Rockefeller	3,081,587	Robert M. Morgenthau	2,309,743	Robert M. Morgenthau	242,675	David H. Jaquith	141,877	Richard Garza	19,698	Eric Hass	9,762
Lieutenant Governor	Malcolm Wilson	3,081,587	John J. Burns	2,309,743	John J. Burns	242,675	E. Vernon Carbonara	141,877	Sylvia Weinstein	19,698	John Emanuel	9,762
Comptroller	John P. Lomenzo	2,363,102	Arthur Levitt	2,883,064	Arthur Levitt	271,100	Thomas D. Cole	99,971	Allen Taplin	20,068	Milton Herder	9,019
Attorney General	Louis J. Lefkowitz	3,111,072	Edward R. Dudley	2,194,584	Edward R. Dudley	214,069	Frederick S. Dennin	99,464	Leroy McRae	21,086	(none)	
Judge of the Court of Appeals	Marcus G. Christ	2,653,995	John F. Scileppi	2,469,760	John F. Scileppi	244,394	(none)		(none)		(none)	
U.S. Senator	Jacob K. Javits	3,269,417	James B. Donovan	2,113,772	James B. Donovan	175,551	Kieran O'Doherty	116,151	Carl Feingold	17,440	Stephen Emery	7,786

Note: The vote for governor is used to define ballot access, for automatic access are necessary 50,000 votes.

== See also ==
- New York gubernatorial elections
- New York state elections

== Notes ==
Vote totals from New York Red Book 1963
