= 1969 New York state election =

- November 4, 1969

The 1969 New York state election was held on November 4, 1969, to elect a judge of the New York Court of Appeals.

On May 20, 1969, Judge Kenneth B. Keating resigned, and was appointed U.S. Ambassador to India.

== Nominations ==
On August 30, Governor Nelson A. Rockefeller recommended to the Republican State Committee the nomination of the Presiding Justice of the Appellate Division (Third Dept.) James Gibson for the Court of Appeals.

On September 4, Gibson was nominated by the Republican, Democratic and Conservative state committees. The Liberal Party refused to endorse Gibson or any other candidate.

On September 15, Governor Rockefeller appointed Gibson to fill the vacancy temporarily.

== Result ==
The incumbent Gibson was re-elected.

1969 state election result
Office	Republican		Democratic	Conservative
Judge of the Court of Appeals	James Gibson	4,003,762	James Gibson	James Gibson

== See also ==
- New York state elections
- 1969 New York City mayoral election
