= James Gibson (judge) =

American judge

James Gibson (1902 in Salem, Washington County, New York – May 29, 1992, in Glens Falls, Warren County, New York) was an American lawyer and politician.

== Life ==
He graduated from Princeton University in 1923. Then he studied law privately and attended Albany Law School for one year. He was admitted to the bar in 1926, and practiced law in Hudson Falls, New York. He married Judith Angell, and they had two daughters. In 1935, he was elected District Attorney of Washington County, a position his father had also held. During World War II, he served as a captain in the United States Army.

In 1952, he was elected to the New York Supreme Court (4th District), and re-elected in 1966. He sat on the Appellate Division (3rd Dept.) from 1956 to 1969. He was Presiding Justice from 1964 on.

In 1964, the phrase "under God" in the Pledge of Allegiance was challenged as a violation of the constitutional separation of church and state. On the appellate bench, Gibson ruled that the phrase was legal. His decision was upheld by the New York Court of Appeals and the United States Supreme Court declined to review the decision, effectively leaving Justice Gibson's ruling as the law of the land.

On September 15, 1969, Gibson was appointed by Governor Nelson A. Rockefeller to the Court of Appeals to fill the vacancy caused by the resignation of Kenneth Keating. In November 1969, he was elected unopposed to succeed himself. He retired from the Court of Appeals at the end of 1972 when he reached the constitutional age limit of 70 years and returned to the Supreme Court as a certificated trial justice until 1978. Afterwards he resumed the practice of law at Hudson Falls.

He died at Glens Falls Hospital.

== Sources ==
- The History of the New York Court of Appeals, 1932-2003 by Bernard S. Meyer, Burton C. Agata & Seth H. Agata (pages 27f)
- Court of Appeals judges
- History of the Third Department, with portrait (page 26)
- James Gibson, 90, Former Judge On New York's High Court, Dies in NYT on June 1, 1992
