= Charles D. Breitel =

American lawyer and politician (1908–1991)

Chief Judge of the New York Court of Appeals
- In office January 1, 1974 – December 31, 1978
- Preceded by: Stanley Fuld
- Succeeded by: Lawrence Cooke

Personal details
- Born: December 12, 1908 New York City, New York, U.S.
- Died: December 1, 1991 (aged 82) New York City, New York, U.S.
- Party: Republican
- Education: University of Michigan; Columbia University

Charles David Breitel (December 12, 1908 – December 1, 1991) was an American lawyer and politician from New York. He was Chief Judge of the New York Court of Appeals from 1974 to 1978.

== Private life ==
He was the son of Harry Herman Breitel (born on 10 Apr 1873, in Lemberg, Austro-Hungarian Empire, now Lviv, Ukraine) and Regina D. Breitel (née Zuckerberg, born in Austria). His parents had 4 children, 3 of which were born in Austria: Sadie (1889–1990), Lillian (born on 10 June 1897 in Lemberg), Ethel Ettie (born 1905 in Austria), and Charles David (born on December 12, 1908, in New York City). His father died in 1911. His family was Jewish.

He attended the public schools in New York City. On April 9, 1927, 19-year-old Charles married 18-year-old Jeanne S. Hollander (1909–1996), who was also to become a lawyer. He earned a bachelor's degree from the University of Michigan in 1929, and a law degree from Columbia University Law School.

The Breitels have had two daughters: Eleanor (Breitel) Alter (1938–), a lawyer in Manhattan; and Vivian Hollander Breitel (1945–), who lives in Houston, Texas.

== Career ==
From 1934 to 1950, he worked for Thomas E. Dewey. While Dewey was, successively, New York City's Special Prosecutor of Rackets, District Attorney of New York County, briefly in private law practice, and from 1943 on Governor of New York, Breitel was Assistant D.A., Dewey's law partner, and Counsel to the Governor.

In 1950, Dewey appointed him a justice of the New York Supreme Court to fill the vacancy caused by the death of Samuel Null. In December 1950, Dewey re-appointed Breitel to the Supreme Court to fill the vacancy caused by the resignation of Ferdinand Pecora. In November 1951, he was elected on the Republican and Democratic tickets to a 14-year term, and re-elected in 1965. He was on the Appellate Division from 1952 to 1966.

In January 1967, he was appointed a judge of the New York Court of Appeals to fill the vacancy caused by the election of Stanley H. Fuld as Chief Judge. In November 1967, he was elected to a 14-year term. In November 1973, he was elected on the Republican and Liberal tickets Chief Judge of the Court of Appeals, defeating Democrat Jacob D. Fuchsberg and Conservative James J. Leff.

As Chief Judge, he was a strong proponent of changing the way of choosing the Court of Appeals' judges from popular election, which had been the system since its establishment in 1846, to having them appointed by the Governor and confirmed by the New York State Senate. New York State voters approved the constitutional amendment.

He retired from the bench at the end of 1978 when he reached the constitutional age limit of 70 years. His successor as Chief Judge was Lawrence H. Cooke, appointed by Governor Hugh L. Carey in 1979.

== Death ==
He had a stroke in September 1990, and two months later entered the Mary Manning Walsh Nursing Home in Manhattan where he died of heart failure the next year, aged 82.

== Sources ==
- Listing of Court of Appeals judges, with portrait
- Pace, Eric (December 3, 1991). "Charles D. Breitel, Chief Appeals Judge in 1970's". The New York Times.

Legal offices
Preceded by Stanley Fuld	Chief Judge of the New York Court of Appeals; 1974–1978	Succeeded by Lawrence Cooke
