= Courtroom =

Enclosed space in which a judge regularly holds court

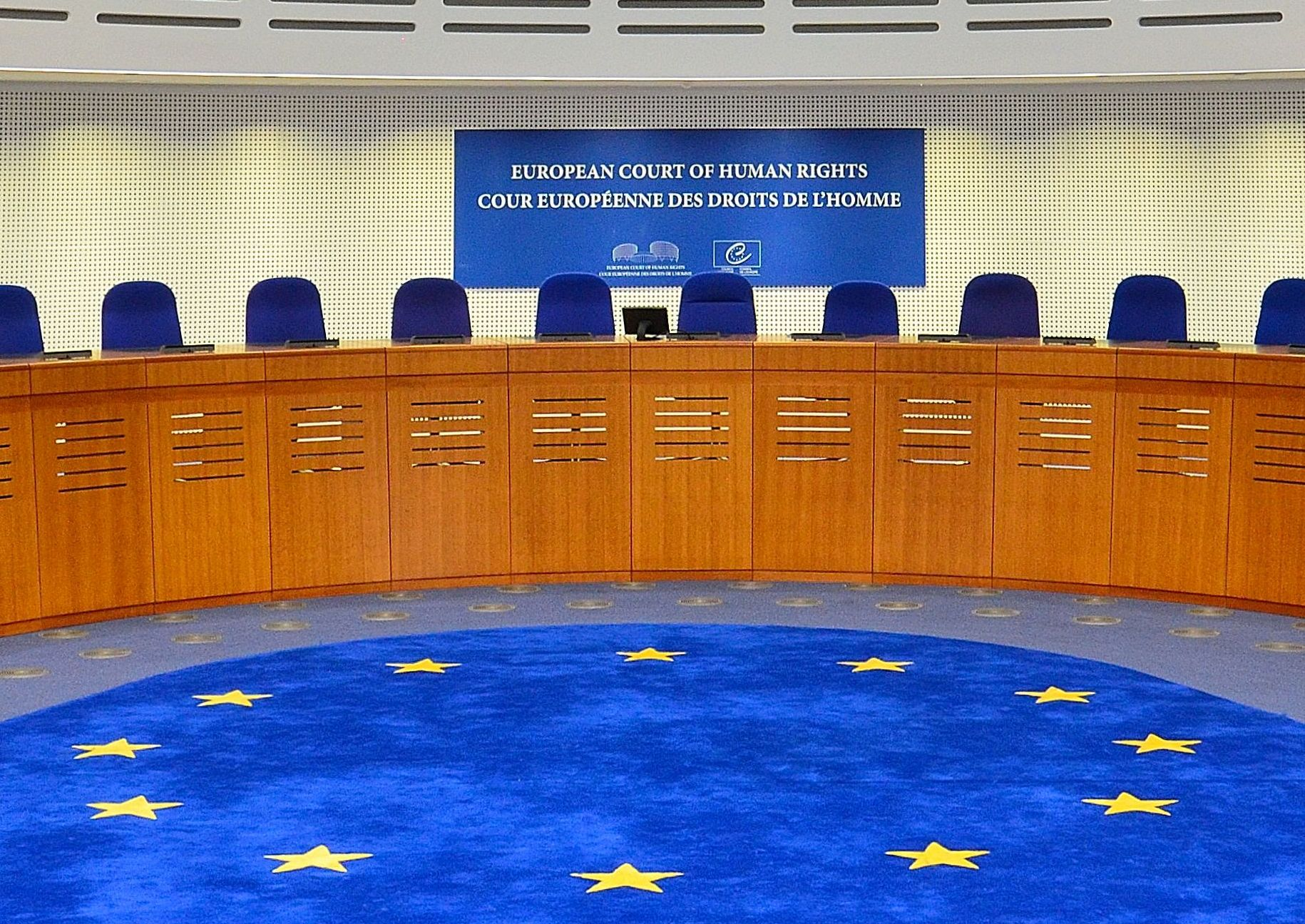
European Court of Human Rights (Strasbourg).

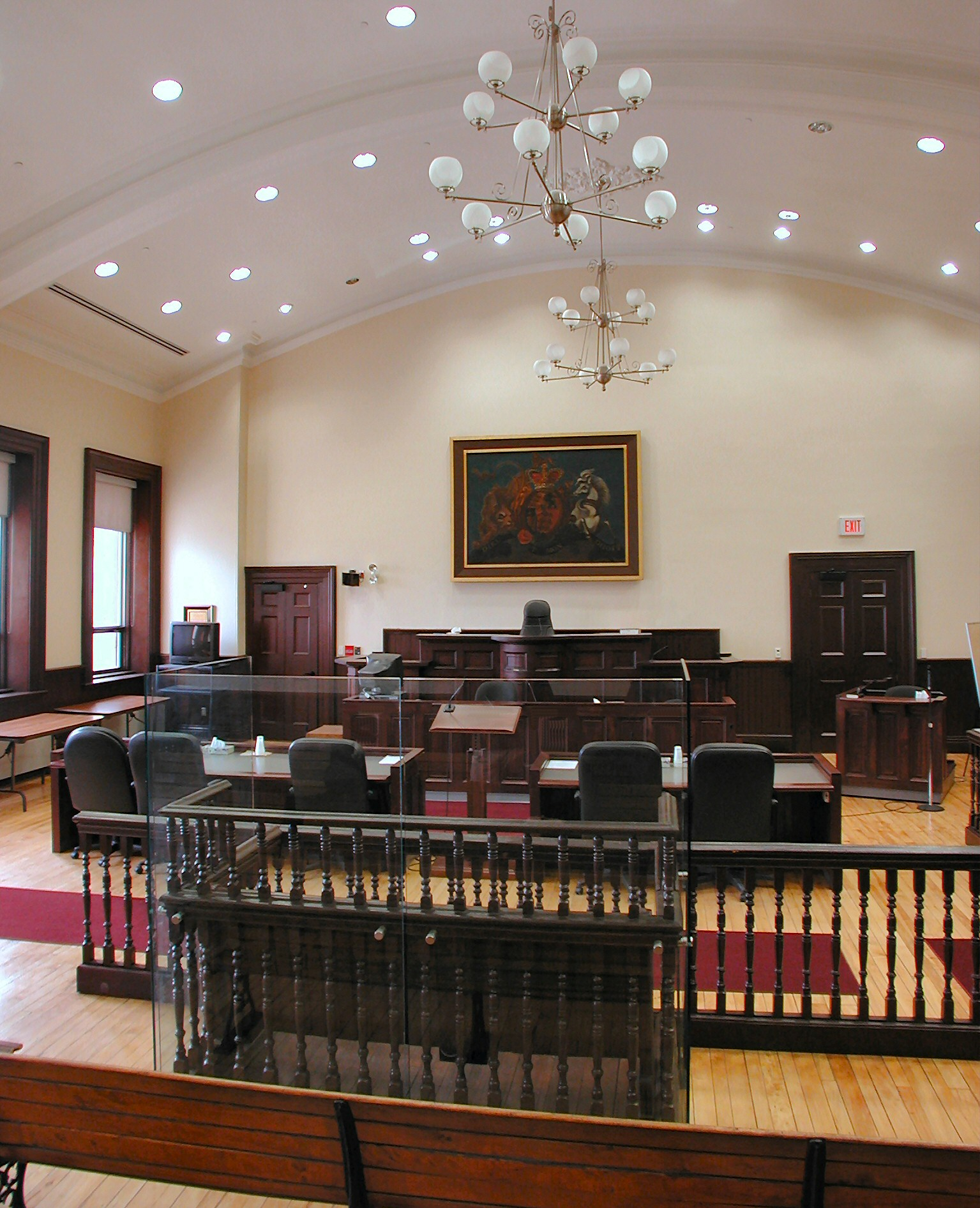
Historic courtroom still in use in Brockville, Canada

A courtroom is the enclosed space in which courts of law are held in front of a judge. A number of courtrooms, which may also be known as "courts", may be housed in a courthouse. In recent years, courtrooms have been equipped with audiovisual technology to permit everyone present to clearly hear testimony and see exhibits.

== Ancient history ==
Historically, judicial proceedings were frequently held in public spaces. In Ancient Rome, judicial proceedings took place in a variety of settings, and buildings exclusively reserved for use as courthouses did not develop.

In medieval Europe, courts similarly operated in a variety of locations, and judicial proceedings could be designated to be conducted outdoors, near trees, rocks, crosses, and other landmarks, or within churches, castles, palaces, and civic buildings, reflecting the strength of local institutions as well as practical considerations.

== By country ==
=== Ireland ===
Irish legal tradition is inherited from English tradition and so an Irish courtroom has a similar setup to the English/Welsh model. The judge (or judges, in the Supreme Court and Special Criminal Court or some High Court cases) sits on a raised platform at the top of the court and wears a white collar (also called tabs) and a black gown; they do not wear a wig and do not use a gavel. The Irish national arms, a Celtic harp, is on the wall behind the judge, where the royal arms would be in a British court. The court registrar sits in front of the judge and administers oaths and deals with paperwork. The solicitors are at the front of the registrar, and the jury (if it is a jury trial) sits in a box to one side. The accused sits at the other side with a prison officer. A judicial assistant does legal research for the judge; they also announce when the judge enters of leaves the courtroom (usually by saying ‘all rise’, or in Irish 'seasaigí'). Witnesses give testimony in a witness box to one side of the judge. Barristers are seated facing the judge, and the public and press behind them. Barristers also wear black robes and a white collar, and may wear a wig if they wish. All proceedings are recorded by a Digital Audio Recording (DAR) box. Irish court cases are not televised; one exception was a 2017 broadcast of some Supreme Court decisions.

=== United States ===
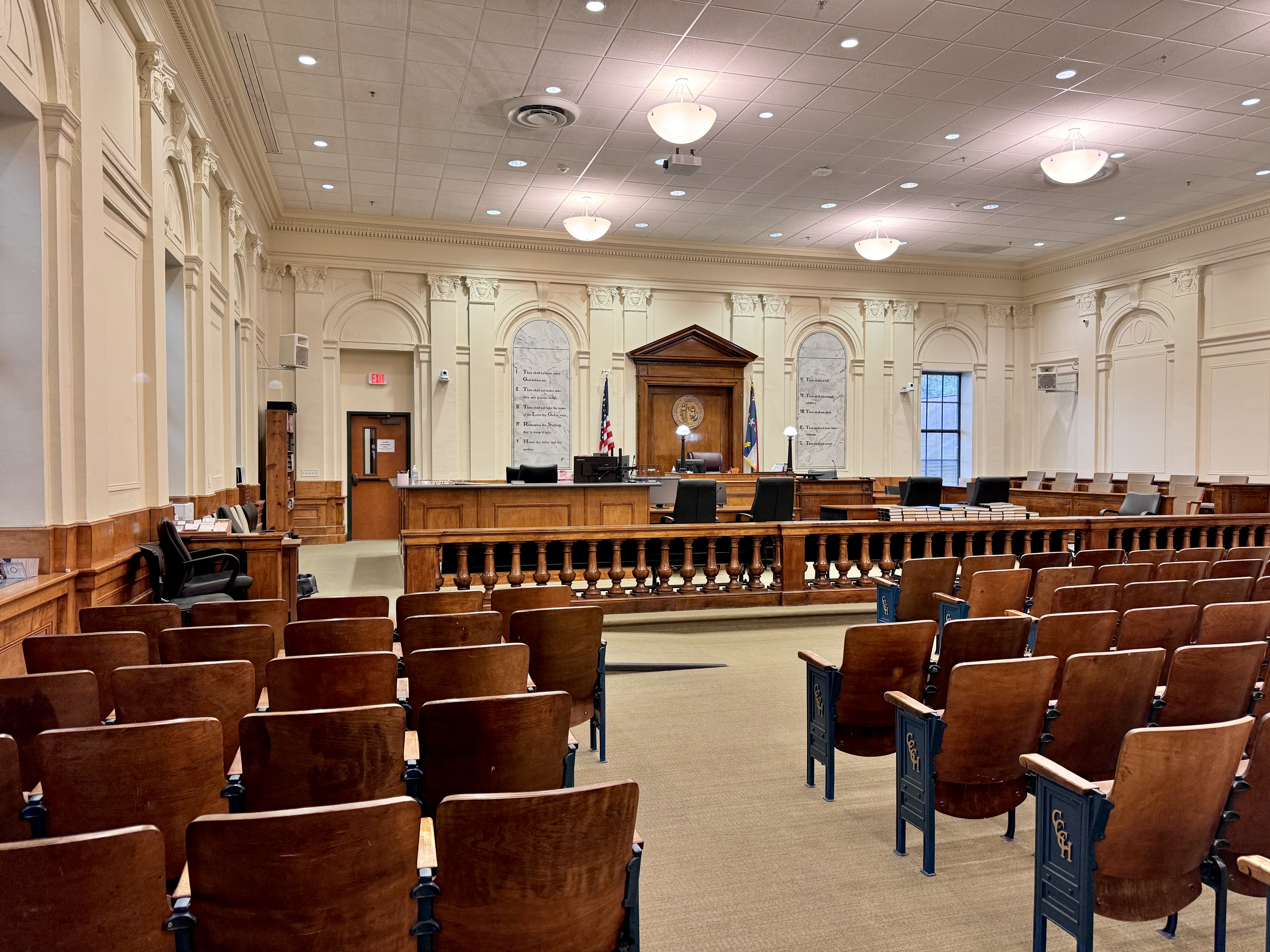
A courtroom at the Cherokee County Courthouse in North Carolina, United States

A courtroom is traditionally entered through heavy double doors, "to suggest that this is not an ordinary public building".

The judge generally sits behind a raised desk, known as the bench. A court clerk or bailiff traditionally signals the commencement of a formal court hearing with the words: "All rise, the [court name] is now in session, the Honorable [judge name] presiding." The judge generally enters from a door near the bench and sits in a large chair behind the bench.

Behind the judge are the seal of the jurisdiction and the flag of the United States. A court operated by a state or territorial government also includes that government's flag. Judges usually wear a plain black robe (a requirement in many jurisdictions). An exception was the late U.S. Supreme Court Chief Justice William Rehnquist, who broke tradition by adorning his robe with four gold stripes on each sleeve. (Rehnquist reportedly said that he had been inspired to add the stripes by his having seen such stripes worn by the character of the judge, in a local production of the Gilbert and Sullivan comic operatic spoof of English jurisprudence, Trial by Jury.)

Adjacent to the bench are the witness stand and the desks where the court clerk and the court reporter sit. The courtroom is divided into two parts by a barrier known as the bar. The bar may be an actual railing, or an imaginary barrier. The bailiff stands (or sits) against one wall and keeps order in the courtroom. Apart from the parties to the case and any witnesses, only the lawyers can literally pass the bar (court personnel and jury members usually enter through separate doors), and this is the reason why the term the bar has come to refer to the legal profession as a whole (see bar association).

On one side of the bar is the judge's bench, the tables for the plaintiff, the defendant, and their respective counsel, and a separate group of seats known as the jury box where the jury sits. Traditionally, there is one table for the plaintiff and plaintiff's counsel and another table for the defendant and defense counsel, both facing the bench, with an open space in between counsel tables and the bench. The jury box is positioned at a 90-degree angle against one wall.

There is usually a podium or lectern between the two tables where the lawyers may stand when they argue their case before the judge. However, in many busy courtrooms, the lawyers normally argue from the tables for their respective sides. They take the additional time to move to and from the podium only for the most important appearances, such as jury trials.

In the Commonwealth (and many other countries), a courtroom used for trials of criminal cases often has a dock: a space exclusively reserved for seating a criminal defendant. It is marked off with a barrier, like the jury box and the witness stand. As late as the 1970s, some American courtrooms also had docks, but they gradually fell out of use. Defendants argued that they were prejudicial and interfered with the accused's right to counsel, since defense attorneys were traditionally seated at the table for defense counsel and were not normally allowed to sit next to the dock.

There is usually an open space between the bench and the counsel tables, because of the court clerk and court reporter's tables in front of the bench and the jury box on the side. This space is called the well. It is considered extremely disrespectful to the court for persons who are not court employees to directly "traverse the well" without permission—that is, to walk directly toward the bench across the well—and some courts have rules expressly forbidding this for the safety of the judge. Instead, if documents need to be given to or taken from the judge, attorneys are normally expected to approach the court clerk or bailiff, who acts as an intermediary. During trials, attorneys will ask the court's permission to traverse the well or "approach the bench" for "sidebar" conferences with the judge.

On the other side of the bar is the gallery, with benches and chairs for the general public. In some cases the gallery is separated from the rest of the room by bulletproof glass.

All of the above applies only to trial courts. Appellate courts in the United States are not finders of fact, so they do not use juries or receive evidence into the record; that is the trial court's job. Therefore, in an appellate court, there is neither a witness stand nor a jury box, and the bench is much larger to accommodate multiple judges or justices.

The walls are often partially or completely wood-paneled. This is a matter of style and tradition, but some jurisdictions have elected to construct courtrooms with a more modern appearance. Some courtroom settings are little more than a closed-circuit television camera transmitting the proceedings to a correctional facility elsewhere to protect the court from violent defendants who view the proceedings on television within a jail conference room and are allowed duplex communications with the judge and other officers of the court. Many courtrooms are equipped with a speaker system where the judge can toggle a switch to generate white noise during sidebar conversations with the attorneys so that the jury and spectators cannot hear what is being discussed off-record.

Multiple courtrooms may be housed in a courthouse. The schedule of official court proceedings is called a docket.

=== United Kingdom ===
==== England and Wales ====
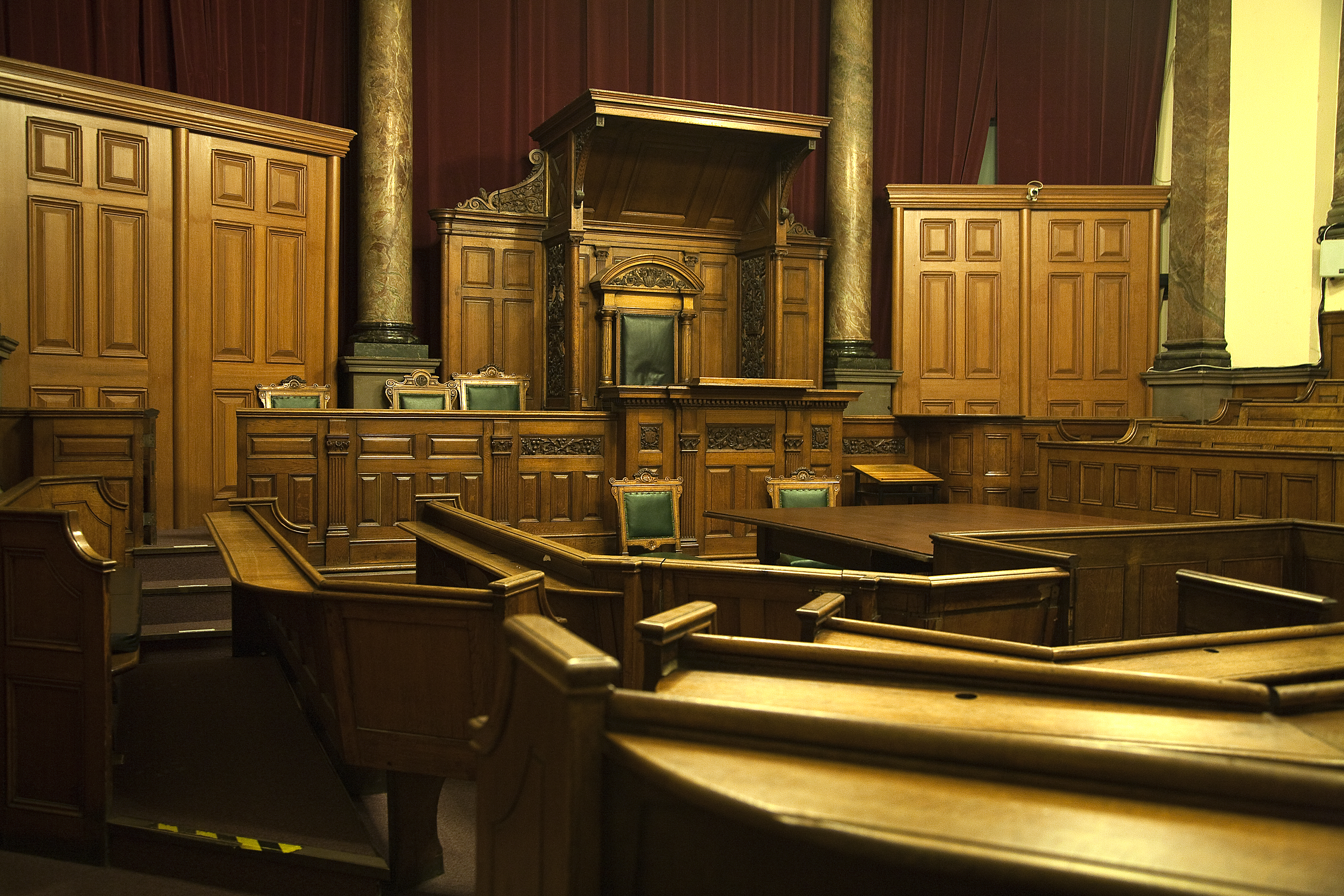
A nineteenth century English courtroom in Nottingham, United Kingdom, now preserved as a museum

Before the fifteenth century, courts of England and Wales generally did not sit in dedicated courtrooms. Many of them operated as circuit courts, such as the assizes, for which there was no reason to build a specialized room which would remain vacant except when the king's judges were in town. Instead, courts convened in large multi-purpose rooms (often the largest in their respective settlements) and used very simple furniture, because those rooms needed to be frequently reconfigured for a variety of other public proceedings and entertainments.

Historically, the only table before the bench (in the well of the court) was a large clerk's table. By the end of the eighteenth century, as barristers began to take an active role in trials, they started to sit at the central table, and then that was reduced to a small clerk's table while separate seating was developed for barristers and solicitors. The development of dedicated courtrooms led to an evolution from the fluid and chaotic courtroom of the fifteenth century to a "much more static space" in which architecture was used to expressly delineate "bounded and discrete" areas reserved for various legal actors. The eighteenth century also saw the development of early courthouses, in the sense of buildings which were dedicated to housing courtrooms along with offices for the various officers of the court.

Modern courtrooms vary considerably in their layout, reflecting the history and development of the building. Some historic courtrooms remain in use and are generally wood-panelled; most newer courtrooms are not panelled and generally have a modern appearance. Depending on the layout of the room, a claimant may sit on either the right or left in a civil court, just as the prosecution may sit on either side (usually the opposite side to the jury) in a criminal court.

In British courtrooms, a witness testifies from a witness-box, rather than the American "witness stand".

In a criminal court, where the defendant is held in custody prior to court appearance, the defendant will be escorted by the security firm that has the contract to serve that court. In rare circumstances in civil trials a bailiff or someone else charged to keep order may be present (for example if a tenant who is due to be evicted for violent behaviour or a defendant arrives in court drunk). Unless prevented by disability, advocates are expected to address the court standing up, from the position where they were seated before addressing the court.

Appellate courts may hear evidence (and also be finders of fact) as well as review legal argument. In such cases witness evidence may be necessary, and many appellate courts therefore have witness stands. Courtrooms for hearings of the Family Court which consider matters such as custody of children and divorce are generally smaller and more informal in layout than those for criminal and civil proceedings, as are courtrooms used by tribunals.

The Royal Coat of Arms is placed above and behind the judge or presiding magistrates to symbolise the fact that trials in England and Wales are carried out in the name of The Crown. The only exceptions to this are in the City of London courts where the judge or magistrate sits below the arms of the City of London as well as the Crown, a historic anomaly. In England and Wales the Royal Coat of Arms is displayed prominently over the main external entrance to the courthouse.

==== Scotland ====
As in other countries, the judge or sheriff sits on the bench. Directly below the bench is the clerk's station which usually has a computer to allow the clerk to get on with Court Disposal work during proceedings.

Directly in front of the clerk is the well of court which has a semi-circular table at which all the advocates sit during proceedings. The Procurator Fiscal or Advocate Depute always sits in the seat at the right of the clerk during criminal proceedings.

Behind the well of the court is the dock in which the accused will sit during proceedings. Dependent on the style of the courtroom, the jury box will either be on the right or left hand side of the well of the court. Scotland is unique in the western world in that it has 15 jurors.

Usually to the right or left of the bench (again dependent on style and always directly opposite the jury) slightly raised and facing forward is the stand where any witness who is called will give evidence. The stand is designed so that any solicitor examining a witness as well as the judge/sheriff may get a good view of the testimony. At the far side of the courtroom directly opposite the jury box and behind the stand are seats for journalists who are attached to the court and the court social worker. Seats for members of the public are the back of the courtroom.

There is no court reporter in Scotland; normal summary cases are simply minuted by the clerk indicating the disposal. If the case is a solemn (more serious) case involving a jury or if the case has a sexual element then proceedings will be tape recorded which is done under the supervision of the clerk. A High Court Noter is also in attendance to record witness evidence on behalf of the Crown.

Like in England and Wales, in Scotland the Royal Coat of Arms is placed above and behind the judge or presiding sheriffs to symbolise the fact that trials are carried out in the name of The Crown. However, the Scottish version (unicorn on viewer's left, motto Nemo Me Impune Lacessit, etc.) is always used. The arms also appears prominently over the main external entrance to the courthouse.

=== Gallery ===
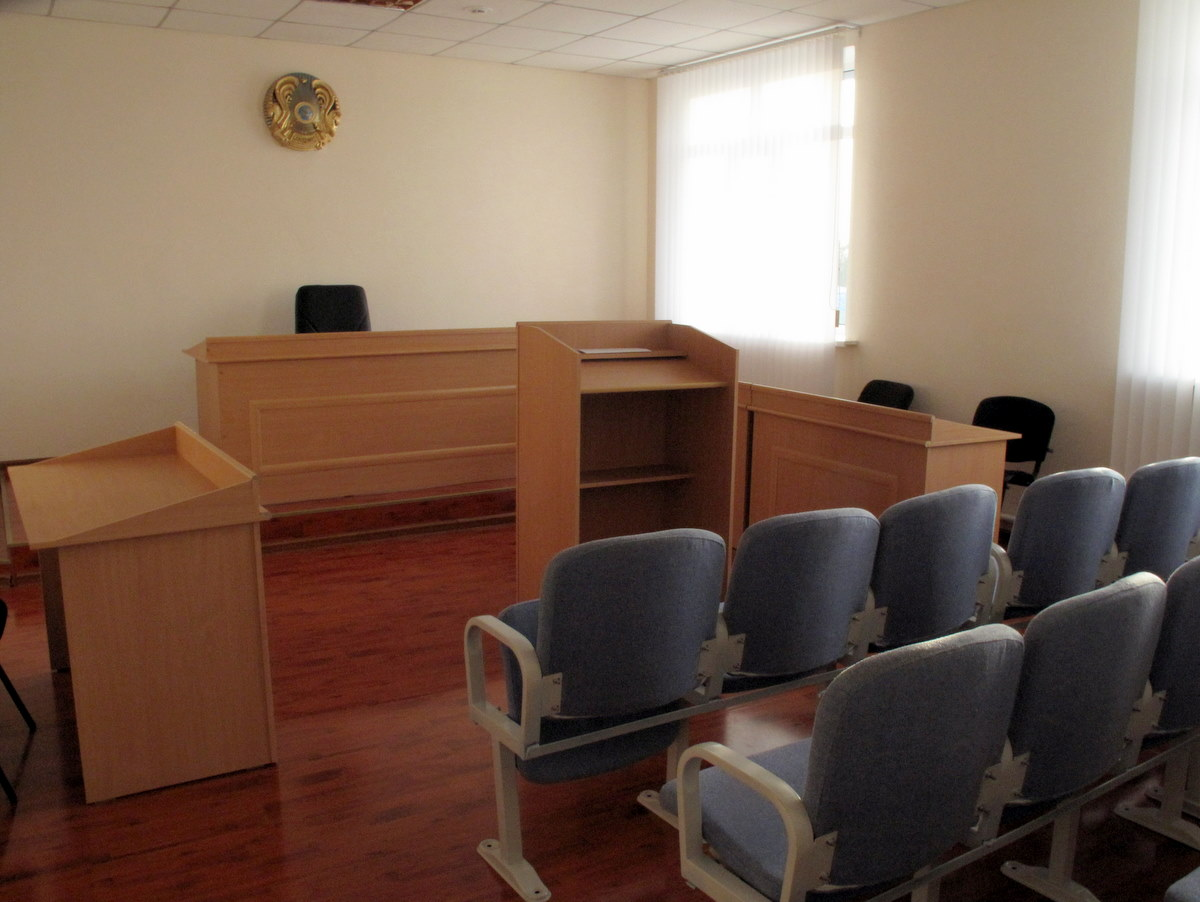
Courtroom in Kazakhstan

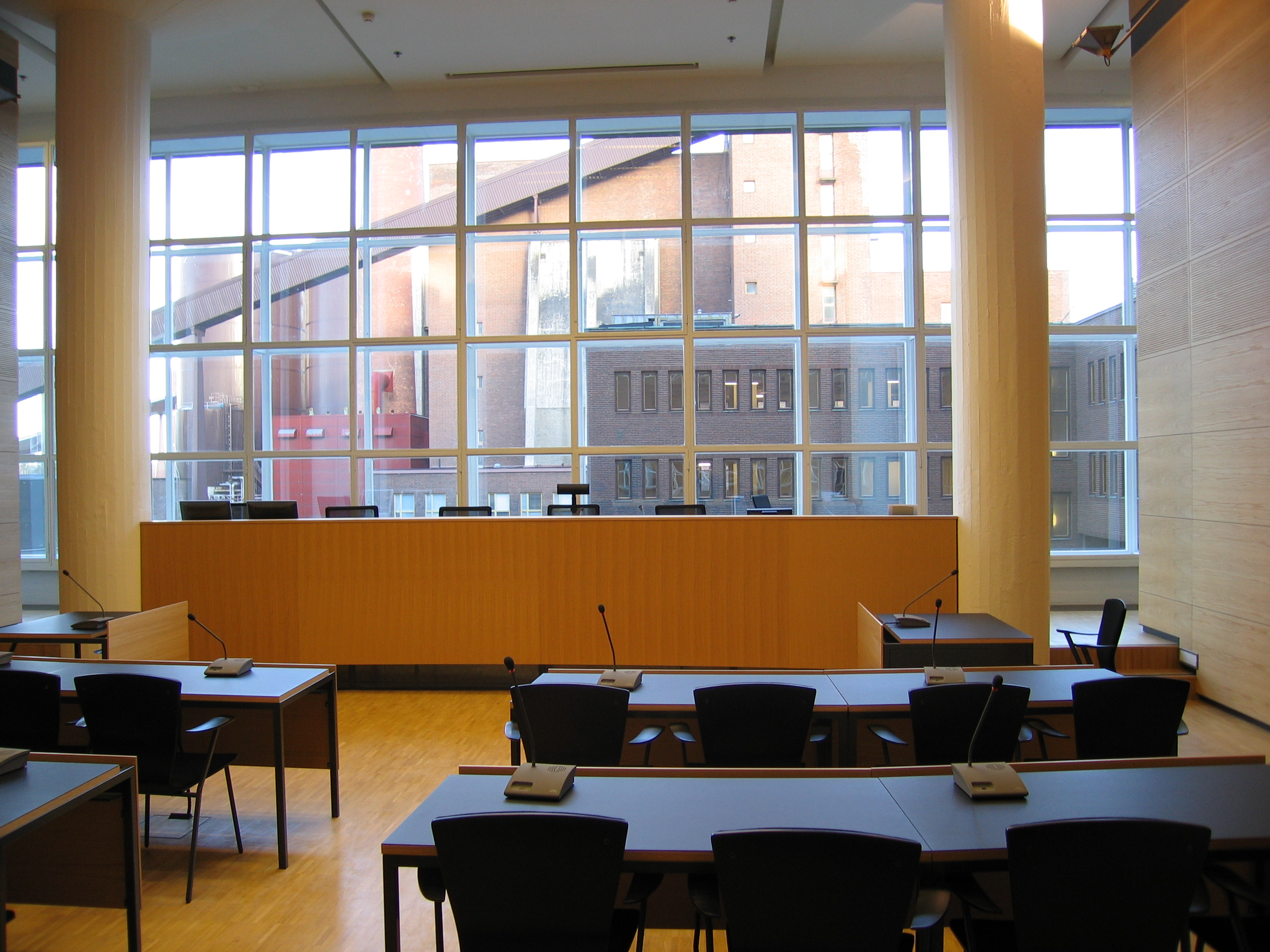
Courtroom in Helsinki, Finland, used by the Helsinki District Court

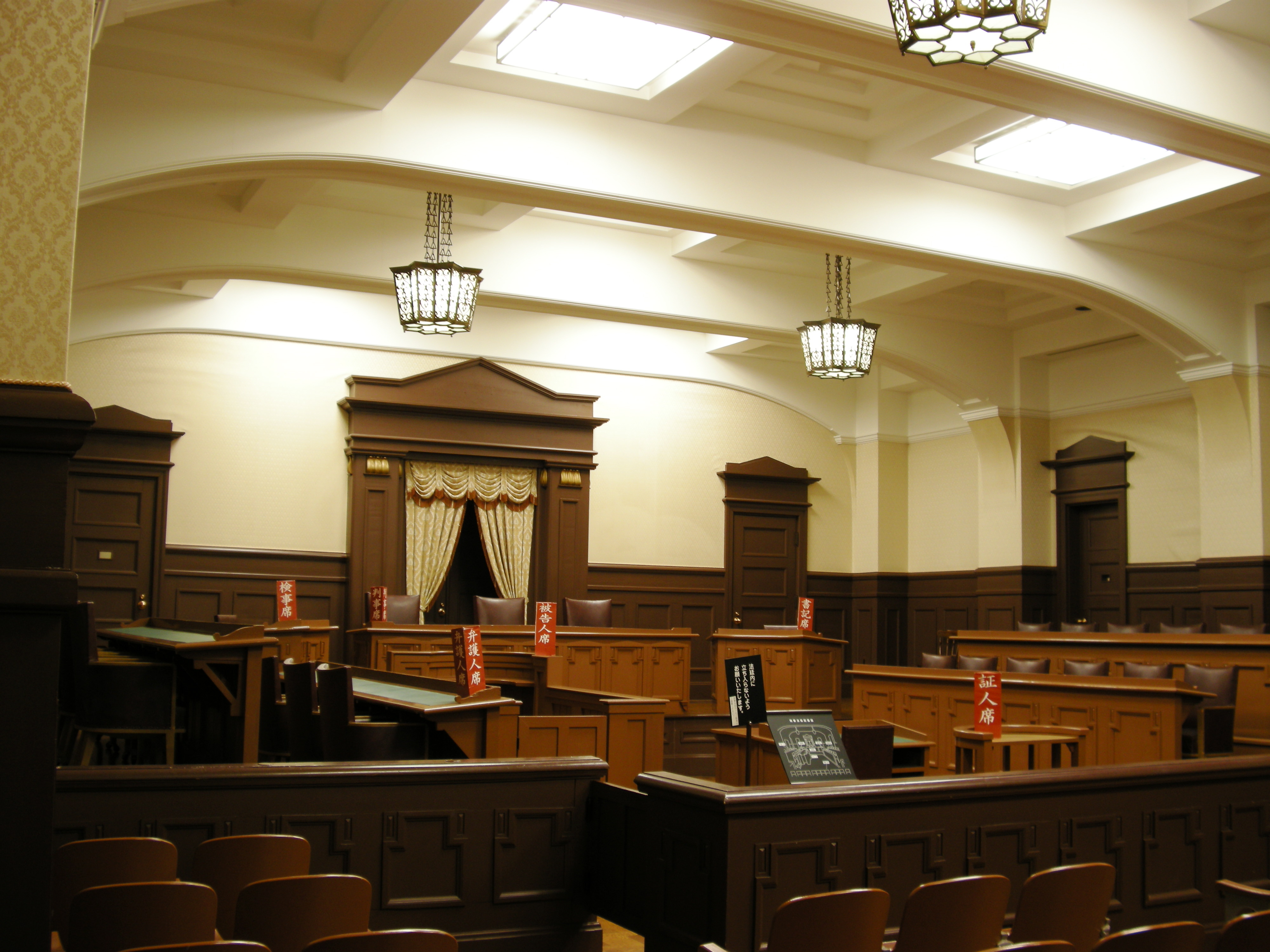
Courtroom in Kyoto, Japan, used by the Kyoto District Court

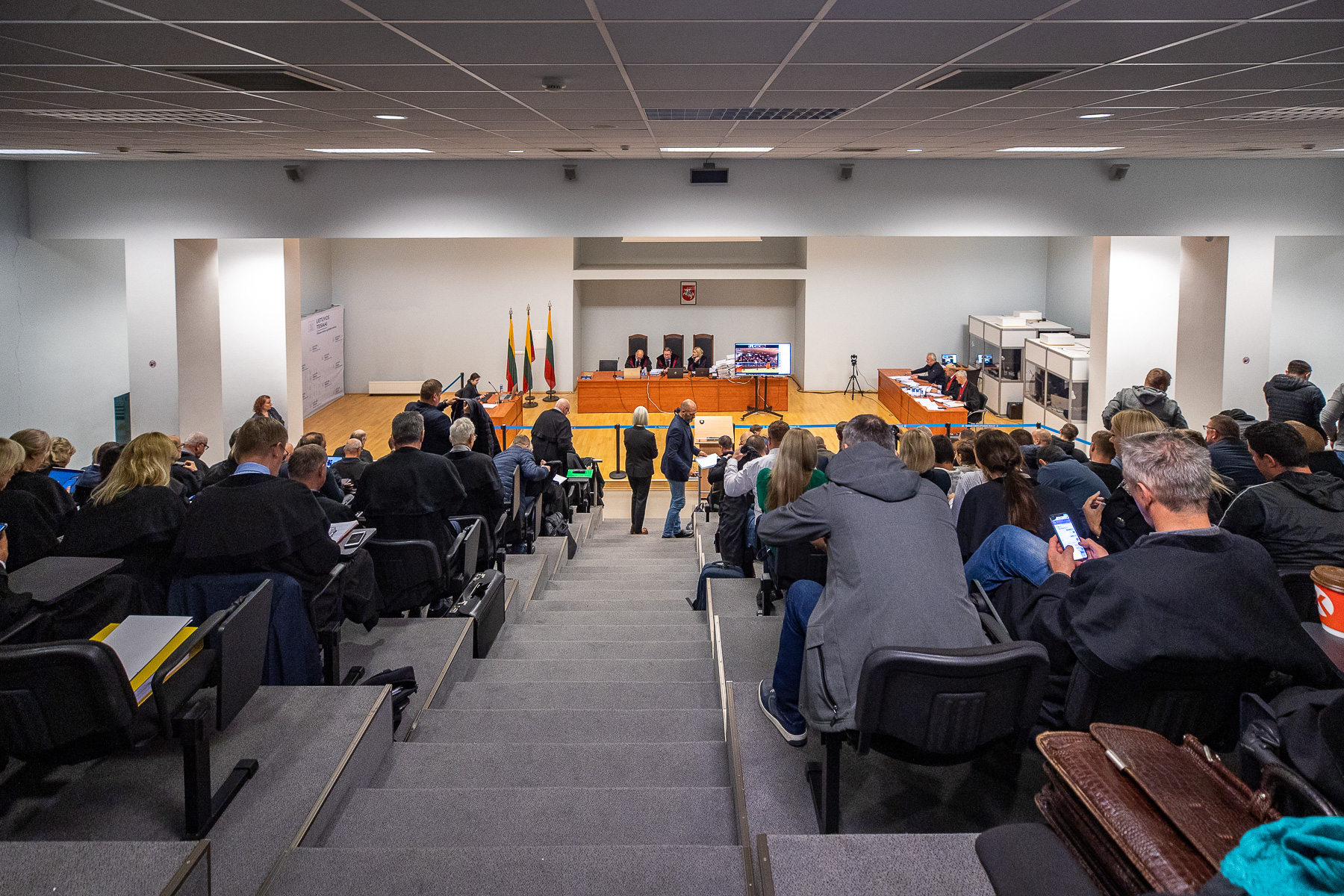
Courtroom in Vilnius, Lithuania, used by the Vilnius City District Court

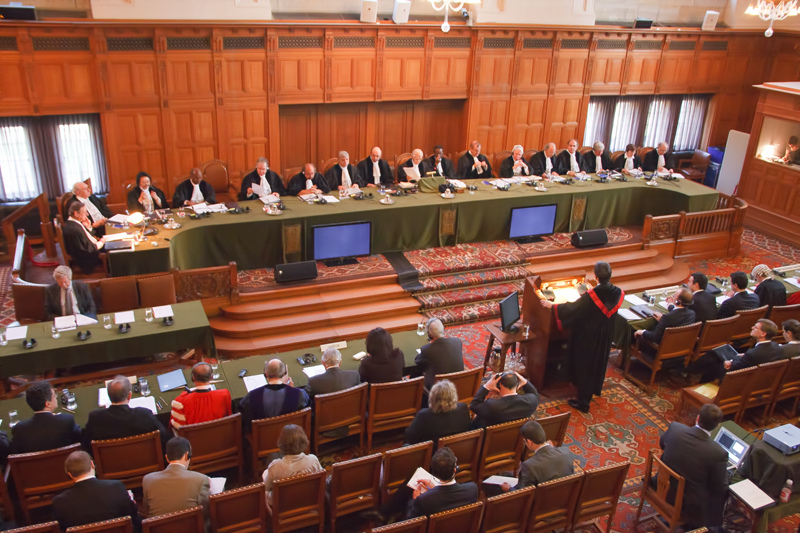
International Court of Justice (The Hague)

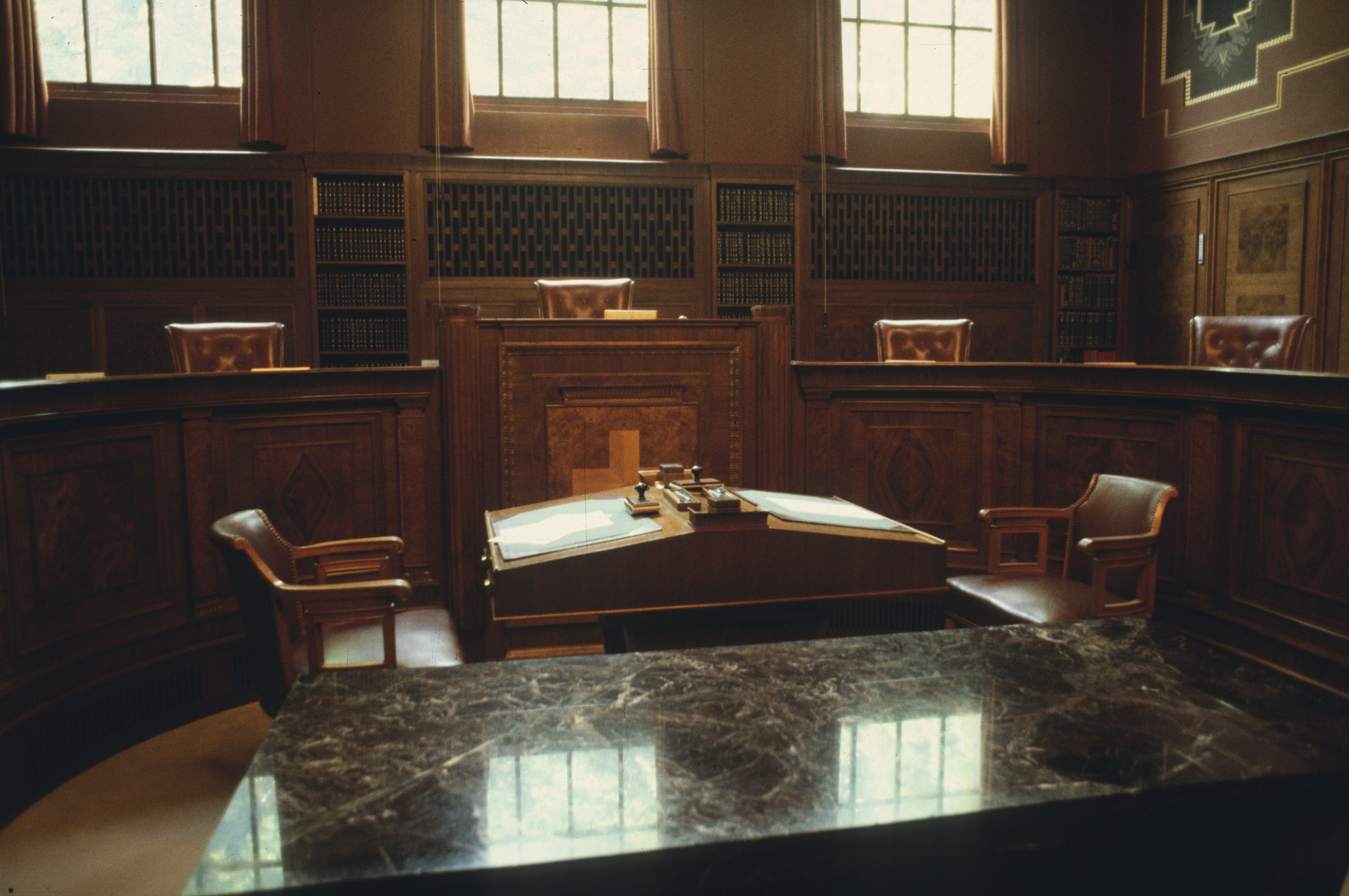
The Federal Supreme Court of Switzerland

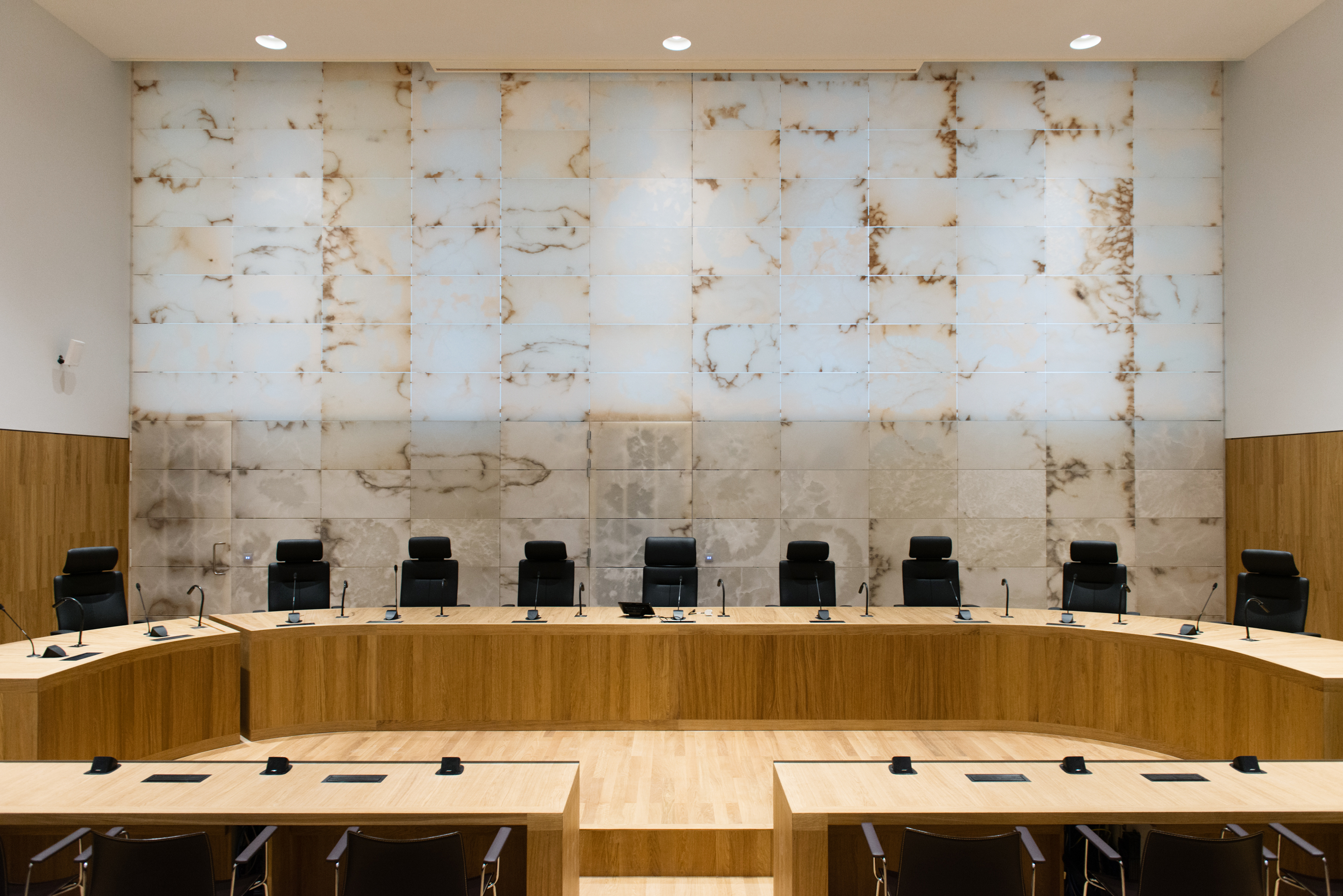
The Supreme Court of the Netherlands
