= Davies v Mann =

Davies v. Mann
- Court: Exchequer of Pleas
- Citation: 152 Eng. Rep. 588 (1842)

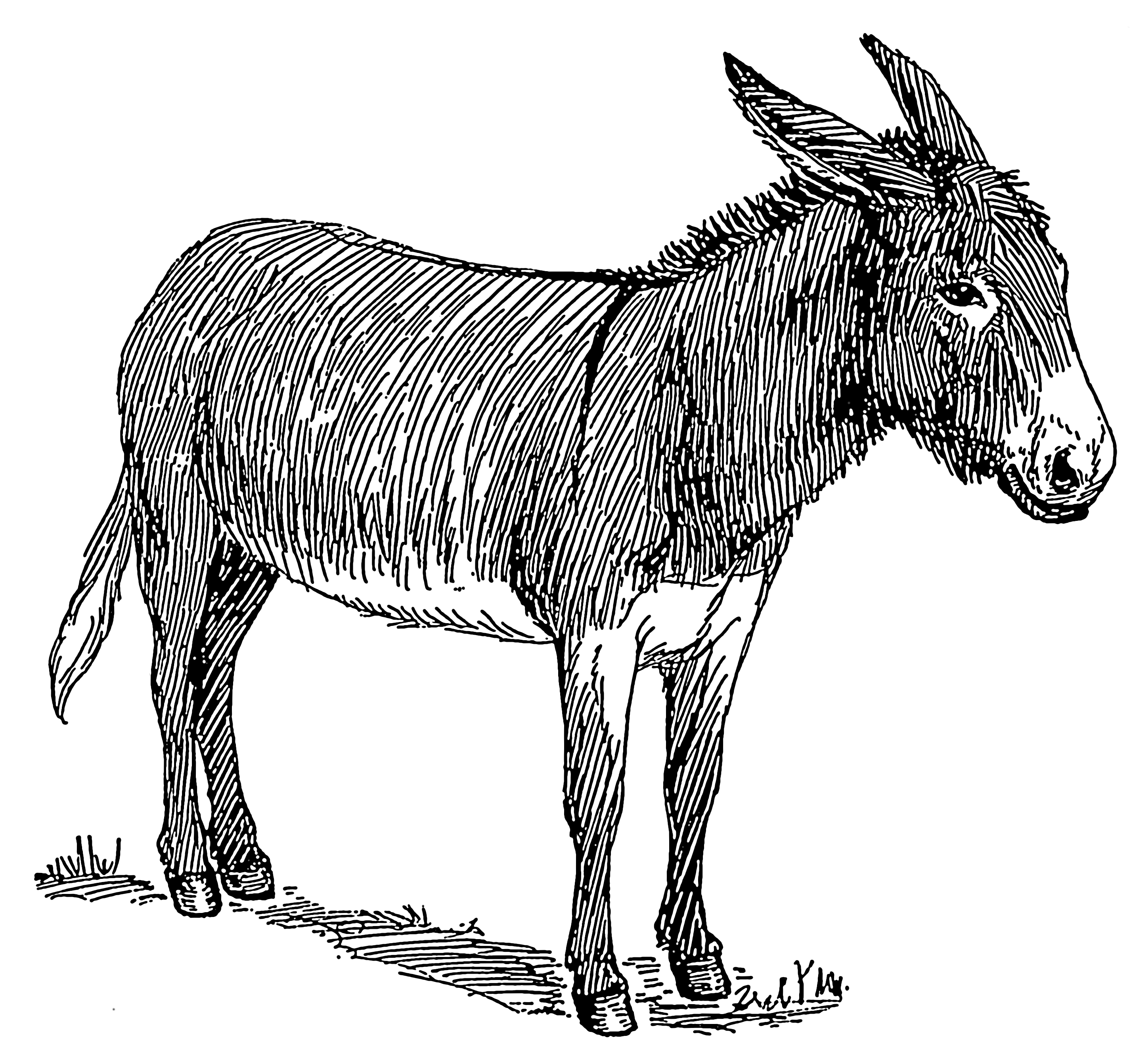
A wagon accident involving a hapless donkey had significant reverberations in tort law.

Davies v. Mann, 152 Eng. Rep. 588 (1842), was an English case that contained the first formulation of the "last clear chance" or “last opportunity rule” doctrine in negligence law.

The case concerned an accident in which a donkey, belonging to the plaintiff, was killed after a wagon, driven by the defendant, collided with it. The plaintiff had left the donkey on the side of the road while it was fettered, which was contributory negligence. However, the plaintiff was still allowed recovery.

The court ruled that since the defendant had an opportunity to avoid the accident by driving with reasonable care (as opposed to driving too quickly at a "smartish pace"), the defendant's negligence really caused the accident.

The doctrine became known as the "last clear chance" or "last opportunity rule" doctrine. If the defendant did not take the opportunity of using reasonable care to take the last clear chance to avoid injury, the contributory negligence of the plaintiff is not a bar to recovery.

== Case law ==
- Butterfield v Forrester
- May v Burdett
- Paris v Stepney BC
- Winterbottom v Wright
