= Paris v Stepney BC =

1950 House of Lords case

Paris v Stepney Borough Council
- Court: House of Lords
- Full case name: Paris v Mayor, etc., of Metropolitan Borough Of Stepney
- Decided: 13 December 1950
- Citation: [1951] AC 367,

Court membership
- Judges sitting: Lords Simonds, Normand, Oaksey, Morton of Henryton and MacDermott

Keywords
- Negligence

Paris v Stepney Borough Council [1950] UKHL 3 was a decision of the House of Lords that significantly affected the concept of Standard of care in common law. The plaintiff Paris was employed by the then Stepney Borough Council as a general garage-hand. He had sight in only one eye, and his employer was aware of this. The council only issued eye protection goggles to its employees who were welders or tool-grinders. In the course of his usual work, Paris received an injury to his sighted eye. He sued the council for damages in the tort of negligence. On appeal it was decided that Stepney Borough Council was aware of his special circumstances and failed in their duty of care to give him protective goggles.

== Facts ==
Paris was employed by Stepney Borough Council as garage-hand. He had suffered a war injury that left him with sight in only one eye. While Paris was attempting to loosen a rusted car axle bolt with a hammer, he caused a chip of metal to fly into his sighted eye, and as a result was permanently blinded in both eyes.

== Case law ==
- Butterfield v Forrester
- Davies v Mann
- May v Burdett
- Winterbottom v Wright
