= Antommarchi Rights =

In People v. Antommarchi, 80 NY2d 247 (1992), the statutory rights of a defendant to be present during any sidebar questioning of a prospective juror concerning his or her impartiality was affirmed by the New York Court of Appeals. Such rights are generally known as the Antommarchi Rights.
