= Butterfield v Forrester =

Butterfield v. Forrester, 11 East. 60, 103 Eng. Rep. 926 (K.B. 1809), was an English case before the King's Bench that was the first appearance of contributory negligence as a common law defence against negligence.

== Facts ==
Forrester (D) placed a pole against the road next to his house in the course of making repairs to the house. Butterfield (P) was riding at a high speed at approximately 8 pm at twilight and did not see the pole. He struck the pole and suffered personal injuries when he fell off his horse. A witness testified that visibility was 100 yards away at the time of the accident and Butterfield might have seen and avoided the pole had he not been riding at such a high speed. There was no evidence that Butterfield had been intoxicated at the time of the accident. At trial, the judge instructed the jury that if an individual riding with reasonable care could have avoided the pole, and if the jury found that Butterfield had not used reasonable care, the verdict should be in Forrester's favour. The jury returned a verdict for Forrester and Butterfield appealed.

== Decision ==
The court determined that the plaintiff had failed to use common and ordinary caution, and he was therefore barred from recovery.

== Case law ==
- Davies v Mann
- May v Burdett
- Paris v Stepney BC
- Winterbottom v Wright
