= Losee v. Clute =

American legal case

Losee v. Clute, 51 N. Y. 494 (1873), was a seminal case in American tort law. Losee involved a third party injured by an exploding boiler who was found to have no claim against the manufacturer of the boiler; this case closely followed Loop v. Litchfield.

== Background ==
Defendant Clute manufactured a boiler, knowing at the time that the purchaser was to use it adjacent to dwelling houses and stores. The purchaser tested the boiler to its satisfaction and accepted it. After three months of use—during which time defendants had nothing whatever to do with the boiler, and had no care or management of it—the boiler exploded and damaged the adjacent property. The injured plaintiffs alleged that the boiler had been negligently manufactured, and sued on the theory that this breached a duty.

== Procedural history ==
Appeal from the judgment of the General Term of the Supreme Court in the fourth judicial district. The appeal affirmed the judgment entered upon an order dismissing the plaintiff's complaint on the trial. The case is now in the Commission of Appeals of New York (treated equally with Court of Appeals)

== Held ==
In the opinion of the court it was said:

"When the boiler was accepted, they [the defendants] ceased to have any further control over it or its management, and all responsibility for what was subsequently done with it devolved upon the company and those having charge of it." It was declared that the case came within the principle that "at the most an architect or builder of a work is answerable only to his employes for any want of care or skill in the execution thereof, and he is not liable for accidents or injuries which may occur after the execution of the contract," and that the defendants owed to the plaintiff no duty whatever at the time of the explosion "either growing out of contract or imposed by law."

Boilers are not inherently dangerous

- like wheels, see Loop v. Litchfield
- unlike belladonna (Thomas v. Winchester)
