= Hugh R. Jones =

American judge

Associate Judge of the New York Court of Appeals
- In office 1972–1984

Personal details
- Born: March 19, 1914 New Hartford
- Died: March 3, 2001 (aged 86) Utica, New York
- Spouse: Jean McMillen
- Children: 5
- Education: Hamilton College; Harvard Law School

Military service
- Branch/service: United States Navy
- Battles/wars: World War II
- Awards: Bronze Star Medal with Combat V

Hugh Richard Jones (March 19, 1914, New Hartford, Oneida County, New York – March 3, 2001, Utica, Oneida Co., NY) was an American lawyer and politician.

== Life ==
He graduated from Hamilton College in 1935, and then taught mathematics at the American University in Cairo. He graduated from Harvard Law School in 1939, was admitted to the bar, and commenced practice in Utica. He married Jean McMillen, and they had five children.

During World War II, he served in the United States Navy, and was awarded a Bronze Star Medal with Combat V. After the war, he resumed his law practice in Utica.

He served on the New York State Board of Social Welfare, and was appointed Chairman by Governor Nelson A. Rockefeller in 1964. In 1972, he was President of the New York State Bar Association.

In 1972, he was elected on the Republican and Conservative tickets to the New York Court of Appeals. He retired from the Court of Appeals at the end of 1984 when he reached the constitutional age limit of 70 years. Afterwards he resumed the practice of law with the firm of Hiscock & Barclay in Syracuse, New York, retiring in 1992.

Jones served as chair of the New York Commission on Judicial Nomination from 1992 until 1998.

In New York v. Onofre, a 1980 decision that found the law against sodomy between consenting adults to be unconstitutional, Jones wrote for the 5-to-2 majority: "It is not the function of the penal law to provide for the enforcement of moral or theological values."

Jones was active in the Episcopal Church, serving as Chancellor of the bishops of the Diocese of Central New York. He also earned a Doctor of Divinity degree from the General Theological Seminary in Manhattan in 1974.
