= May v Burdett =

May v. Burdett, 9 Q.B. 101 (1846), was an English case argued decided before the Queen's Bench that ruled a plaintiff injured by a dangerous animal kept by the defendant had a prima facie case for negligence even without a showing that the defendant had been negligent in securing the animal.

== Case law ==
- Butterfield v Forrester
- Davies v Mann
- Paris v Stepney BC
- Winterbottom v Wright
