= Loop v. Litchfield =

Loop v. Litchfield 42 N. Y. 351 (1870) was a part of the historic line of cases holding that the privity requirement barred a products liability action unless the product in question was "inherently dangerous."

== Facts ==
A manufacturer negligently made a small balance wheel for use on a circular saw. The manufacturer pointed out the defect in the wheel to the buyer, who wished to purchase a cheap article and was willing to assume the risk of the defect. The buyer then loaned the saw to a neighbor who used it and, five years after the manufacture, was killed when the wheel flew apart.

== Held ==
The court held the manufacturer not liable.

- The court distinguished Thomas v. Winchester and advanced a theory that conditioned liability on the "imminently dangerous" nature of the object in question. The issue was whether a particular defective product was "inherently dangerous"—the manufacturer only owed duty to the lessee if the danger was an imminent one -- "The vendor of an article of his own manufacture is not liable to one who uses the same, with the consent of the purchaser, for injuries resulting from a defect therein, unless such article is, in its nature, dangerous.
- The court ruled that a flywheel in a machine was not such an object. The court explained: "Poison is a dangerous subject. Gunpowder is the same. A torpedo is a dangerous instrument, as is a spring gun, a loaded rifle, or the like." But the flywheel, like "an ordinary carriage wheel, a wagon axle, or the common chair in which we sit," was not inherently dangerous, so the privity requirement applied and the injured plaintiff could not recover from the manufacturer. In the sale of a mislabeled poison, "[t]he injury . . . was a natural result of the act," but in the case of a defective flywheel, "[t]he bursting of the wheel and the injury to human life was not the natural result or the expected consequence of the manufacture and sale of the wheel."

== Subsequent court cases ==
Three years later, in Losee v. Clute, the plaintiff was injured by a defective steam boiler; the court decided that this, too, was an ordinary object, not an inherently dangerous one."
