= Francis Bergan =

American lawyer and politician (1902–1998)

Francis Bergan (April 20, 1902 Albany, New York – March 23, 1998 Albany, NY) was an American lawyer and politician.

== Life ==
He was the son of Michael Bergan and Mary Bergan. He was educated at the New York State College for Teachers. Then he worked as a court reporter for the Knickerbocker Press, and studied law. He graduated LL.B. from Albany Law School in 1923, and was admitted to the bar in 1924. He was elected to the Albany City Court in 1929, and to the Albany Police Court in 1933.

In 1935, he was elected to the New York Supreme Court (3rd District), and re-elected in 1949. He was a delegate to the New York State Constitutional Convention of 1938. While sitting on the Supreme Court, he attended night classes at Siena College and graduated B.A. in 1946. Two years later, Siena conferred an LL.D. on him. He sat on the Appellate Division (3rd Dept.) from 1949 to 1963. He was Presiding Justice from 1960 on.

In 1963, he was elected unopposed to the New York Court of Appeals. He was a delegate to the New York State Constitutional Convention of 1967, and was Chairman of the Committee on Education. In 1970, he wrote the opinion which was the court's decision in Boomer v. Atlantic Cement Co. He retired from the bench at the end of 1972 when he reached the constitutional age limit of 70 years. Afterwards he published many writings on legal issues and the State court system, among them The History of the New York Court of Appeals 1847-1932 (Columbia University Press, 1985).

He died at the Teresian House, a nursing home in Albany.

== Sources ==
- The History of the New York Court of Appeals, 1932-2003 by Bernard S. Meyer, Burton C. Agata & Seth H. Agata (pages 25f)
- Court of Appeals judges
- History of the Third Department, with portrait (page 27)
- Francis Bergan, 95, Ex-Judge; Shaped New York's Constitution in NYT on April 13, 1998
