= Jacob D. Fuchsberg =

American lawyer and politician (1913–1995)

Associate Judge of the New York Court of Appeals
- In office January 1, 1975 – December 31, 1983

Personal details
- Born: June 14, 1913 New York City, U.S.
- Died: August 27, 1995 (aged 82) Port Chester, New York

Jacob David Fuchsberg (June 14, 1913, Manhattan, New York City – August 27, 1995, Port Chester, Westchester County, New York) was an American lawyer and politician. He was elected to the Court of Appeals as an associate judge in 1974, and retired from the position in 1983.

== Life ==
He graduated from New York University School of Law in 1936, and commenced practice as a trial lawyer in New York City. In 1938, he married Shirley Cohen, and they had four children. In 1950, he established a law firm, Fuchsberg & Fuchsberg, with his brother Abraham.

From 1957 to 1959, he was President of the New York State Trial Lawyer Association, and from 1963 to 1964 President of the American Trial Lawyer Association (ATLA). From 1965 on, he was President of the Roscoe Pound-ATLA Foundation.

In 1973, he filed a petition to challenge the Democratic designees in a primary election to be nominated for Chief Judge of the New York Court of Appeals. He won the primary, but was defeated in the general election by Republican/Liberal Charles D. Breitel.

In 1974, he challenged again the Democratic designees in a primary election to be nominated for the New York Court of Appeals, and defeated Judge Harold A. Stevens. In the general election, he defeated again Stevens who ran on the Republican, Conservative and Liberal tickets, although the New York City Bar Association had urged the voters to defeat Fuchsberg. Fuchsberg was the first judge in the history of the Court to be censured for misconduct after a special court convened by Chief Judge Breitel found that he traded in New York City securities without recusing himself from cases about the city's finances.

As a judge, Fuchsberg was viewed as a liberal on criminal issues and frequently voted for the defendant in divided cases. He and Judge Bernard S. Meyer were described by the Legal Aid Society as "the most defense oriented" judges on the Court. During his tenure, Fuchsberg led a mass resignation of judges from the University Club of Albany in protest of the club's refusal to admit women as members. In 1983, the club began admitting women, and the judges reapplied for membership.

Fuchsberg resigned from the bench in May 1983, holding his farewell dinner at the University Club. He resumed the practice of law at a new firm, the Jacob D. Fuchsberg Law Firm, which he started with his children Rosalind and Alan as well as other attorneys including Irwin Brownstein.

He served on the Board of Trustees of New York University and Touro College. He assisted in the establishment of the Touro Law school which was named in his honor as "Touro College Jacob D. Fuchsberg Law Center."

On August 27, 1995, he felt dizzy at his home in Harrison, New York, and was brought by ambulance to the United Hospital in Port Chester where he died from cardiac arrest.

== Family ==
He was "survived by his wife of 57 years," and their four children, ten grandchildren, and four great-grandchildren. Fuchsberg's surviving siblings included a sister and three brothers, two of whom (Abraham and Seymour) were partners in Fuchsberg & Fuchsberg.

== Sources ==
- The History of the New York Court of Appeals, 1932-2003 by Bernard S. Meyer, Burton C. Agata & Seth H. Agata (page 29)
- Court of Appeals judges
- Jacob D. Fuchsberg, 82, Dies; Lawyer and Appellate Judge in NYT on August 28, 1995
- City Bar Unit, in Rare Act, Urges Fuchsberg's Defeat in NYT on October 25, 1974 (subscription required)
