= Sidebar (law) =

Legal concept

In the United States, the sidebar is an area in a courtroom near the judge's bench where lawyers may be called to speak with the judge so that the jury cannot hear the conversation or they may speak off the record. Lawyers make a formal request by stating, "May I approach the bench?" or, simply, "May I approach?" to initiate a sidebar conference. If it is granted, then opposing counsel must be allowed to come forward and participate in the conversation.

During the COVID-19 pandemic, several courts implemented a "wireless sidebar" where instead of having to physically approach the judge, the participants would use a wireless system to communicate with the judge without the jury hearing. This was notably used during the case of State v. Chauvin.

== See also ==
- Antommarchi Rights
