= Matthew J. Jasen =

American judge

Matthew Joseph Jasen (December 13, 1915 – February 4, 2006) was an American lawyer and politician.

== Life ==
Born in Buffalo, New York, he was the son of Joseph J. Jasen and Celine (Perlinski) Jasen. He graduated from Canisius College, and LL.B. from University at Buffalo Law School, and was admitted to the bar in 1940. He married Anastasia Gawinski (d. 1970), and they had four children.

He took a special wartime course at Harvard University's Civil Affairs Training School, and during the later part of World War II, was a Military Government Officer in Europe. After the war, he was President of the Security Review Board for Württemberg-Baden, and from 1946 to 1948 President of the Third Military Government Judicial District of Occupied Germany, with seat at Heidelberg. Afterwards he returned to Buffalo and practiced law.

In 1957, he was appointed by Governor W. Averell Harriman to the New York Supreme Court (8th District) to fill a vacancy. In November 1957, he was elected to a fourteen-year term.

In 1967, he was elected unopposed to the New York Court of Appeals. In 1978, his was one of the seven names on the list submitted to Governor Hugh L. Carey from which to choose the new Chief Judge, but Lawrence H. Cooke was selected. He retired from the Court of Appeals at the end of 1985 when he reached the constitutional age limit of 70 years.

Jasen died on February 6, 2006, in Orchard Park, New York.
