= Winterbottom v Wright =

19th-century English common law case

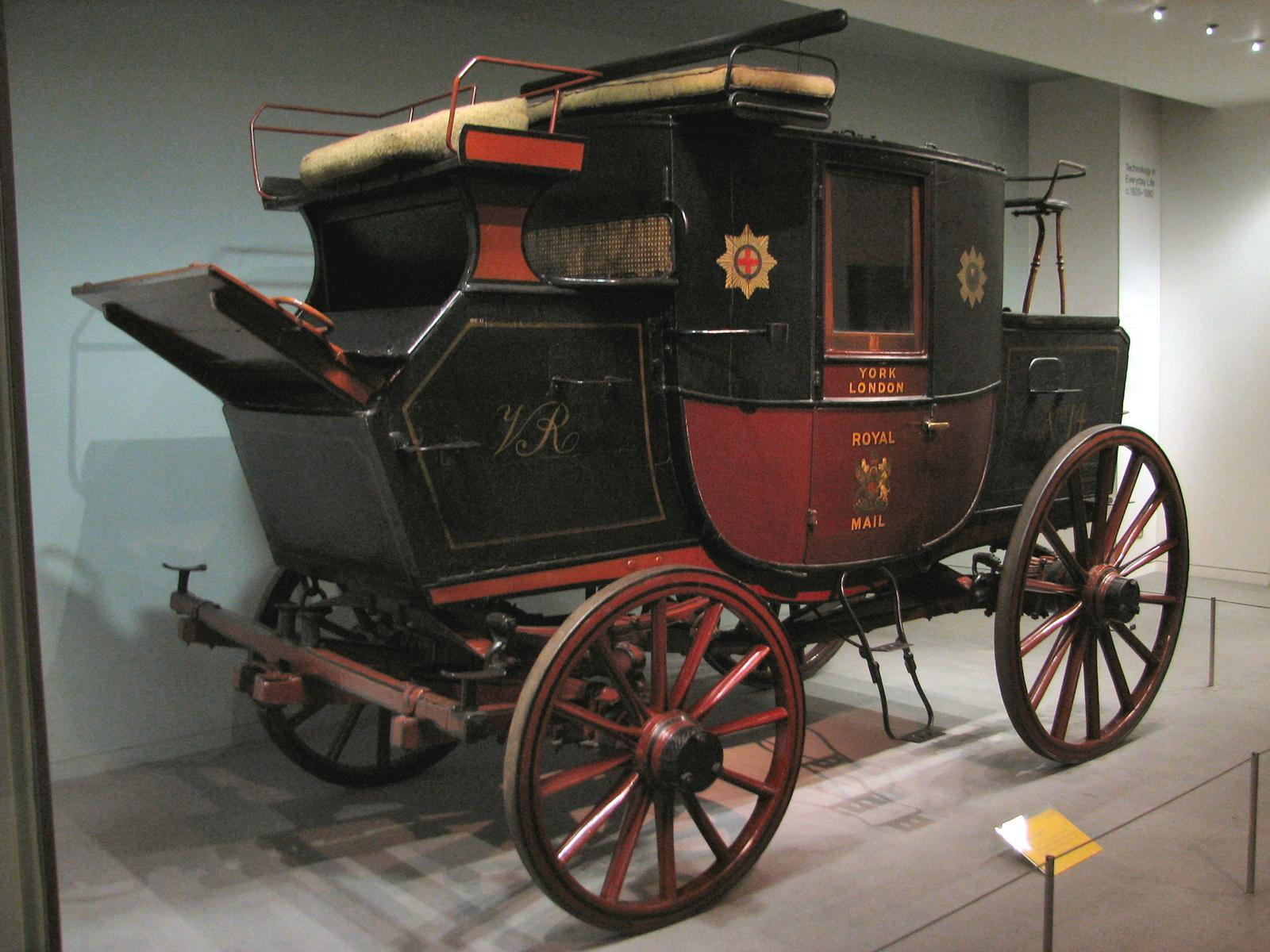
- Court: Exchequer of Pleas
- Full case name: Winterbottom v. Wright
- Decided: 6 June 1846
- Citations: (1842) 10 M&W 109; (1842) 152 ER 402

Case history
- Subsequent action: none

Court membership
- Judges sitting: Lord Abinger, Lord Chief Baron of the Exchequer Baron Alderson; Baron Gurney Baron Rolfe

Case opinions
- Abinger, Alderson and Rolfe BB gave judgments against the plaintiff, Gurney B concurring

Winterbottom v Wright (1842) 10 M&W 109 was an important case in English common law responsible for constraining the law's 19th-century stance on negligence.

== Facts ==
The plaintiff Winterbottom had been contracted by the Postmaster-General to drive a mail coach supplied by the Postmaster. The defendant Wright had been contracted by the Postmaster to maintain the coach in a safe state. The coach collapsed while Winterbottom was driving, and he was injured. He claimed that Wright had "negligently conducted himself, and so utterly disregarded his aforesaid contract and so wholly and negligently failed to perform his duty in this behalf."

In Winterbottom v Wright, the court held that the plaintiff had no redress. The principle of Winterbottom meant that consumers who were injured by defective products in the 19th century had no legal action against the defective execution of a contract to which they were not expressly privy, a doctrine referred to by legal scholars including P. H. Winfield as the "privity of contract fallacy".

== Judgment ==
In 1842, the law's only recognition of "negligence" was in respect of a breach of contract. As the plaintiff was not in a contract with the defendant, the court ruled in favour of the defendant on the basis of the doctrine of privity of contract.

Winterbottom sought to extend the ratio of the court in Langridge v Levy but the court rejected that on the grounds that that case involved a gun whose safety had been misrepresented by the vendor.

The case was also possibly influenced by public policy. If the plaintiff were able to sue," there would be unlimited actions" and the public utility of the Postmaster-General was such that allowing such actions would be undesirable for society.

== Significance ==
Though the Master of the Rolls, Sir William Brett sought to establish a general principle of duty of care in Heaven v. Pender (1883), his judgment was at variance with the majority of the court. The privity argument was subsequently rejected in common law in the United States in MacPherson v. Buick Motor Co. (1916) and finally in England by the doctrine of the "neighbour principle" in Donoghue v Stevenson (1932).

== Case law ==
- Butterfield v Forrester
- Davies v Mann
- May v Burdett
- Paris v Stepney BC
