= John F. Scileppi =

American judge

John Francis Scileppi (July 17, 1902, Corona, Queens, New York City – November 26, 1987, Stony Brook, New York, Suffolk County, New York) was an American lawyer and politician.

== Life ==
He was the son of Ignatius Scileppi and Nunzia Scileppi. He graduated from Newtown High School, and he earned an LL.B. from Fordham University School of Law in 1925. He was admitted to the bar in 1926. On January 30, 1929, he married Katherine I. Shea, and they had three children. He was Chief Deputy Clerk of Queens County from 1938 to 1939.

In 1939, he was elected to the Municipal Court of Queens County, and re-elected in 1949. In 1951, he was elected to the County Court of Queens County, and was designated to the New York Supreme Court.

In 1962, he was elected on the Democratic and Liberal tickets to the New York Court of Appeals. In 1963, he was the author of a controversial opinion that banned the sale in New York State of Tropic of Cancer, a novel by Henry Miller, on the ground that it was pornographic. Calling it "dirt for dirt's sake," he wrote that the book was "devoid of theme or idea" and that it contained "a constant repetition of patently offensive words used solely to convey debasing portrayals of natural and unnatural sexual experience." The United States Supreme Court later ruled that the book could not be banned.

He was a delegate to the New York State Constitutional Convention of 1967. He retired from the Court of Appeals at the end of 1972 when he reached the constitutional age limit of 70 years, and returned to the Supreme Court, at Riverhead, Long Island, as a certificated trial justice until 1976. Here he ruled in 1976 that a woman named Ellen Cooperman did not have the right to change her name to "Cooperperson." Saying that granting the request "would have serious repercussions perhaps throughout the entire country," the judge cited what he called "virtually endless and increasingly inane" possibilities, such as someone named "Jackson" seeking to become "Jackchild" or a woman named "Carmen" wanting to be "Carperson."

He died from a heart attack at the University Hospital in Stony Brook, Long Island, and was buried at the churchyard of St. James Roman Catholic Church in Setauket.

== Sources ==
- The History of the New York Court of Appeals, 1932–2003 by Bernard S. Meyer, Burton C. Agata & Seth H. Agata (page 25)
- Court of Appeals judges
- Ex-Judge John F. Scileppi, Author Of Opinion Banning Miller Novel Obit in NYT on November 28, 1987
