= MacPherson v. Buick Motor Co. =

1916 New York Court of Appeals case

- Court: New York Court of Appeals
- Full case name: Donald C. MacPherson v. Buick Motor Company
- Argued: January 24 1916
- Decided: March 14 1916
- Citation: 111 N.E. 1050, 217 N.Y. 382

Case history
- Prior history: Judgment for plaintiff, Sup. Ct.; aff'd, 160 A.D. 55 (3d Dep't 1914)

Holding
- An automobile manufacturer's liability for a defective product extended beyond the immediate purchaser. Appellate Division affirmed.

Court membership
- Chief judge: Willard Bartlett
- Associate judges: Frank H. Hiscock, Emory A. Chase, William H. Cuddeback, John W. Hogan, Benjamin N. Cardozo, Cuthbert W. Pound

Case opinions
- Majority: Cardozo, joined by Hiscock, Chase, Cuddeback
- Concurrence: (without separate opinion) Hogan
- Dissent: Bartlett
- Pound took no part in the consideration or decision of the case.

MacPherson v. Buick Motor Co., 217 N.Y. 382, 111 N.E. 1050 (1916) is a famous New York Court of Appeals opinion by Judge Benjamin N. Cardozo that removed the requirement of privity of contract for duty in negligence actions.

== Facts ==
The plaintiff, Donald C. MacPherson, a stonecutter, was injured when one of the wooden wheels of his 1910 Buick Runabout collapsed. The defendant, Buick Motor Company, had manufactured the vehicle but not the wheel, which had been manufactured by another party but installed by the defendant. It was conceded that the defective wheel could have been discovered upon inspection. The defendant denied liability because the plaintiff had purchased the automobile from a dealer, rather than directly from the defendant.

== Judgment ==
In the earlier precedent, duty had been imposed on defendants by voluntary contract via privity as in an English case, Winterbottom v. Wright, which is the precursor rule for product liability. The portion of the MacPherson opinion in which Cardozo demolished the privity bar to recovery is as follows:

If the nature of a thing is such that it is reasonably certain to place life and limb in peril when negligently made, it is then a thing of danger. Its nature gives warning of the consequence to be expected. If to the element of danger there is added knowledge that the thing will be used by persons other than the purchaser, and used without new tests, then, irrespective of contract, the manufacturer of this thing of danger is under a duty to make it carefully. That is as far as we need to go for the decision of this case.... If he is negligent, where danger is to be foreseen, a liability will follow.

== Dissent ==
Willard Bartlett wrote a dissenting opinion objecting to Cardozo's new rule and conclusion.

It has heretofore been held in this state that the liability of the vendor of a manufactured article for negligence arising out of the existence of defects therein does not extend to strangers injured in consequence of such defects but is confined to the immediate vendee. The exceptions to this general rule which have thus far been recognized in New York are cases in which the article sold was of such a character that danger to life or limb was involved in the ordinary use thereof; in other words, where the article sold was inherently dangerous. As has already been pointed out, the learned trial judge instructed the jury that an automobile is not an inherently dangerous vehicle.

== See also ==
- Donoghue v Stevenson [1932] AC 562, where Lord Atkin cited the decision with approval in the House of Lords.
