= Lawrence H. Cooke =

American lawyer and politician (1914–2000)

Lawrence Henry Cooke (October 15, 1914, Monticello, Sullivan County, New York – August 17, 2000, Monticello, Sullivan Co., NY) was an American lawyer and politician from New York. He was Chief Judge of the New York Court of Appeals from 1979 to 1984.

== Life ==
He was the son of George L. Cooke and Mary E. (Pond) Cooke. He graduated from Monticello High School (New York), from Georgetown University in 1935, and from the Albany Law School in 1938. After opening a law office in Monticello in 1939, he was elected Supervisor of the Town of Thompson for two terms. He married Alice McCormack, and they had three children.

His judicial career began in 1953 when he was elected county judge, surrogate and Children's Court judge of Sullivan County. In November 1961, he was elected unopposed a justice of the New York Supreme Court, and was appointed to the Appellate Division in 1968.

In 1972, he ran for the Court of Appeals on the Democratic and Conservative tickets but was defeated. In 1974, he and Jacob D. Fuchsberg were the last two judges elected to the New York Court of Appeals. In 1977, a constitutional amendment made the judgeships appointive. He was the first Chief Judge appointed by the Governor. He was nominated by Governor Hugh L. Carey on January 2, 1979, and confirmed by the New York State Senate on January 23, 1979. He retired from the bench at the end of 1984 when he reached the constitutional age limit of 70 years.

He died at his home in Monticello, and was buried at the Rock Ridge Cemetery there.

== His opinions ==
- In In re Rothko, he wrote the court's opinion finding that the executors of the estate of abstract expressionist painter Mark Rothko violated their fiduciary duties to the beneficiaries of Rothko's estate.
- In People v. Rogers, he wrote in the majority opinion that once a lawyer has entered a proceeding in what may develop into a criminal case, the police must cease questioning the suspect, and that a waiver of the right to counsel may be made only in the presence of counsel.
- In Beach v. Shanley, he wrote the court's opinion that the shield law permits a reporter who has been called before a grand jury to withhold the name of confidential sources without being subject to any sanction for criminal contempt.
- In Sharrock v. Dell Buick-Cadillac, he wrote the majority opinion that a state lien law permitting garage operators to satisfy an overdue bill by auctioning off the delinquent customer's car constituted a state deprivation of property without due process of law under the State Constitution.

== Legacy ==
A number of events and places have been named in his honor, including the Annual Chief Judge Lawrence H. Cooke State Constitutional Commentary Symposium and the Lawrence H. Cooke Sullivan County Courthouse. His name is also attached to several awards given to law students and lawyers.

== Sources ==
- Political Graveyard
- Listing of Court of Appeals judges, with portrait
- Honan, William H. (August 19, 2000). "Lawrence H. Cooke, 85, New York Chief Judge, Dies". The New York Times.

Tribute to Chief Judge Lawrence H. Cooke, 1914–2000, by Vincent Martin Bonventre, Albany Law Review, vol. 64, page 1, (2000)

Legal offices
Preceded by Charles D. Breitel	Chief Judge of the New York Court of Appeals; 1979–1984	Succeeded by Sol Wachtler
