= Bernard S. Meyer =

American lawyer and politician (1916–2005)

Associate Judge of the New York Court of Appeals
- In office 1979 – December 31, 1986
- Preceded by: Lawrence H. Cooke
- Succeeded by: Joseph W. Bellacosa

Personal details
- Born: June 7, 1916 Baltimore, Maryland, U.S.
- Died: September 7, 2006 (aged 90) Valley Stream, New York
- Party: Democratic
- Education: Johns Hopkins University (AB); University of Maryland, Baltimore (JD)

Bernard Stern Meyer (June 7, 1916 Baltimore, Maryland – September 3, 2005 Valley Stream, Nassau County, New York) was an American lawyer and politician.

== Life ==
He graduated from Johns Hopkins University in 1936, and from University of Maryland School of Law in 1938. Soon after, he was admitted to the bar in Maryland. he married and they had children.

In 1941, he joined the staff of the General Counsel of the U.S. Treasury. From 1943 to 1946, he served in the United States Navy in the Pacific Theater of Operations. After the war, he was admitted to the bar in New York, and commenced practice in 1947.

In 1958, he was elected to a fourteen-year term on the New York Supreme Court. In 1972, he ran on the Democratic and Liberal tickets for the New York Court of Appeals but was defeated. After his loss, New York Governor Nelson Rockefeller released an unusual statement lamenting Meyer's departure from the judiciary, as Meyer's term on the Supreme Court expired at the end of 1972.

In 1975, he was appointed Special Deputy Attorney General to probe into the aftermath of the Attica Prison riot in 1971. His principal task was to evaluate a charge that crimes alleged to have been committed by law enforcement officers during the siege were later covered up by the State. In December 1975, after an eight-month inquiry, Meyer released the first volume of his findings, a 570-page document that came to be known as the Meyer Report. The report concluded that, despite "serious errors in judgment," there had been "no intentional cover-up" by the prosecution.

In 1979, he was appointed by Governor Hugh L. Carey to the Court of Appeals, to the seat vacated by the appointment of Lawrence H. Cooke as Chief Judge. Meyer described himself as “middle-of-the-road on the liberal side,” and his appointment gave liberals a majority on the seven-member court. Meyer retired from the Court of Appeals at the end of 1986 when he reached the constitutional age limit of 70 years. Afterwards he resumed the practice of law as a senior partner in the firm of Meyer, Suozzi, English & Klein in Garden City, New York.

He co-authored, with Burton C. Agata and Seth H. Agata, The History of the New York Court of Appeals, 1932-2003, published in 2006 (with his own short bio on page 31), which continues the work The History of the New York Court of Appeals 1847-1932 which was published by Judge Francis Bergan in 1985.

== Sources ==
- Court of Appeals judges
- Fox, Margalit (September 8, 2005). "Bernard S. Meyer, 89; Served on New York's Top Court". The New York Times.
- Bernard S. Meyer Biography
