= Stanley H. Fuld =

American judge (1903–2003)

Stanley Howells Fuld

Chief Judge of the New York Court of Appeals
- In office 1967–1973
- Appointed by: Nelson Rockefeller
- Preceded by: Charles S. Desmond
- Succeeded by: Charles D. Breitel

Associate Judge of the New York Court of Appeals
- In office 1946–1967
- Appointed by: Thomas E. Dewey
- Preceded by: George Z. Medalie
- Succeeded by: Charles D. Breitel

Personal details
- Born: August 23, 1903 New York City, New York
- Died: July 22, 2003 (aged 99) West Palm Beach, Florida
- Education: City College of New York; Columbia Law School (LLB)

Stanley Howells Fuld (August 23, 1903 – July 22, 2003) was an American lawyer and politician from New York. He was Chief Judge of the New York Court of Appeals from 1967 to 1973.

== Life ==
Born in Manhattan, New York City, Fuld was the son of Emanuel I. Fuld (a proofreader of the New York Times) and Hermine (Frisch) Fuld. He graduated from City College of New York in 1923, and received an LL.B. from Columbia University in 1926.

Fuld engaged in private practice until 1935, when he was hired as an investigator by Thomas E. Dewey, Special Prosecutor of Rackets in Manhattan and a schoolmate of Fuld's at Columbia. Fuld's specialty was developing new theories to prosecute racketeers, including Charles "Lucky" Luciano and James J. Hines, the Tammany Hall district leader.

In November 1937, Dewey was elected District Attorney of New York County, and appointed Fuld Head of the Indictment Bureau. From 1939 to 1943, he was Chief of the Appeals Bureau. Afterwards he resumed his private practice

On April 25, 1946, Fuld was appointed by Dewey, now Governor, a judge of the New York Court of Appeals to fill the vacancy caused by the death of George Z. Medalie. In November 1946, he was elected on the Republican ticket to a 14-year term, and re-elected on the Republican and Democratic tickets in 1960. In 1966, he was elected unopposed Chief Judge of the Court of Appeals. In that capacity, after the Attica Prison riot was brutally suppressed in 1971, Governor Nelson Rockefeller invited him and four other state judges to appoint a citizens' committee to investigate the entire affair. He retired from the bench at the end of 1973 when he reached the constitutional age limit of 70 years, and returned to private practice.

Judge Fuld authored the majority opinions in Auten v. Auten and Babcock v. Jackson, which are widely considered to be landmark cases in American choice of law revolution.

== Personal life ==
On May 29, 1930, Fuld married Florence Geringer (d. 1975). After her death, he married Stella Rapaport. He died at his home in West Palm Beach, Florida.

== Sources ==
- Political Graveyard
- Listing of Court of Appeals judges, with portrait

Legal offices
Preceded by Charles S. Desmond	Chief Judge of the New York Court of Appeals; 1967–1973	Succeeded by Charles D. Breitel
