= New York Court of Appeals =

Highest court in the U.S. state of New York

Coordinates: 42.652319°N 73.753946°W

- Seal of the New York Court of Appeals
- Established: 1847
- Jurisdiction: State of New York
- Location: Court of Appeals Hall; Albany, New York, United States
- Authorised by: New York State Constitution
- Appeals to: Supreme Court of the United States (questions of federal or constitutional law only)
- Appeals from: New York Supreme Court, Appellate Division
- Judge term length: 14 years
- Number of positions: 7
- Website: www.nycourts.gov/ctapps

Chief Judge
- Currently: Rowan Wilson
- Since: April 18, 2023

The New York Court of Appeals is the highest court in the Unified Court System of the State of New York. It consists of seven judges: the chief judge and six associate judges, who are appointed by the governor and confirmed by the state senate to 14-year terms. The chief judge of the Court of Appeals also heads administration of the state's court system, and thus is also known as the chief judge of the State of New York. The Court of Appeals was founded in 1847 and is located in the New York Court of Appeals Building in Albany, New York.

== Nomenclature ==
New York uses an unusual nomenclature for its state courts. In the federal court system and in all other U.S. states, the court of last resort is known as the "Supreme Court". New York, however, calls its lower courts the "Supreme Court". In New York, the "Supreme Court" consists of the trial court and the intermediate appellate court, which is called the "Appellate Division" of the Supreme Court. The highest New York state court is called the Court of Appeals.

Further adding to the confusion is New York's terminology for jurists on its top two courts. Those who sit on its Supreme Court are referred to as "Justices" – the title reserved in most states and the Federal court system for members of the highest court – whereas the members of New York's highest court, the Court of Appeals, are simply called "Judges".

== Jurisdiction ==
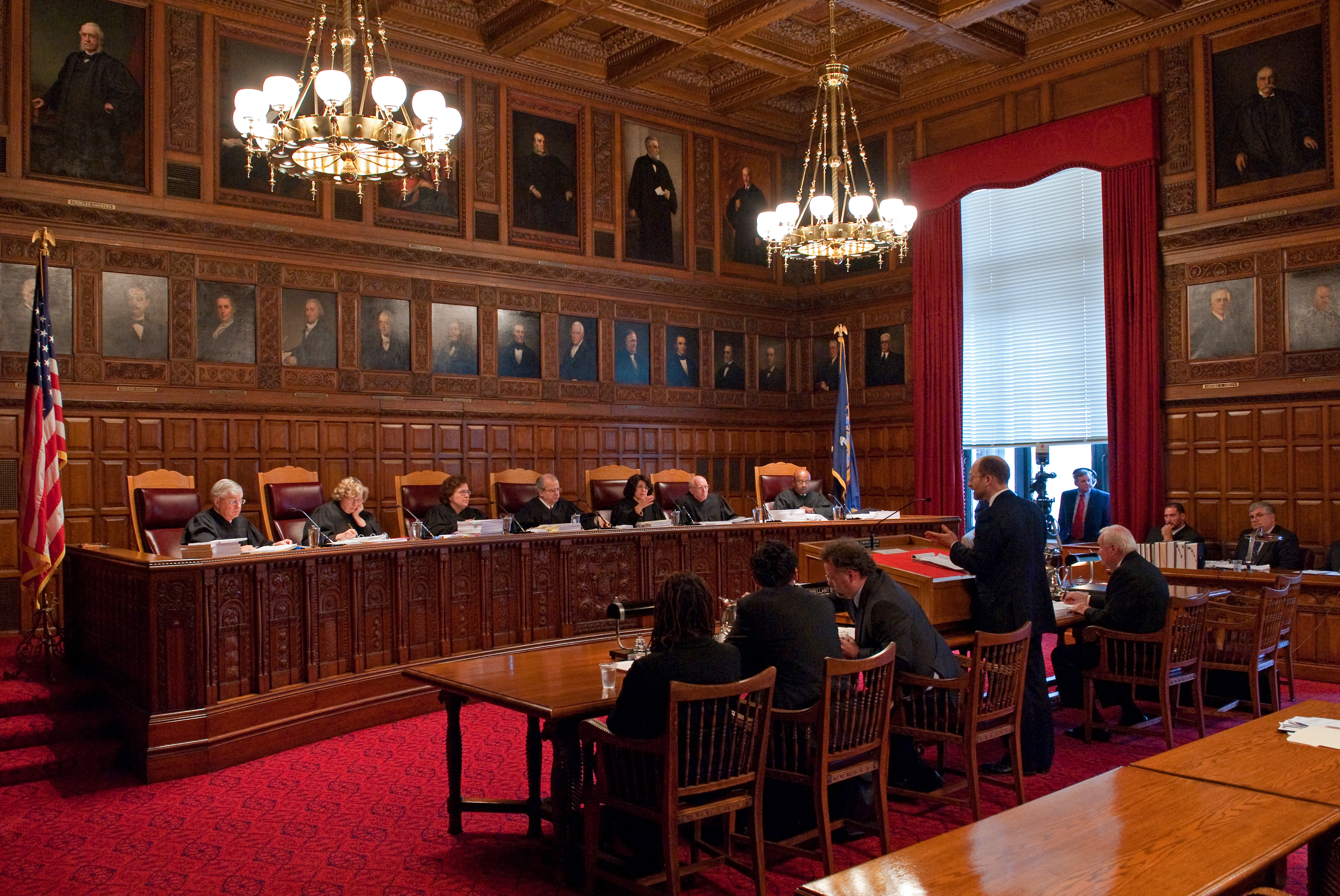
The Court sits in Albany. Here it hears oral arguments in a 2009 case over the Atlantic Yards development in Brooklyn.

Appeals are taken from the four departments of the New York Supreme Court, Appellate Division to the Court of Appeals. In some cases, an appeal lies of right, but in most cases, permission (or "leave") to appeal must be obtained, either from the Appellate Division itself or from the Court of Appeals. In civil cases, the Appellate Division panel or Court of Appeals votes on petitions for leave to appeal; in most criminal cases, however, the petition for leave to appeal is referred to a single Justice or Judge, whose decision whether to grant or deny leave is final. In some criminal cases, some appellate decisions by an Appellate Term or County Court are also appealable to the Court of Appeals, either of right or by permission.

In a few cases, an appeal can be taken from the court of first instance to the Court of Appeals, bypassing the Appellate Division. Direct appeals are authorized from final trial-court decisions in civil cases where the only issue is the constitutionality of a federal or state statute. In criminal cases, a direct appeal to the Court of Appeals is mandatory where a death sentence is imposed, but this provision has been irrelevant since New York's death-penalty law was declared unconstitutional. Decisions by the court can be appealed to the Supreme Court of the United States but only in cases containing a point of federal or constitutional law.

Decisions from the Court of Appeals are binding authority on all lower courts, and persuasive authority for itself in later cases. Every opinion, memorandum, and motion of the Court of Appeals sent to the New York State Reporter is required to be published in the New York Reports.

== Administration of the courts ==
The New York State Unified Court System is a unified state court system that functions under the Chief Judge of the New York Court of Appeals who is the ex officio Chief Judge of New York. The Chief Judge supervises the seven-judge Court of Appeals and is chair of the Administrative Board of the Courts. In addition, the Chief Judge establishes standards and administrative policies after consultation with the Administrative Board and approval by the Court of Appeals. The Chief Administrator (or Chief Administrative Judge if a judge) is appointed by the Chief Judge with the advice and consent of the Administrative Board and oversees the administration and operation of the court system, assisted by the Office of Court Administration. The eleven-member New York State Commission on Judicial Conduct receives complaints, investigates, and makes initial determinations regarding judicial conduct and may recommend admonition, censure, or removal from office to the Chief Judge and Court of Appeals. The Court of Appeals promulgates rules for admission to practice law in New York. (The New York Supreme Court, Appellate Division is responsible for actual admissions.) The New York State Reporter is the official reporter of decisions and is appointed by the Court of Appeals.

== Judges ==
Name	Born	Start	Term ends	Mandatory retirement (Note: All judges must retire on December 31 of the year that they turn 70.)	Appointer	Law school
Rowan D. Wilson, Chief Judge	September 3, 1960 (age 66)	February 6, 2017 (Note: Took office as Chief Judge on April 18, 2023.)	December 31, 2030 (Note: Judge reaches the mandatory retirement deadline before the end of their term.)		Kathy Hochul (D) (Note: Originally appointed by Governor Andrew Cuomo (D) as Associate Judge. Subsequently appointed by Governor Kathy Hochul (D) as Chief Judge.)	Harvard
Jenny Rivera	December 8, 1960 (age 65)	February 11, 2013	February 10, 2027	December 31, 2030	Andrew Cuomo (D)	NYU
Michael J. Garcia	October 8, 1961 (age 65)	February 8, 2016	February 7, 2030	December 31, 2031	Andrew Cuomo (D)	Albany
Madeline Singas	June 6, 1966 (age 60)	June 8, 2021	June 7, 2035	December 31, 2036	Andrew Cuomo (D)	Fordham
Anthony Cannataro	July 3, 1965 (age 61)	June 8, 2021	June 7, 2035	December 31, 2035	Andrew Cuomo (D)	NYLS
Shirley Troutman	September 15, 1959 (age 67)	January 12, 2022	December 31, 2029		Kathy Hochul (D)	Albany
Caitlin Halligan	December 14, 1966 (age 59)	April 19, 2023	December 31, 2036		Kathy Hochul (D)	Georgetown

== History ==
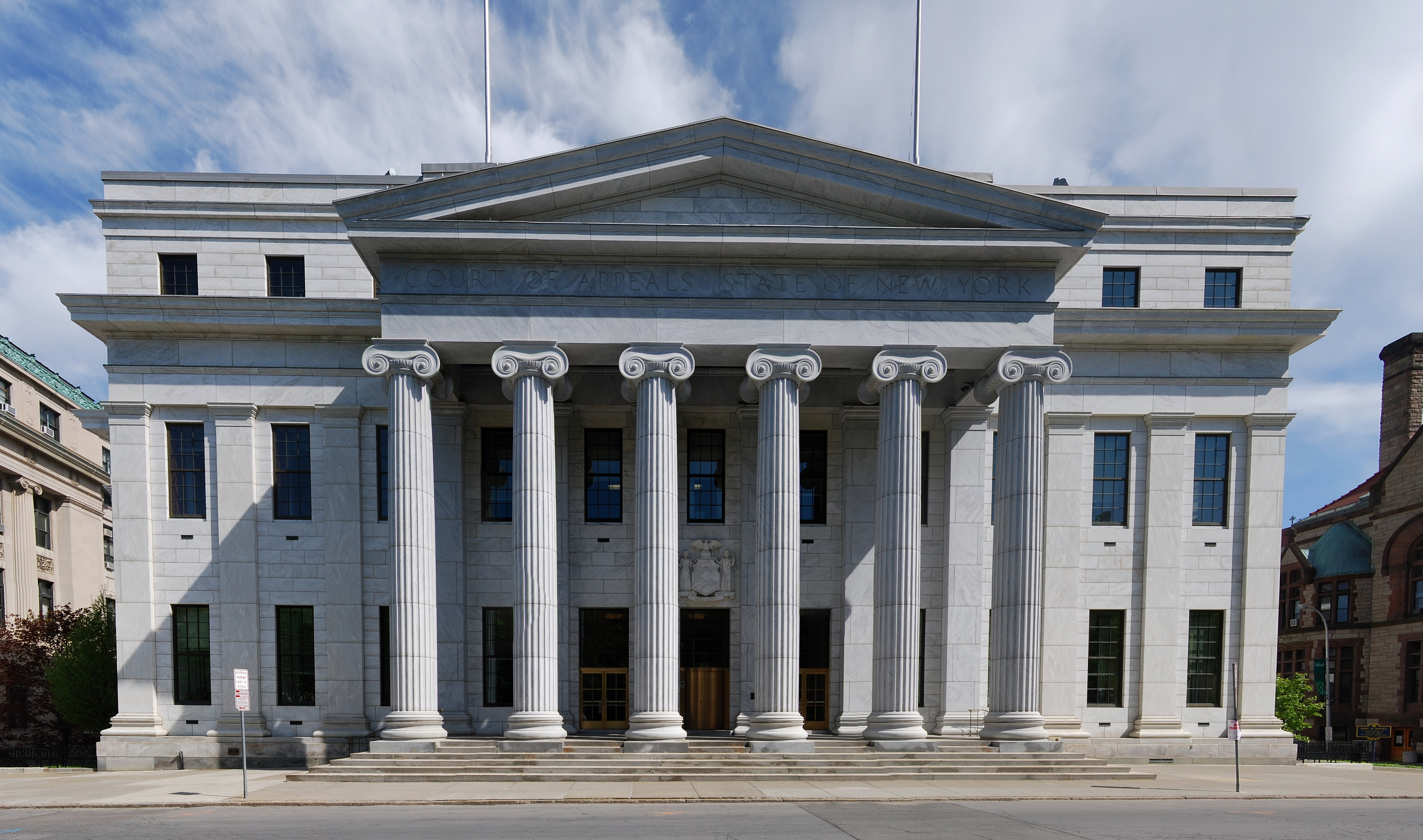
The 1842 courthouse of the New York Court of Appeals in Albany, Henry Rector, architect

The Court of Appeals was created by the New York State Constitution of 1846 to replace both the Court for the Correction of Errors and the Court of Chancery, and had eight members. Four judges were elected by general ballot at the State elections, the other four were chosen annually from among the Supreme Court justices. The first four judges elected at the special judicial state election in June 1847 were Freeborn G. Jewett (to a term of two and a half years), Greene C. Bronson (to a term of four and a half years), Charles H. Ruggles (to a term of six and a half years), and Addison Gardiner (to a term of eight and a half years). They took office on July 5, 1847. Afterwards, every two years, one judge was elected in odd-numbered years to an eight-year term. In case of a vacancy, a judge was temporarily appointed by the Governor, and at the next odd-year state election a judge was elected for the remainder of the term. The Chief Judge was always that one of the elected judges who had the shortest remaining term. Besides, the Court had a Clerk who was elected to a three-year term.

In 1869, the proposed new State Constitution was rejected by the voters. Only the "Judicial Article", which re-organized the New York Court of Appeals, was adopted by a small majority, with 247,240 for and 240,442 against it. The Court of Appeals was wholly re-organised, taking effect on July 4, 1870. All sitting judges were legislated out of office, and seven new judges were elected by general ballot at a special election on May 17, 1870. Democrat Sanford E. Church defeated Republican Henry R. Selden for Chief Judge. The tickets for associate judges had only four names each and the voters could cast only four ballots, so that four judges were chosen by the majority and two by the minority. Martin Grover was the only sitting judge who was re-elected. The judges were elected to a 14-year term, which most judges did not complete, since the Constitution mandated the retirement of the judges at the end of the calendar year in which they reached the age of 70. In case of a vacancy due to death or resignation, a judge was appointed by the Governor until a successor was chosen at the next State election. To replace retiring or appointed judges, all substitutes were elected to full 14-year terms.

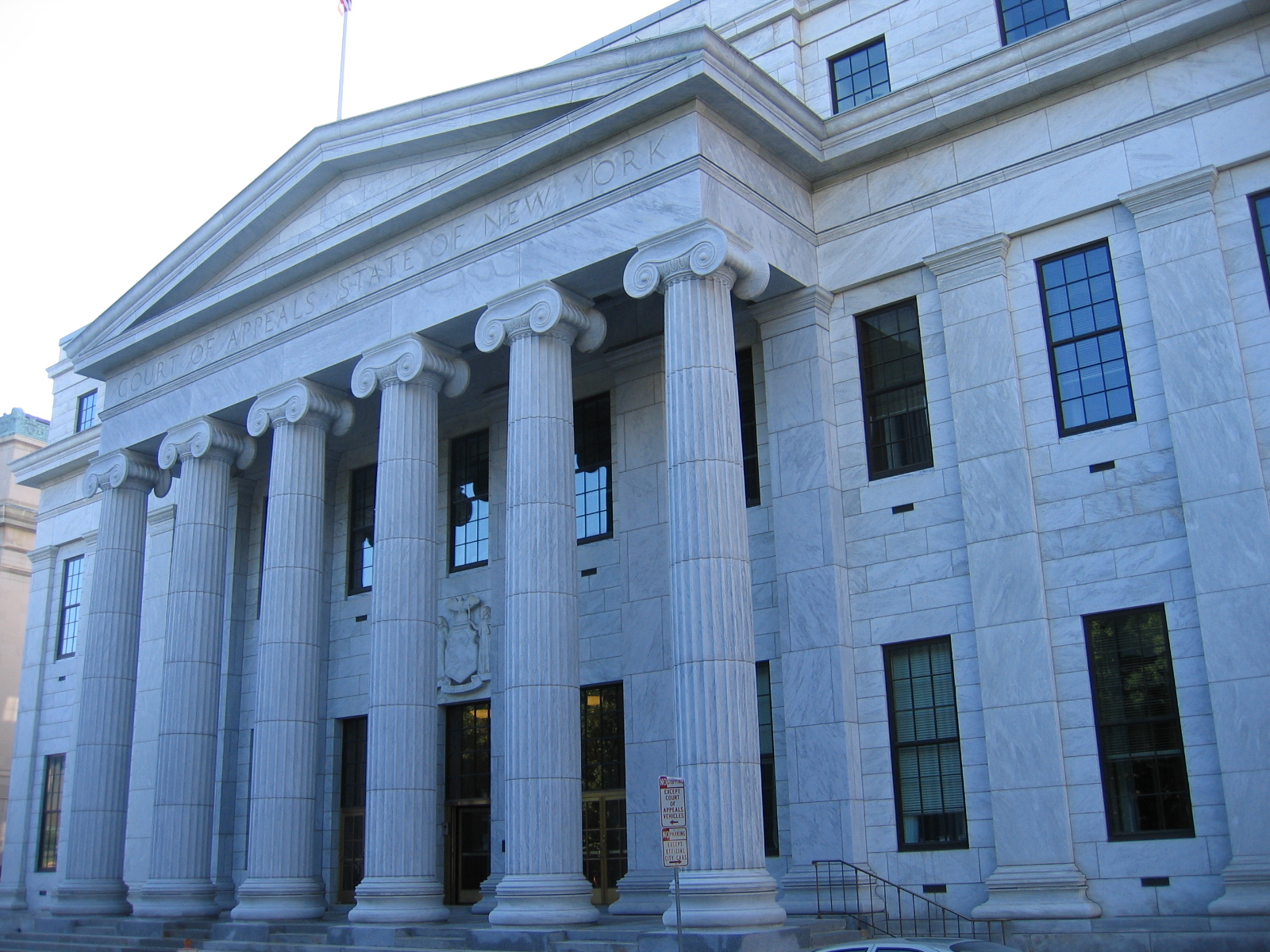
A view of the courthouse's neoclassical portico

In 1889, a "Second Division" of the Court of Appeals was established temporarily to help to decide the large number of cases. Its seven members were designated by Governor David B. Hill, chosen from the New York Supreme Court's General Term benches. Chief Judge was Daniel L. Follett. Among its members were Alton B. Parker and Joseph Potter. The Second Division was continued through 1890. In 1891, the State Constitutional Commission, headed by William B. Hornblower drafted an amendment to abolish the Second Division.

A constitutional amendment adopted in November 1899 permitted the Governor, at the request of a majority of the judges of the Court of Appeals, to designate up to four justices of the Supreme Court to serve as associate judges of the Court of Appeals until the Court's calendar was reduced below two hundred cases. This goal was reached only in 1921, and henceforth no more Supreme Court justices were designated under the amendment of 1899 to serve on the Court of Appeals.

Jacob D. Fuchsberg and Lawrence H. Cooke were the last judges elected by general ballot at the State election in November 1974. Afterwards the judges have been nominated by the Governor and confirmed by the New York State Senate.

== Notable cases ==
The Court of Appeals has decided some of the most important cases in American jurisprudence.

=== Conflict of laws ===
- Babcock v. Jackson (Fuld, J.): holding that the law of the jurisdiction governs that has the strongest interest in the resolution of the particular issue presented.

=== Statutory interpretation ===
- Riggs v. Palmer (Earl, J): used the "social purpose" rule of statutory construction, the process of interpreting a will.

=== Contracts ===
- Wood v. Lucy, Lady Duff-Gordon (Cardozo, J.): was both a minor cause célèbre at the time and an influential development in the law of contract consideration.
- Jacob & Youngs v. Kent (Cardozo, J.): held that expectation damages arising from a breach of contract are limited to the diminution of the property's value if the undoing of the breach was an economic waste.
- Boomer v. Atlantic Cement Co. (Bergan, J.): the court granted an injunction against the cement plant for nuisance, but permitted the plant to pay permanent damages after which the court would vacate the injunction. In essence, the court permitted the plant to pay the net present value of its effects and to continue polluting.

=== Corporations ===
- Berkey v. Third Avenue Railway Co (Cardozo, J.): held that the Third Avenue Railway Co was not liable for the debts of the subsidiary. It was necessary that the domination of the parent company over the subsidiary was required to be complete, in order for the parent company to be treated as liable for the debts of the subsidiary. It was needed that the subsidiary be merely the alter ego of the parent, or that the subsidiary be thinly capitalized, so as to perpetrate a fraud on the creditors.
- Meinhard v. Salmon (Cardozo, J.): held that managing partner in a joint venture had a fiduciary duty to inform the investing partner of an opportunity that would arise after the scheduled termination of the partnership.
- Walkovszky v. Carlton (Fuld, J.): refused to pierce the veil on account of undercapitalization alone.

=== Criminal law ===
- People v. Molineux (Werner, J.): held that using 'evidence' of an unproven previous act of murder against the defendant in a subsequent unrelated trial violated the basic tenet of presumption of innocence, and, therefore, such evidence was inadmissible
- People v. Onofre (Jones): held that it is not the function of the penal law to provide for the enforcement of moral or theological values.
- People v. Antommarchi (Simons, J.): affirming the statutory rights of a defendant to be present during any sidebar questioning of a prospective juror concerning his or her impartiality.
- People v. Goetz (Wachtler, CJ): held that 1) The defense of justification, which permits the use of deadly physical force, is not a purely subjective standard; the actor must not only have the subjective belief that deadly physical force is necessary, but those beliefs must also be objectively reasonable. 2) The mere appearance of perjured testimony given before the Grand Jury is not sufficient to sustain a dismissal of an indictment.
- People v. Scott (Hancock, J.), held that the protections against unlawful search and seizure in the state constitution are broad enough that, contrary to the open-fields doctrine affirmed by the U.S. Supreme Court in Oliver v. United States, a landowner can assert a reasonable expectation of privacy against a warrantless search of all property, not just that within the curtilage of the house, as long as they have made some effort to exclude the public such as posting or fencing the property or gating roads. New York is one of five states where courts have declined to adopt the doctrine.
- People v. LaValle (G.B Smith, J.): The current statute of capital punishment in the state of New York was unconstitutional as it violated article one, section six of the state constitution.

=== Torts ===
- Devlin v. Smith: The Court held that a duty to third parties "exists when a defect is such as to render the article in itself imminently dangerous, and serious injury to any person using it is a natural and probable consequence of its use." The Court further held that scaffolding to be used in the painting of a courthouse was an inherently dangerous article.
- Schloendorff v. Society of New York Hospital (Cardozo, J.): established principles of informed consent and respondeat superior in United States law
- MacPherson v. Buick Motor Co. (Cardozo, J.): helped signal the end of the law's attachment with privity as a source of duty in products liability. This is the foundational doctrine underlying nearly all modern product liability lawsuits.
- Palsgraf v. Long Island Railroad Co. (Cardozo, J.): was important in the development of the concept of the proximate cause in tort law.
- Martin v. Herzog (Cardozo, J.): holding that the unexcused violation of a statutory duty is negligence per se and a jury does not have the power to relax the duty that one traveler on the highway owes under a statute to another on the same highway.
- Chysky v. Drake Bros. Co. (McLaughlin, J.): The Court held that a plaintiff cannot recover from a defendant based on implied warranty when she does not have contractual privity with him; thus, a plaintiff cannot recover from a defendant who sold her employer food unfit for consumption, because the defendant's implied warranty extended only to the employer.
- Tedla v. Ellman (Lehman, J.): the court held that because the violation occurred in a situation not anticipated by the drafters of the statute and was in keeping with the spirit of the statute, it did not constitute negligence.
- Akins v. Glens Falls City School District (Jasen, J.): The Court held that the Baseball Rule, an exception to tort law under which spectators at sporting events cannot hold teams, players or venues liable if they are injured by a ball leaving the field as long as some protected seating was available, is still valid under comparative negligence, the first time it was challenged under that doctrine.

== See also ==
- Judiciary of New York
- Judicial Conference of the State of New York
- Clerk of the New York Court of Appeals
