= 1970 New York gubernatorial election =

- November 3, 1970
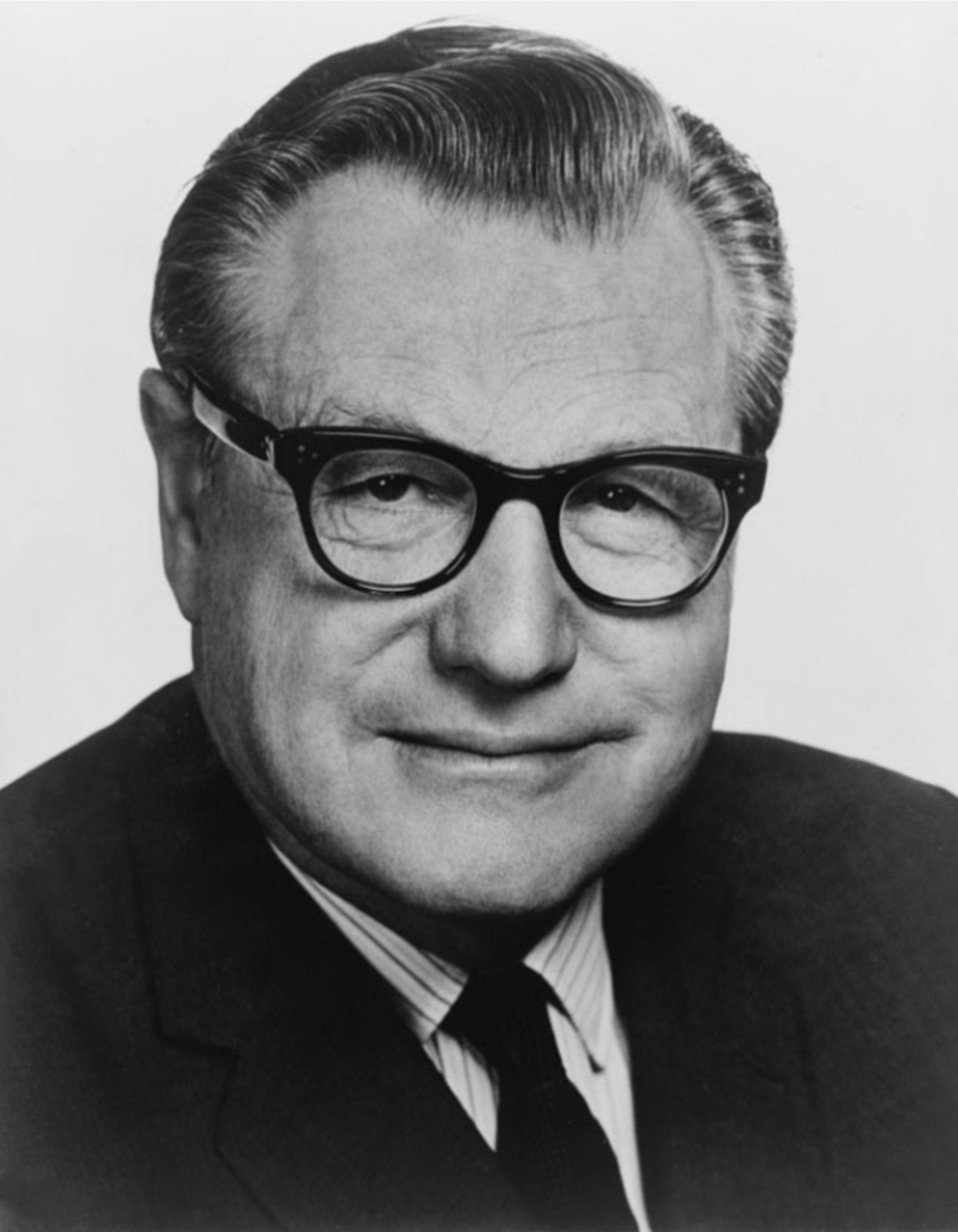

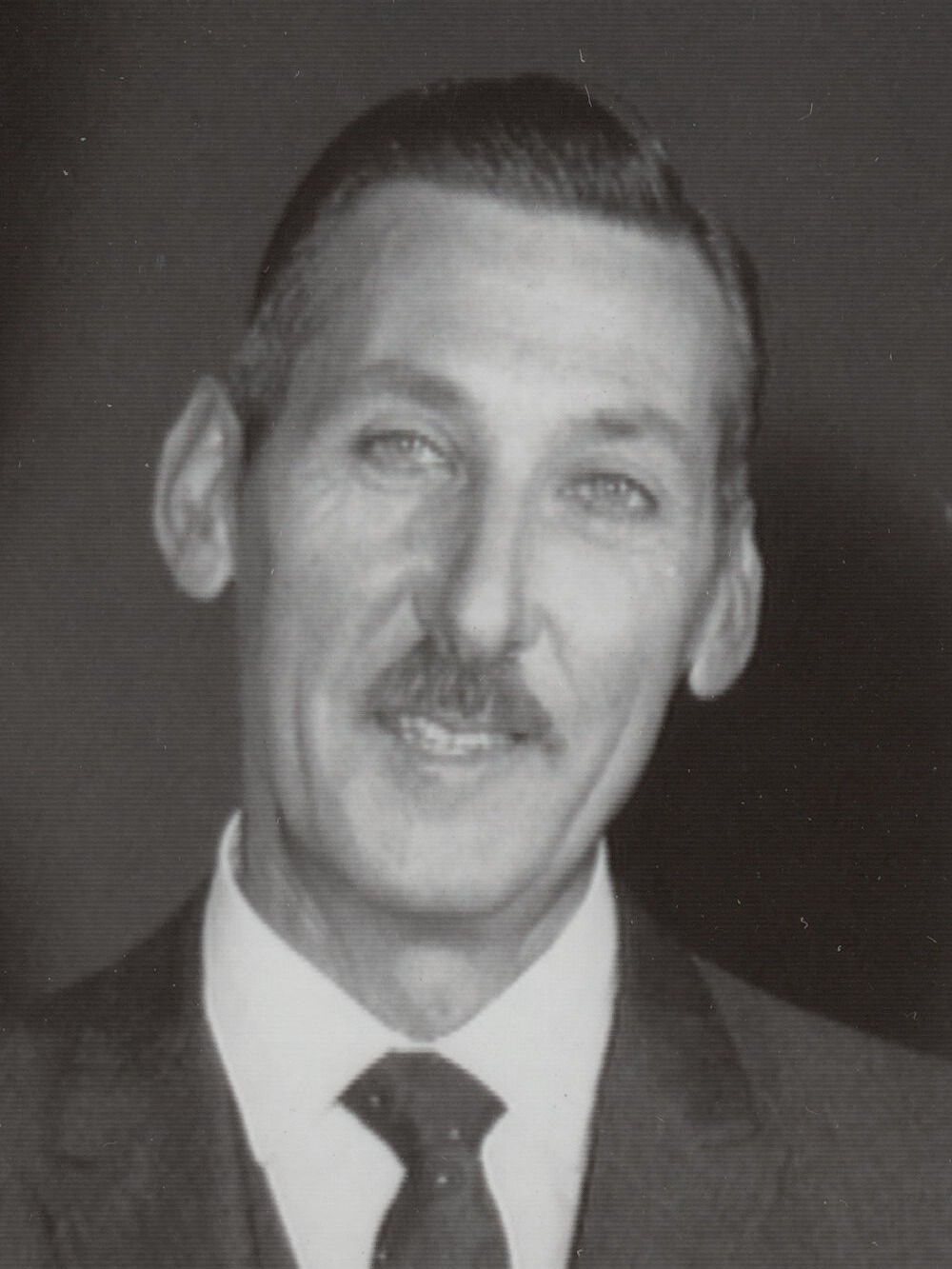
Nominee	Nelson Rockefeller	Arthur Goldberg	Paul L. Adams
Party	Republican	Democratic	Conservative
Alliance	Civil Service Independent	Liberal
Running mate	Malcolm Wilson	Basil Paterson	Edward F. Leonard
Popular vote	3,151,432	2,421,426	422,514
Percentage	52.41%	40.27%	7.03%
- County results Rockefeller: 40–50% 50–60% 60–70% Goldberg: 40–50% 50–60%
Governor before election
Nelson Rockefeller
Republican
Elected Governor
Nelson Rockefeller
Republican

The 1970 New York gubernatorial election was held on November 3, 1970 to elect the governor and lieutenant governor of New York. Republican incumbent Nelson Rockefeller was elected to a fourth term in office over Arthur Goldberg.

Primary elections were held on June 23. Goldberg narrowly defeated Howard J. Samuels for the Democratic nomination. Goldberg's running mate, Basil Paterson, was the first African-American nominee for lieutenant governor. (Note: His son, David Paterson, would become the first African-American lieutenant governor of New York in 2007. Paterson would serve as governor from 2008 to 2010, after the resignation of Eliot Spitzer.)

Rockefeller received over 3.15 million votes, the highest total in any New York gubernatorial election until Andrew Cuomo received 3.64 million in 2018. After this election, no Republican was elected governor until George Pataki in 1994. This is the last time that Republicans carried Queens County in a gubernatorial election.

== Background ==
Nelson Rockefeller was first elected governor of New York in 1958; he was broadly considered moderate or liberal, known for his support for civil rights and abortion rights, and a leader of one wing of the national Republican Party. In 1960, 1964 and 1968, he ran for president of the United States but failed to win the Republican nomination in each race. In 1966, he was re-elected as governor with only a plurality of the vote, as conservatives supported Conservative Party nominee Paul L. Adams and liberals supported Liberal Party candidate Franklin D. Roosevelt Jr.

Entering 1970, however, Rockefeller was generally seen to have modified his views to better align with the changing direction of his party and divisions within the New York State Democratic Party. He emphasized his support for law and order policies and extolled belief in the virtues of the silent majority. In the 1969 New York City mayoral election, he chose to support the Republican nominee, state senator John J. Marchi, over Republican incumbent John Lindsay, who ran on the Liberal Party ticket. Although Rockefeller had been a major donor to and public supporter of Lindsay in his 1965 campaign, he claimed that his role as titular head of the New York Republican Party required him to support Marchi as the party's nominee. Anticipating a race against a liberal candidate in the upcoming gubernatorial election, Rockefeller privately strategized in April 1970 that he would win re-election by seeking the support of the so-called "white ethnic" vote, including lower-middle-income Roman Catholics of Italian or Polish ancestry. Rockefeller also told friends that he could not hope to hold the 35 percent of the Jewish and African American votes he had received in prior elections. Both supporters and opponents viewed this as a move towards the political right.

Rockefeller was also able to disincentivize potential opponents through his imposing personal fortune; he had spent $10 million on his 1966 campaign, and when asked how much he was prepared to spend in 1970, Rockefeller responded, "Enough."

== Democratic primary ==
=== Governor ===
==== Candidates ====
- Arthur Goldberg, former U.S. ambassador to the United Nations, U.S. secretary of labor, and associate justice of the U.S. Supreme Court (also running as Liberal)
- Howard J. Samuels, former administrator of the Small Business Administration (also running as Liberal)

===== Withdrew =====
- Eugene Nickerson, Nassau County executive

U.N. ambassador Arthur Goldberg was lobbied to run for governor. In early December, he met with business, civic, and political leaders at the home of W. Averell Harriman, Rockefeller's predecessor, and a majority of the men urged Goldberg specifically to run for governor. He was considered a highly credentialed challenger, though he had only held appointed offices and had never run for public office himself. On December 9, 1969, he disclaimed any suggestions that he would run for governor or any other office in 1970, saying that his decision was "final and not subject to change." Goldberg's associates speculated that he was reluctant to engage in a long, costly primary fight; both Howard J. Samuels and Eugene Nickerson said they would not "step aside" for Goldberg to seek the governorship. At the time, Goldberg's supporters claimed that polling showed him leading Rockefeller with 58 percent of the vote to 33 percent for the incumbent.

==== Campaign ====
In April, Goldberg won the endorsement of the Democratic state committee, establishing him as the frontrunner for the nomination.

==== Results ====
1970 Democratic gubernatorial primary
Party	Candidate	Votes	%
Democratic	Arthur Goldberg	496,648	52.16%
Democratic	Howard J. Samuels	455,482	47.84%
Total votes		952,130	100.00

=== Lieutenant governor ===
==== Candidates ====
- Jerome Ambro, Huntington supervisor
- Basil A. Paterson, state senator from Harlem

==== Results ====
1970 Democratic lieutenant gubernatorial primary
Party	Candidate	Votes	%
Democratic	Basil A. Paterson	594,751	71.23%
Democratic	Jerome Ambro	240,235	28.77%
Total votes		834,986	100.00

== Other contested nominations ==
=== Conservative ===
Conservative Party convention results
Party	Candidate	Votes	%
Conservative	Paul L. Adams	75	97.40
Conservative	Mario Procaccino (write-in)	2	2.60
Total votes		77	100.00

=== Liberal ===
Liberal Party State Committee vote results
Party	Candidate	Votes	%
Liberal	Arthur Goldberg	211	70.33
Liberal	Robert M. Morgenthau	81	27.00
Liberal	Howard J. Samuels	8	2.67
Total votes		300	100.00

== General election ==
=== Candidates ===
- Paul L. Adams, academic dean of Roberts Wesleyan College and 1966 nominee for governor (Conservative)
  - Running mate: Edward F. Leonard, Iona College political science professor
- Clifton DeBerry, 1964 nominee for president of the United States and 1965 nominee for mayor of New York City (Socialist Workers)
  - Running mate: Jonathan Rothschild, Manhattan taxi driver
- Stephen Emery, retired city subway dispatcher and perennial candidate (Socialist Labor)
  - Running mate: Arnold Babel, systems analyst
- Arthur Goldberg, former U.S. ambassador to the United Nations, U.S. secretary of labor, and associate justice of the U.S. Supreme Court (Democratic, Liberal)
  - Running mate: Basil Paterson, state senator from Harlem
- Nelson Rockefeller, incumbent governor since 1959 (Republican, Civil Service Independent)
  - Running mate: Malcolm Wilson, incumbent lieutenant governor since 1959
- Rasheed Storey, New York Communist Party chairman (Communist)
  - Running mate: Grace Mora-Newman, East Bronx housewife and active anti-war community organizer

The Communist Party nominated a slate for the first time since 1946.

==== Disqualified ====
- Albert Bushong (Courage)
  - Running mate: Robert P. Shields
- Jane Gilroy, Merrick housewife and homemaker (Right to Life)
  - Running mate: Marcia Pilsner, Seaford homemaker

Gilroy was disqualified from the ballot after three thousand of her petition signatures were ruled invalid.

=== Campaign ===
In a marked contrast to the preceding elections, Rockefeller ran a more conservative, populist campaign aimed at appealing to frustrated working-class voters, using the May 8 Hard Hat Riot in lower Manhattan as a symbolic breaking point with the elite liberalism of Lindsay, who had condemned the violence. Rockefeller had a close working relationship with Peter J. Brennan, who was accused of engineering the riots and served as the chief organizer of pro-Nixon, pro-war demonstrations that followed the initial unrest. Instead of joining Lindsay in calling for peace, Rockefeller emphasized the need for leaders to "get going and meet" the problems of modern urban life and offered public sympathy to those voters "frustrated and frightened by crime, muggings and robbings, by the filth of the streets, by the breakdowns whether it's power, transportation [or] telephones." Rockefeller openly courted organized labor, winning the endorsements of at least 17 unions and claiming to have the endorsements of 50 unions representing more than 1.2 million members in total, despite Goldberg's credentials as a labor lawyer and former U.S. labor secretary. However, he lost the endorsements of the International Ladies Garment Workers Union and Local 1199 of the Drug and Hospital Union, which had supported him in his prior two campaigns for re-election and now backed Goldberg.

Rockefeller won early cross-party support for his campaign, and his "white ethnic" campaign had proven successful by September. On a visit to Bay Ridge, a predominantly Italian and Irish neighborhood of Brooklyn which had only given him 38 percent of the vote in 1966, Rockefeller was reportedly mobbed by enthusiastic supporters. Simultaneously, the Buffalo Evening News reported on his inroads in Erie County, where typically Democratic blue-collar workers, many of them Polish Americans, had splintered. On September 11, he was endorsed by Democratic reformer and former New York City police commissioner Francis W. H. Adams, who praised his record and said that Goldberg was not capable of uniting the divisions in the Democratic Party. Days later, Rockefeller personally accepted the endorsement of Mario Procaccino, who had run a conservative populist campaign as the Democratic nominee against Lindsay in the prior year's mayoral race. Procaccino attacked Goldberg as a "limousine liberal" who had supported Lindsay and "stabbed the Democratic Party in the back," and claimed, "A vote for Paul Adams is a wasted vote." The Rockefeller campaign contrasted Goldberg's campaign materials, which depicted him wearing a hard hat, with Rockefeller's own record as "a real worker, a man who knows how to get things done." Goldberg and Paterson said that the Procaccino endorsement showed that Rockefeller was embracing the conservative element in the state and abandoning the center.

Rockefeller was considered the heavy favorite for much of the race, but the race became heated in October, when Rockefeller accused Goldberg of promising a state job paying $70,000 ($580,000 in 2025) in exchange for an endorsement. Goldberg shocked the press with his profane, forthright response, "Rockefeller is full of bullshit. You can quote me. I want you to quote me." Goldberg's campaign got a further boost when Lindsay, the nominally Republican mayor of New York City, endorsed him over Rockefeller. Lindsay's endorsement was widely seen as a precursor to Lindsay's decision to switch to the Democratic Party, where he might have a national political future including a run for president. Lindsay preempted this speculation by pointing out that he remained a registered Republican and had endorsed Republican U.S. senator Charles Goodell and attorney general Louis Lefkowitz, although the large majority of his endorsements for Congress and the state legislature were for Democratic candidates; he argued that Rockefeller had drifted to the political right. Rockefeller called the claim "a complete distortion and misrepresentation of the facts. Lindsay's endorsement of Goldberg came despite a public request from Rockefeller to remain neutral in the race, which the majority of Lindsay's advisers supported.

To exploit the divisions in the Democratic base, Rockefeller sought to reach out to ethnic minorities, attending the Feast of San Gennaro in Little Italy and pledging support to Israel in order to "restore the balance of power in the Middle East" following the Dawson's Field hijackings by Palestinian militants. Rockefeller personally visited New Yorkers whose families were being held hostage at the time. Days before the election, Rockefeller claimed the endorsement of a dozen Orthodox rabbis, eleven of whom appeared at a news conference with the governor; Goldberg claimed the endorsement was false and that at least seven of the rabbis had not consented to the use of their names. The only named rabbi who did not appear at the news conference, Meyer Cohen, confirmed that he had not endorsed any candidate.

Rockefeller was aided by a generally less active campaign from the Conservative Party on his right, which focused instead on supporting James L. Buckley to the concurrent United States Senate election. Adams himself spent most of the campaign gathering signatures or stumping for Buckley.

=== Polling ===
In late October, Rockefeller called the race a "tough fight, a close race," claiming that he had been two points behind Goldberg in late September but was "beyond two points ahead of him." A survey commissioned by The New York Times found that self-identified conservatives favored Rockefeller by 44.7 percent to 19.3 percent for Goldberg, while 29.5 percent of moderates remained undecided. On October 27, he clarified that internal polls showed him ahead by 8 points. However, a New York Daily News straw poll showed Rockefeller ahead by a much larger 21-point margin. In the final Daily News straw poll, taken on November 1, he led by 15 points.

Poll source	Date(s)	Sample size	Nelson Rockefeller (R)	Arthur Goldberg (D)	Paul Adams (C)	Other / undecided (Note: Calculated by taking the difference of 100% and all other candidates combined.)
New York Daily News	November 2, 1970	5,025 (Note: Straw votes)	54%	39%	4%	3%
New York Daily News	November 2, 1970	588 (Note: Live interviews)	52%	36%	5%	7%
New York Daily News	October 26, 1970	[data missing]	57%	36%	4%	3%

=== Endorsements ===
Arthur Goldberg (D, L)

Local officials

- John Lindsay, mayor of New York City (Republican)
- Thomas J. Mackell, Queens district attorney
- Paul O'Dwyer, former member of the New York City Council and founder of the New Democratic Coalition
- Frank G. Rossetti, state assemblyman and chair of the Manhattan Democratic Party

Party officials

- Patrick Cunningham, chair of the Bronx Democratic Party
- Meade Esposito, chair of the Brooklyn Democratic Party

Labor unions

- Local 1199 of the Drug and Hospital Union
- International Ladies Garment Workers Union
Nelson Rockefeller (R, CSI)

Local officials

- Francis W. H. Adams, former New York City police commissioner (Democratic)
- Mario Procaccino, former New York City comptroller and 1969 Democratic nominee for mayor of New York City (Democratic)

Newspapers

- The New York Times

Labor unions

- Building and Construction Trades Council of Greater New York
- New York State Firefighters Association
- Teamsters Joint Council 16
- Uniformed Sanitationmen's Association

newspaper advertisement for the Democratic ticket

=== Results ===
New York gubernatorial election, 1970
Party	Candidate	Votes	%	±%
Republican	Nelson Rockefeller	3,105,220	51.64%	
Civil Service Ind.	Nelson Rockefeller	46,212	0.77%	
Total	Nelson Rockefeller (incumbent)	3,151,432	52.41%	+7.80%
Democratic	Arthur Goldberg	2,158,355	35.90%	
Liberal	Arthur Goldberg	263,071	4.38%	
Total	Arthur Goldberg	2,421,426	40.27%	+2.16%
Conservative	Paul L. Adams	422,514	7.03%	−1.43%
Communist	Rasheed Storey	7,760	0.13%	N/A
Socialist Workers	Clifton DeBerry	5,766	0.10%	−0.11%
Socialist Labor	Stephen Emery	3,963	0.07%	−0.14%
Majority		730,006	12.14%	+5.64%
Turnout		6,012,861		
Republican hold				

== See also ==
- 1970 New York state election
- 2006 New York gubernatorial election
