= Paul L. Adams (academic) =

American academic (1915–1984)

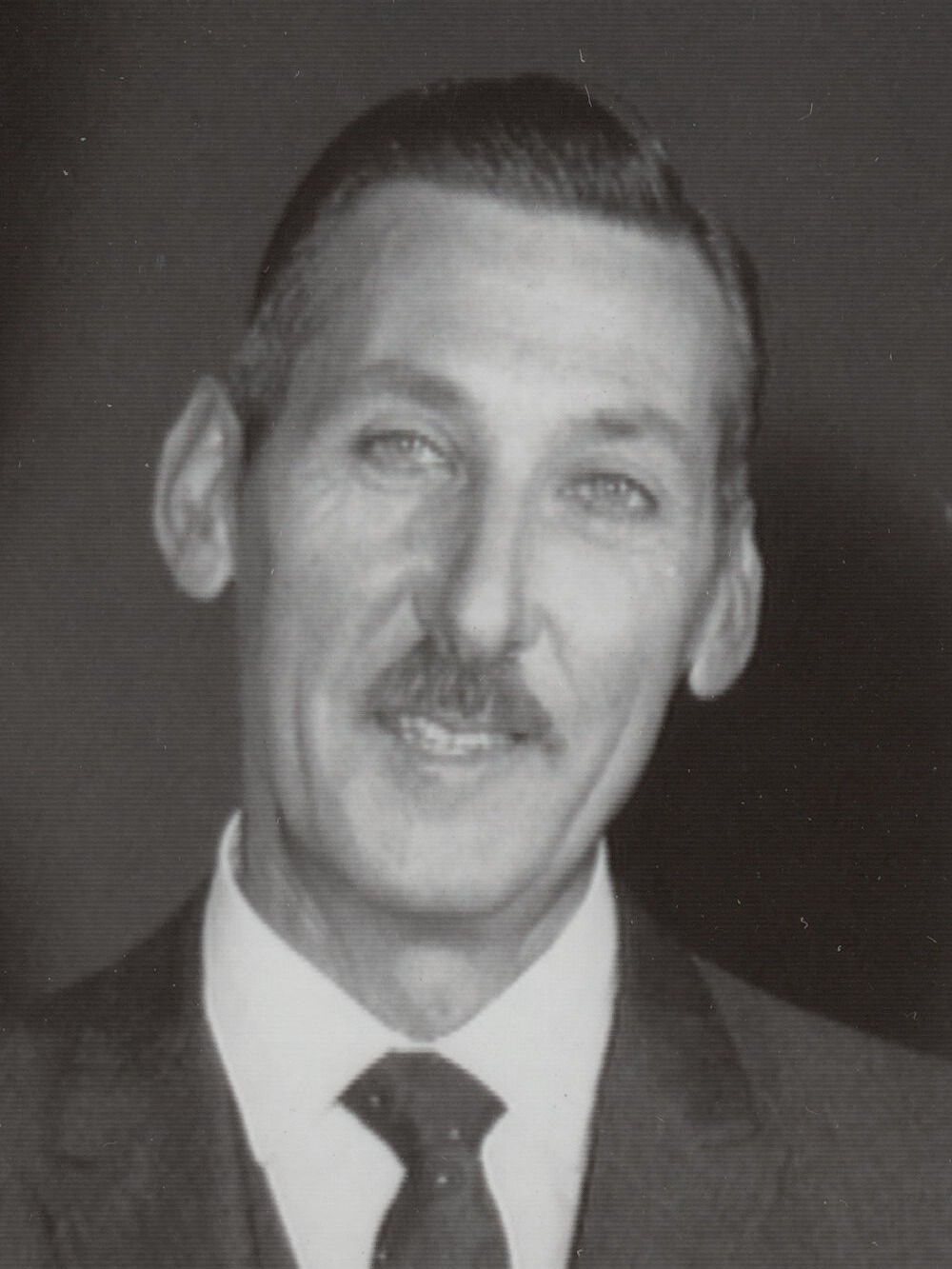
- Adams in 1966

President of Roberts Wesleyan College
- In office 1974–1981

Personal details
- Born: March 25, 1915 Natrona Heights, Pennsylvania, U.S.
- Died: July 28, 1984 (aged 69) Rochester, New York, U.S.
- Party: Conservative Party of New York
- Spouse: Jean Parmenter
- Children: 4
- Education: Greenville College

Paul L. Adams (March 25, 1915 – July 28, 1984) was an American academic who served as president of Roberts Wesleyan College from 1974 to 1981. He also twice ran for Governor of New York as a Conservative Party candidate, recording some of the highest totals by a third-party candidate in state history. Adams died of cancer at the age of 69 on July 28, 1984.

== Personal life and academic career ==
Adams was born in Natrona Heights, Pennsylvania (on the outskirts of Pittsburgh). On the recommendation of Merlin G. Smith, a family friend who was the university's president, he briefly attended Roberts Wesleyan (then known as Chesbrough Seminary) as an undergraduate. However, Roberts Wesleyan only offered two-year degrees at that time, so Adams completed his undergraduate education at Greenville College (in Greenville, Illinois). He served in the United States Army during World War II, and then on his return did graduate work at the University of Rochester and Ohio State University. Adams returned to Roberts Wesleyan in 1950, as a member of the faculty. Initially a history and political science professor, he later became head of the social studies department and academic dean. He left in 1972 to become academic dean of Hillsdale College (in Hillsdale, Michigan), but returned to Roberts Wesleyan in 1974 as president, a position which he held until his retirement in 1981. Adams died of cancer at Genesee Hospital, Rochester, in July 1984, aged 69. A music scholarship was established in his name. He had married Jean Parmerter in 1946, with whom he had three sons and a daughter.

== Politics ==
Previously enrolled as a Republican, in 1966 Adams left that party to run as the gubernatorial candidate of the Conservative Party of New York (which had only been founded in 1962 and contested a single previous statewide election). In a surprise result, Adams won 8.46% of the statewide vote, which was the best result for a third-party candidate since 1944 (when Dean Alfange won 9.79%). Only Herbert London (Conservative Party, 1990, 20.40%) and Tom Golisano (Independence Party, 2002, 14.28%) have won more votes as a third-party candidate since then. In several counties, Adams won over 10% of the vote, including a high of 18.73% in Richmond County. Most importantly, Adams beat the Liberal Party candidate, Franklin Roosevelt Jr., relegating the Liberals to Row D and securing Row C for the Conservatives on the ballot for the next state elections. (Note: With ballot position determined by finishing order in the governor's race, the Democrats and Republicans usually contested for Rows A and B. Whichever party secured Row C would then appear as the most prominent alternative to the major parties, and was likely to obtain more votes than the parties on the lower lines.)

Adams reprised his candidacy in 1970. He was included in debates alongside the Republican and Democratic candidates, Nelson Rockefeller and Arthur Goldberg, respectively. Adams predicted he would win "somewhere in excess of 700,000 votes and possibly a million", but in fact won 422,514 (7.03% of the total). This was despite his Conservative colleague James L. Buckley winning a Senate election at the same time with over 40% of the vote. Adams's father, Loyal L. Adams, died during the campaign. T

=== Elections ===
New York gubernatorial election, 1966
Governor candidate	Running Mate	Party	Popular Vote	
Nelson A. Rockefeller	Malcolm Wilson	Republican	2,690,626	(44.61%)
Frank D. O'Connor	Howard J. Samuels	Democratic	2,298,363	(38.11%)
Paul L. Adams	Kieran O'Doherty	Conservative	513,023	(8.46%)
Franklin D. Roosevelt, Jr.	Donald S. Harrington	Liberal	507,234	(8.41%)
Milton Herder	Doris Ballantyne	Socialist Labor	12,730	(0.21%)
Judith White	Richard Garza	Socialist Workers	12,506	(0.21%)
New York gubernatorial election, 1970
Governor candidate	Running Mate	Party	Popular Vote	
Nelson A. Rockefeller	Malcolm Wilson	Republican	3,151,432	(52.41%)
Arthur Goldberg	Basil Paterson	Democratic, Liberal	2,421,426	(40.27%)
Paul L. Adams	Edward F. Leonard	Conservative	422,514	(7.03%)
Rasheed Storey	Grace Mora-Newman	Communist	7,760	(0.13%)
Clifton DeBerry	Jonathan Rothschild	Socialist Workers	5,766	(0.10%)
Stephen Emery	Arnold Babel	Socialist Labor	3,963	(0.07%)

== Notes ==
Party political offices
Preceded by David H. Jaquith	Conservative nominee for Governor of New York; 1966, 1970	Succeeded by Malcolm Wilson
