= 1974 New York state election =

- November 5, 1974

The 1974 New York state election was held on November 5, 1974, to elect the governor, the lieutenant governor, the state comptroller, the attorney general, two judges of the New York Court of Appeals and a U.S. senator, as well as all members of the New York State Assembly and the New York State Senate.

== Background ==
In 1973, Governor Nelson A. Rockefeller resigned, and was succeeded by Lt. Gov. Malcolm Wilson.

In 1973, Judge Charles D. Breitel was elected Chief Judge of the New York Court of Appeals, and Judge Adrian P. Burke resigned, effective December 31, 1973, thus leaving two vacancies on the Court of Appeals. In January 1974, Republican Samuel Rabin and Democrat Harold A. Stevens, the Presiding Justices of the Appellate Division's First and Second Departments, were appointed by Governor Malcolm Wilson to fill the vacancies temporarily.

== Nominations ==
=== Democratic primary ===
The Democratic State Committee met from June 13 to 15 at Niagara Falls, New York, and designated Howard J. Samuels for governor, but Congressman Hugh L. Carey polled enough votes to force a primary election. They also designated Mario M. Cuomo for lieutenant governor; the incumbent Arthur Levitt for Comptroller; Robert R. Meehan for attorney general; Judge Harold A. Stevens and Appellate Justice Lawrence H. Cooke for the Court of Appeals; and Mayor of Syracuse Lee Alexander for the U.S. Senate. Despite the state committee's stance, Carey and his reformist slate found support in disparate quarters. In August he was strongly endorsed by former New York City mayor Robert F. Wagner who, drawing a pointed comparison to Samuels, called Carey "free of boss ties and obligations". The primary election was held on September 10. Carey and his allies swept to victory: all the state party's designees were defeated, with only the unopposed Comptroller Levitt and one unopposed judge surviving the upset. Basil Paterson, who in 1970 received the most votes in the Democratic primary was not mentioned as a candidate for governor in 1974.

1974 Democratic primary results
Office	Party designees		Challengers			
Governor	Howard J. Samuels	380,326	Hugh L. Carey	582,406		
Lieutenant Governor	Mario M. Cuomo	284,821	Mary Anne Krupsak	390,123	Antonio G. Olivieri	218,583
Comptroller	Arthur Levitt		(unopposed)			
Attorney General	Robert R. Meehan	264,681	Robert Abrams	515,642		
Judge of the Court of Appeals	Lawrence H. Cooke					
Judge of the Court of Appeals	Harold A. Stevens		Jacob D. Fuchsberg			
U.S. Senator	Lee Alexander	255,250	Ramsey Clark	414,327	Abraham Hirschfeld	194,076

=== Other parties with ballot line ===
The Republican State Committee met on June 12 at the Nassau Coliseum, and designated the incumbents Wilson, Lefkowitz, Rabin, Stevens and Javits for re-election; and completed the ticket with Nassau County Executive Ralph G. Caso for lieutenant governor; and Ex-Mayor of Rochester Stephen May for Comptroller. On June 28, Rabin declined to run because he was already 69, just one year short of the constitutional age limit, and on July 22, Appellate Justice Louis M. Greenblott, of Binghamton, was designated instead.

The Conservative State Committee met on June 15, and designated the incumbent Republican governor Wilson for re-election. T. David Bullard polled enough votes to force a primary election, but withdrew on June 29. They also designated Republican Ralph G. Caso for lieutenant governor; Bradley J. Hurd (born c. 1902), "lumber dealer," of Buffalo, for Comptroller; Edward F. Campbell (born c. 1920), of Huntington, for attorney general; the incumbent Democrat Harold A. Stevens, and Manhattan lawyer Henry S. Middendorf, Jr., for the Court of Appeals; and Barbara A. Keating, of Larchmont, for the U.S. Senate.

The Liberal State Committee met on June 15, and designated Ex-Deputy Mayor of New York Edward A. Morrison for governor; and Raymond B. Harding, of The Bronx, for lieutenant governor; with the understanding that both would step aside in favor of the winners of the Democratic primary to be held in September. They also endorsed the incumbents Levitt (Dem.), Lefkowitz (Rep.), Stevens (Dem.) and Javits (Rep.) for re-election. On September 14, Morrison and Harding withdrew, and the State Committee endorsed the Democratic nominees Hugh L. Carey for governor; and Mary Anne Krupsak for lieutenant governor. Morrison and Harding were nominated to run for the New York Supreme Court.

The Republican, Liberal and Conservative tickets designated by the state committees were not challenged in primaries.

=== Minor parties ===
Six minor parties filed petitions to nominate candidates and appeared on the ballot.

The "Courage Party," the New York state branch of the American Party, nominated Dr. Wayne S. Amato (born c. 1941), Ph.D. in chemical engineering, assistant professor at Syracuse University, for governor; Charles R. Schanger, of Redford, for lieutenant governor; and Dr. William F. Dowling, Jr., dentist, of Garden City, for the U.S. Senate.

The Free Libertarian Party nominated Jerry Tuccille, of Tarrytown, for governor; Louis J. Sicilia, of Manhattan, for lieutenant governor; Robert S. Flanzer, of Brooklyn, for Comptroller; Leland W. Schubert, of Manhattan, for attorney general; Melvin J. Hirshowitz and Jack A. Martin, both of Manhattan, for the Court of Appeals; and Percy L. Greaves, Jr., for the U.S. Senate.

The Socialist Workers Party nominated Derrick Morrison (born 1946), of Manhattan, a writer for The Militant, for governor. Morrison was actually ineligible for the office which requires a minimum age of 30. They also nominated James Mendietta, of Brooklyn, for lieutenant governor; Sam Manuel for Comptroller; Raymond Markey (born c. 1940), librarian, for attorney general; and Rebecca Finch (born c. 1944) for the U.S. Senate.

The Communist Party nominated Jose A. Ristorrucci (born c. 1943 in Puerto Rico) for governor; Carol Twigg, of Buffalo, for lieutenant governor; Daniel Spector, of Brooklyn, for Comptroller; Michael Zagarell for attorney general; and Mildred Edelman, of Manhattan, for the U.S. Senate.

The Socialist Labor Party nominated John Emanuel for governor; and Robert E. Massi (born c. 1944), lawyer, of Brooklyn, for the U.S. Senate.

The U.S. Labor Party nominated Anton Chaitkin for governor; Victoria Staton for lieutenant governor; Leif O. Johnson, of Manhattan, for comptroller; Raymond M. Martino, of Goshen, for attorney general; and Elijah C. Boyd, Jr. (born c. 1944), of Manhattan, for the U.S. Senate.

== Result ==
The incumbents Levitt, Lefkowitz and Javits were re-elected. The incumbents Wilson and Stevens were defeated.

1974 state election results
Office	Democratic ticket		Republican ticket		Conservative ticket		Liberal ticket		Courage ticket		Free Libertarian ticket		Socialist Workers ticket		Communist ticket		Socialist Labor ticket		Labor ticket	
Governor	Hugh L. Carey	2,807,724	Malcolm Wilson	1,950,587	Malcolm Wilson	269,080	Hugh L. Carey	220,779	Wayne S. Amato	12,459	Jerry Tuccille	10,503	Derrick Morrison	8,857	Jose A. Ristorrucci	5,232	John Emanuel	4,574	Anton H. Chaitkin	3,151
Lieutenant Governor	Mary Anne Krupsak	2,807,724	Ralph G. Caso	1,950,587	Ralph G. Caso	269,080	Mary Anne Krupsak	220,779	Charles R. Schanger	12,459	Louis J. Sicilia	10,503	James Mendietta	8,857	Carol Twigg	5,232	(none)	4,574	Victoria Staton	3,151
Comptroller	Arthur Levitt	3,068,473	Stephen May	1,288,538	Bradley J. Hurd	244,701	Arthur Levitt	231,667			Robert S. Flanzer	10,535	Sam Manuel	14,504	Daniel Spector	8,085	(none)		Leif O. Johnson	7,691
Attorney General	Robert Abrams	2,189,654	Louis J. Lefkowitz	2,367,014	Edward F. Campbell	232,631	Louis J. Lefkowitz	257,623			Leland W. Schubert	8,092	Raymond H. Markey	12,283	Michael Zagarell	6,424	(none)		Raymond M. Martino	10,161
Judge of the Court of Appeals	Lawrence H. Cooke	2,461,771	Louis M. Greenblott	1,433,016	Henry S. Middendorf, Jr.	296,682	Lawrence H. Cooke	232,080			Melvin J. Hirshowitz	13,826					(none)			
Judge of the Court of Appeals	Jacob D. Fuchsberg	2,465,926	Harold A. Stevens	2,321,004	Harold A. Stevens		Harold A. Stevens				Jack A. Martin	14,779					(none)			
U.S. Senator	Ramsey Clark	1,973,781	Jacob K. Javits	2,098,529	Barbara A. Keating	822,584	Jacob K. Javits	241,659	William F. Dowling, Jr.	7,459	Percy L. Greaves, Jr.		Rebecca Finch	7,727	Mildred Edelman	3,876	Robert E. Massi	4,037	Elijah C. Boyd, Jr.	3,798

Obs.:

- The vote for governor is used to define ballot access, for automatic access are necessary 50,000 votes.

== Aftermath ==
This was the last time judges of the Court of Appeals were elected by popular ballot. After the election of Jacob D. Fuchsberg, who had entered the Democratic primary by petition, gathering signatures, the political and legal establishment thought that the filling of vacancies on the State's highest court could not be entrusted to the electorate anymore. Traditionally, the nominees had been selected by the party leaders and ratified by the state conventions from among the most experienced and respected judges of lower courts, with occasional intrusions of well-respected politicians who were lawyers, like Kenneth Keating. Even the New York City Bar Association had urged the defeat of Fuchsberg, a trial lawyer without any experience on the bench, who campaigned vigorously and spent much money on his campaign.

Traditionally, the nominees for the Court of Appeals did not campaign at all and just accompanied the remainder of the ticket, most of the nominees having bipartisan backing during the last 60 years. The impression arose that any shyster or ambulance chaser could get on the Court of Appeals if he was an enrolled party member and gathered signatures to get into the primary by petition and then spent a lot of money to make his name known to the voters. Thus, in 1977, the State Constitution was amended, and, since 1978, vacancies on the Court of Appeals have been filled by appointment: a judicial selection panel submits names to the governor, who nominates one from the list for confirmation by the New York State Senate.

== See also ==
- New York gubernatorial elections
- New York state elections

== Sources ==
- Official result: State Certifies Election Results; Carey's Margin Put at 808,836 in NYT on December 10, 1974 (subscription required)

New York State Red Book 1975
