= 1966 New York state election =

- November 8, 1965

The 1966 New York state election was held on November 8, 1966, to elect the governor, the lieutenant governor, the state comptroller, the attorney general and the Chief Judge of the New York Court of Appeals, as well as all members of the New York State Assembly and the New York State Senate. Besides, 15 delegates-at-large to the New York State Constitutional Convention of 1967 were elected on the state ticket, and three delegates each in the 57 senatorial districts.

== Background ==
Chief Judge Charles S. Desmond would reach the constitutional age limit of 70 years at the end of the year.

In 1965, the New York State Assembly districts had been re-apportioned to 165 numbered districts. This was ruled to be unconstitutional in 1966, and the number was reduced to 150 for this election.

== Nominations ==
The Socialist Labor state convention met on April 3, and nominated Milton Herder, owner of a Manhattan advertising agency, for governor; Doris Ballantyne 2d, a bookkeeper in the party's national office, for lieutenant governor; and John Emanuel for comptroller.

The Socialist Workers Party met on July 24, and nominated Judith White, a "28-year-old brunette," for governor; Richard Garza for lieutenant governor; Ralph Levitt for comptroller; and taxi driver Paul Boutelle for attorney general. They filed a petition to nominate candidates in September. If the age was given correctly, Judith White was actually ineligible for the office; since 1822, the state Constitution requires a minimum age of thirty years to be elected governor.

The Conservative state convention met on September 7 at Saratoga Springs, New York, and nominated Prof. Paul L. Adams, an enrolled Republican, for governor; Kieran O'Doherty for lieutenant governor; Benjamin R. Crosby, of Riverdale, for comptroller; and Mason L. Hampton, Jr., for attorney general; and endorsed the Republican senior associate judge Stanley H. Fuld for chief judge.

The Democratic state convention met on September 7 at Buffalo, New York, and nominated New York City Council President Frank O'Connor for governor on the first ballot. Howard J. Samuels was the only other contender. The convention met again on September 8, and nominated Samuels for lieutenant governor, revolting against the party bosses who had selected Orin Lehman. They completed the ticket with Mayor of Buffalo, New York Frank A. Sedita for attorney general; re-nominated the incumbent Comptroller Levitt; and endorsed the Republican senior associate judge Stanley H. Fuld for chief judge.

The Republican state convention met on September 8 at Rochester, New York, and renominated the incumbents Rockefeller, Wilson and Lefkowitz; and completed the ticket with Oneida County Executive Charles T. Lanigan for comptroller; and senior associate judge Stanley H. Fuld for chief judge.

The Liberal state convention met on September 8, and nominated Franklin D. Roosevelt, Jr., for governor on the first ballot, polling 209 out of 312 votes. They also nominated the Rev. Donald S. Harrington for lieutenant governor; for attorney general; and endorsed the Democratic incumbent comptroller Levitt for re-election and the Republican senior associate judge Stanley H. Fuld for chief judge.

== Result ==
Almost the whole Republican ticket was elected, and only the Democratic comptroller Levitt managed to stay in office with the help of the Liberals.

The incumbents Rockefeller, Wilson, Levitt and Lefkowitz were re-elected.

1966 state election results
Office	Republican ticket		Democratic ticket		Conservative ticket		Liberal ticket		Socialist Labor ticket		Socialist Workers ticket	
Governor	Nelson A. Rockefeller	2,690,626	Frank D. O'Connor	2,298,363	Paul L. Adams	513,023	Franklin D. Roosevelt, Jr.	507,234	Milton Herder	12,730	Judith White	12,506
Lieutenant Governor	Malcolm Wilson	2,690,626	Howard J. Samuels	2,298,363	Kieran O'Doherty	513,023	Donald S. Harrington	507,234	Doris Ballantyne	12,730	Richard Garza	12,506
Comptroller	Charles T. Lanigan	1,861,450	Arthur Levitt	3,084,981	Benjamin R. Crosby	331,467	Arthur Levitt	225,124	John Emanuel	11,177	Ralph Levitt	14,609
Attorney General	Louis J. Lefkowitz	3,062,355	Frank A. Sedita	2,033,981	Mason L. Hampton, Jr.	322,693	Simeon Golar	284,813	(none)		Paul Boutelle	12,333
Chief Judge	Stanley H. Fuld	2,341,483	Stanley H. Fuld	2,389,789	Stanley H. Fuld	326,377	Stanley H. Fuld	365,575	(none)		(none)	

Note: The vote for governor is used to define ballot access; for automatic access are necessary 50,000 votes.

== Delegates to the Constitutional Convention ==
The delegates-at-large were elected on party lists; the candidates' names did not appear on the ballot.

99 Democrats, 82 Republicans, three Liberals and two Conservatives were declared elected to the New York State Constitutional Convention of 1967; among them 10 Democrats, three Liberals (Harrington, Dubinsky, Rose) and two Republicans at-large. One Democratic seat in the 33rd District (The Bronx) was contested in the courts, and the New York Court of Appeals declared it a tie, ordering a special election which was won by a Republican. Thus the convention had a Democratic/Liberal majority of 101 against 85 Republicans and Conservatives. The new state constitution proposed by this body was ultimately rejected by the voters at the subsequent election.

1966 election tickets for delegates at-large
Democratic ticket	Republican ticket	Liberal ticket	Conservative ticket
Robert F. Wagner, Jr.	Frank C. Moore	Robert F. Wagner, Jr.	Frank C. Moore
Don M. Mankiewicz	William E. Bensley	Don M. Mankiewicz	William E. Bensley
Arthur Levitt, Jr.	Amory Houghton	Arthur Levitt, Jr.	Amory Houghton
Donald S. Harrington	Kenneth B. Keating	Donald S. Harrington	
Marietta Tree	William F. Walsh	Marietta Tree	
David Dubinsky	Russell Niles	David Dubinsky	
Bernard Botein	Clifford Furnas	Bernard Botein	
Henry L. Ughetta;	William Hughes Mulligan	Henry L. Ughetta	
Alan K. Campbell	Edward J. Speno	Alan K. Campbell	
Alex Rose	Ruth Gross	Alex Rose	
William J. vanden Heuvel	Ronnie Foster	William J. vanden Heuvel	
Andrew R. Tyler	Santiago Grevi	Andrew R. Tyler	
Antonia Pantoja	Sandy Ray	Antonia Pantoja	
John H. Doerr	J. Lee Rankin	J. Lee Rankin	
Monroe Goldwater	Jacob K. Javits	Jacob K. Javits	Edward Diedrich

== See also ==
- New York gubernatorial elections
- New York state elections

== Sources ==
- Official result: DEMOCRATS GAIN CONVENTION RULE IN STATE CANVASS; Conservatives Obtain Third Line on the Ballot When They Outpoll Liberals; Court Fight Is Possible on Democrats' 102-84 Edge in Constitutional Parley; Challenge Still Possible; Police Board a Factor; Record Governorship Vote in NYT on December 16, 1966 (subscription required)
- Charter Revision in the Empire State - The Politics of New York's 1967 Constitutional Convention by Henrik N. Dullea (The Rockefeller Institute Press)

New York Red Book 1967
