= 1966 New York gubernatorial election =

- November 8, 1966
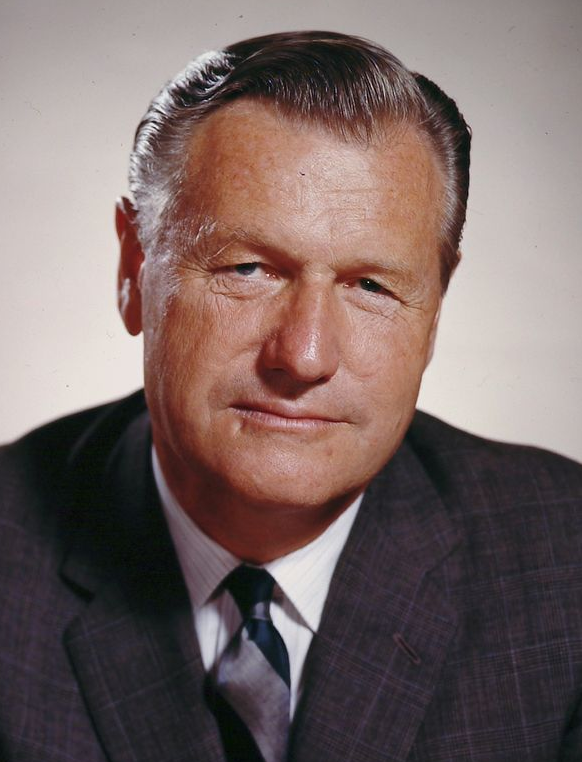

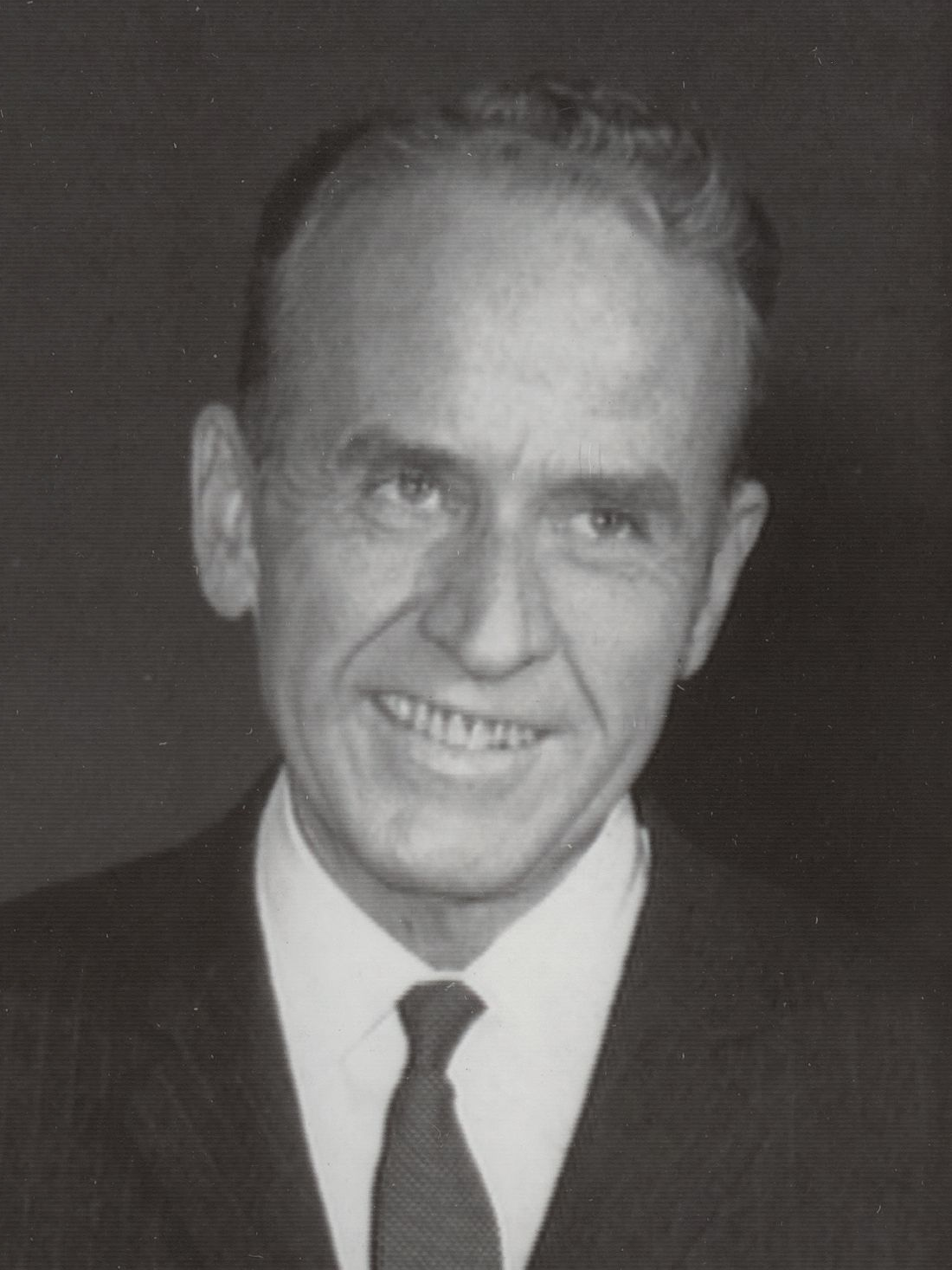

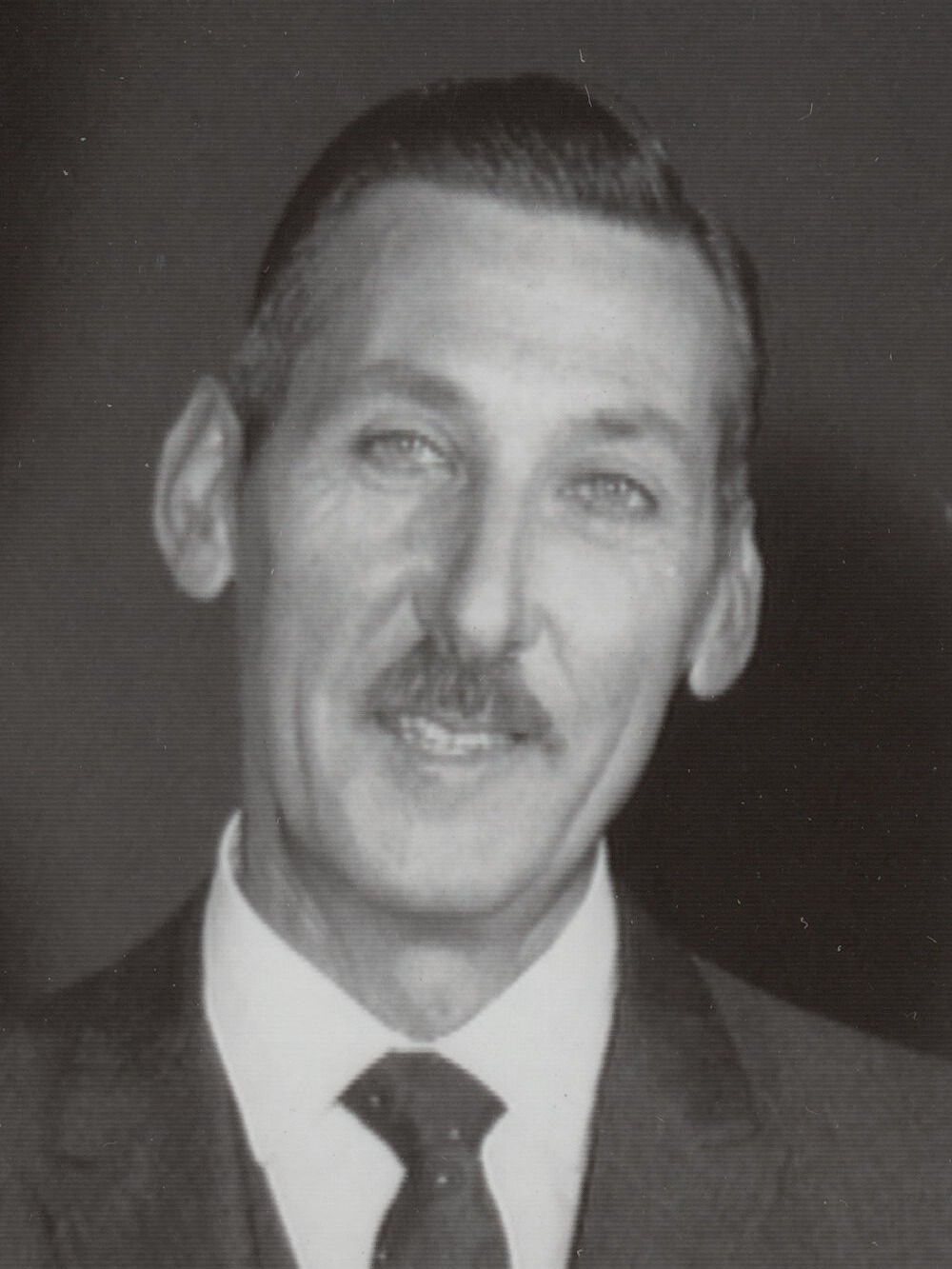

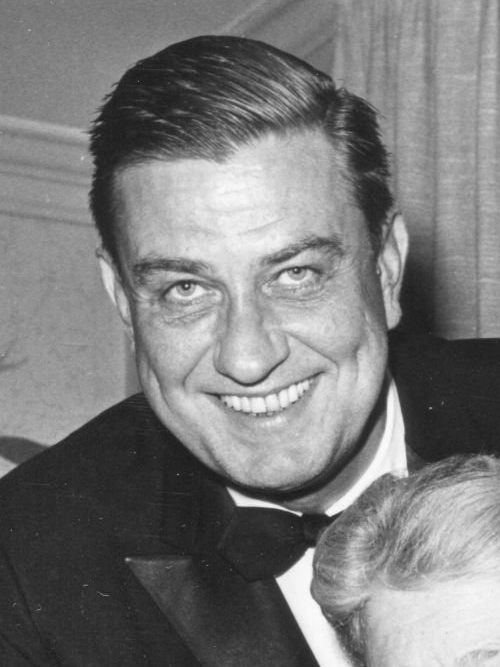
Nominee	Nelson Rockefeller	Frank D. O'Connor
Party	Republican	Democratic
Running mate	Malcolm Wilson	Howard J. Samuels
Popular vote	2,690,626	2,298,363
Percentage	44.61%	38.11%
Candidate	Paul L. Adams	Franklin Delano Roosevelt Jr.
Party	Conservative	Liberal
Running mate	Kieran O'Doherty	Donald S. Harrington
Popular vote	510,023	507,234
Percentage	8.46%	8.41%
- Rockefeller: 30–40% 40–50% 50–60% 60–70% 70–80% 80–90% O'Connor: 30–40% 40–50% 50–60% 60–70% Tie: 40–50%
Governor before election
Nelson Rockefeller
Republican
Elected Governor
Nelson Rockefeller
Republican

The 1966 New York gubernatorial election was held on November 8, 1966, to elect the governor and lieutenant governor of New York. Republican incumbent Nelson Rockefeller was re-elected to a third term in office over Frank D. O'Connor, Paul L. Adams, and Franklin D. Roosevelt Jr.

As of 2026, this is the last time Manhattan (New York County) voted for a Republican candidate in a statewide election.

== Background ==
Governor Nelson Rockefeller angered conservatives by refusing to support Republican nominee Barry Goldwater during the 1964 presidential election, and the nascent Conservative Party of New York placed a strong third in the 1965 New York City mayoral election. Polling showed Rockefeller behind potential Democratic nominees Eugene Nickerson, Frank D. O'Connor, Franklin D. Roosevelt Jr., Howard J. Samuels, or Robert F. Wagner Jr. The Liberal Party of New York also opposed Rockefeller, who fought for control of the Republican Party with New York City mayor John Lindsay and U.S. senator Jacob Javits, more liberal politicians whom the party had supported in prior elections. Party chairman Donald S. Harrington viewed the governor as "too conservative."

== Democratic nomination ==
=== Candidates ===
- Frank D. O'Connor, president of the New York City Council and former Queens district attorney (also running as Liberal)
- Howard J. Samuels, industrialist and 1962 candidate for governor

==== Declined ====
- Robert F. Wagner Jr., former mayor of New York City
- Eugene Nickerson, Nassau County executive

=== Convention results ===
Democratic Party Convention results
Party	Candidate	Votes	%
Democratic	Frank D. O'Connor	569	80.60
Democratic	Howard J. Samuels	137	19.41
Total votes		706	100.00

== Liberal nomination ==
=== Candidates ===
- James Farmer, national director of the Congress of Racial Equality (nominated at convention)
- Franklin D. Roosevelt Jr., chair of the U.S. Equal Employment Opportunity commission, former U.S. representative from Manhattan, and son of Franklin D. Roosevelt

==== Rejected ====
- Frank D. O'Connor, president of the New York City Council and former Queens district attorney (also running as Democratic)

=== Campaign ===
Members of the party wanted to run an independent campaign rather than cross-endorsing another party's nominee, and a canvass of party units showed they wanted an independent candidate.

Franklin D. Roosevelt Jr. lobbied the party's leadership for their nomination for months with support from David Dubinsky, who produced polling showing Roosevelt receiving at least one-fourth of the vote.

Despite O'Connor's earlier vote against cross-endorsements as a state legislator, he courted the Liberals by appointing Eldon R. Clingan to his staff and promising Alex Rose that if he were cross-endorsed, the Liberals would be equals in his campaign. O'Connor was also close to party bosses Charles A. Buckley and Irwin Steingut, whom the Liberals opposed, and Roosevelt claimed O'Connor was secretly promised the Democratic gubernatorial nomination in exchange for withdrawing from the 1965 New York City mayoral election. President Lyndon B. Johnson and vice president Hubert Humphrey pressured the Liberals to support O'Connor. Although O'Connor was supported by former Liberal party chairman Adolf A. Berle, Rose criticized Berle as "not even a member of our organization." On August 9, the Liberal Policy Committee voted unanimously to not support him. After O'Connor was rejected, Roosevelt supporters felt he had secured the nomination, but Louis Stulberg and other leaders of the International Ladies Garment Workers Union opposed Roosevelt over his decision to leave the party after the 1949 election.

=== Convention results ===
At the convention, Leo Koch nominated James Farmer to oppose Roosevelt, but Roosevelt won the party's nomination easily. Murray Kempton claimed that the convention was under the thumb of its chair, "comrade secretary" Ben Davidson. Harrington was selected as the lieutenant gubernatorial nominee.

1966 New York gubernatorial Liberal Party ballot
Party	Candidate	Votes	%	±%
Liberal	Franklin D. Roosevelt Jr.	209	82.28%	
Liberal	James Farmer	33	12.99%	
Liberal	Abstain	12	4.72%	
Total votes		254	100.00%	
	Did not vote	67		

== Conservative nomination ==
=== Candidates ===
- Paul L. Adams, academic dean of Roberts Wesleyan College
- John J. O'Leary
- Donald H. Serrell

=== Convention results ===
Conservative Party convention results
Party	Candidate	Votes	%
Conservative	Paul L. Adams	239	74.92
Conservative	Donald H. Serrell	68	21.32
Conservative	John J. O'Leary	12	3.76
Total votes		319	100.00

== General election ==
=== Candidates ===
- Paul L. Adams, academic dean of Roberts Wesleyan College (Conservative)
  - Running mate: Kieran O'Doherty, founding chair of the Conservative Party and 1962 U.S. Senate nominee
- Milton Herder (Socialist Labor)
- Frank D. O'Connor, president of the New York City Council and former Queens district attorney (Democratic)
  - Running mate: Howard J. Samuels, industrialist and 1962 candidate for governor
- Nelson Rockefeller, incumbent governor since 1959 (Republican)
  - Running mate: Malcolm Wilson, incumbent lieutenant governor since 1959
- Franklin D. Roosevelt Jr., chair of the U.S. Equal Employment Opportunity commission, former U.S. representative from Manhattan, and son of Franklin D. Roosevelt (Liberal)
  - Running mate: Donald S. Harrington, Unitarian Universalist minister and chair of the Liberal Party
- Judith White (Socialist Workers)

This was the last gubernatorial election to have no parties utilize electoral fusion.

=== Results ===
Roosevelt received the highest number of votes for any Liberal gubernatorial nominee in history. However, the Liberals received fewer votes than the Conservatives and fell from Row C to Row D.

New York gubernatorial election, 1966
Party	Candidate	Votes	%	±%
Republican	Nelson Rockefeller (incumbent)	2,690,626	44.61%	▼8.47
Democratic	Frank D. O'Connor	2,298,363	38.11%	▼5.86
Conservative	Paul L. Adams	510,023	8.46%	▲6.02
Liberal	Franklin Delano Roosevelt Jr.	507,234	8.41%	▲4.23
Socialist Labor	Milton Herder	12,730	0.21%	▲0.04
Socialist Workers	Judith White	12,506	0.21%	▼0.13
Majority		392,263	6.50%	−2.62%
Turnout		6,031,482		
Republican hold				

== Works cited ==
- Benjamin, Gerald; Catalano, Michael (2020). Beyond Donkeys and Elephants: Minor Political Parties in Contemporary American Politics. University Press of Kansas. doi:10.2307/j.ctv15tt76n. ISBN 978-0-7006-2929-9.
- Soyer, Daniel (2021). Left in the Center: The Liberal Party of New York and the Rise and Fall of American Social Democracy. Cornell University Press. ISBN 9781501759888. JSTOR 10.7591/j.ctv1hw3x50.2.
