= Harold A. Stevens =

American lawyer and judge (1907–1990)

Harold Arnoldus Stevens (October 19, 1907 – November 9, 1990) was an American lawyer and judge who served on the New York Court of General Sessions and New York Court of Appeals.

== Early life and education ==
He was born on October 19, 1907, in Johns Island, South Carolina, the William F. Stevens and Lilla L. (Johnson) Stevens. His father died when he was three years old and Harold left Johns Island, and moved to Columbia, South Carolina with his mother and maternal grandparents, the Reverend and Mrs. C.H. Johnson. Later his mother remarried. Harold attended Claflin College High School and earned a Bachelor's Degree from Benedict College in 1930. He headed to Boston, after he was rejected from the then-segregated University of South Carolina Law School. In 1936 he was the first black American to get an LL.B. degree in labor law from Boston College.

In the 1940s he was a counsel to the Brotherhood of Sleeping Car Porters and the Provisional Committee to Organize Colored Locomotive Firemen. He was a veteran of World War II. He was a member of the New York State Assembly (New York Co., 13th D.) from 1947 to 1950, sitting in the 166th and 167th New York State Legislatures.

== Service as a judge ==
In 1950, he was elected to the New York Court of General Sessions. In 1955, he was appointed by Governor W. Averell Harriman to the New York Supreme Court to fill a vacancy. In November 1955, he was elected to a fourteen-year term. He sat on the Appellate Division (1st Dept.) from 1958 on, and was Presiding Justice from 1969 on.

In January 1974, Governor Malcolm Wilson appointed him to the New York Court of Appeals to fill the vacancy caused by the election of Charles D. Breitel as Chief Judge. This gave him the highest rank of any black American in a state judicial system; he was the first African American to hold a seat on the Court of Appeals. In 1974, he ran on the Republican, Conservative and Liberal tickets for a full term, but was defeated by Democrat Jacob D. Fuchsberg. In 1975, he resumed his post as Presiding Justice of the Appellate Division (1st Dept.), and retired from the bench in 1977.

He died on November 9, 1990, at his home in Harlem, New York City.

== Other services ==
Judge Stevens served as a trustee or board member for many organizations, including St. Patrick's Cathedral, New York Medical College, New York University Law Center Foundation, the Council for Religious and International Affairs, and the National Center for State Courts. He served as a Special Council of Religious and International Affairs, and the National Center for State Courts. He served as a Special Counsel to President Roosevelt's Commission on Fair Employment Practices.

Harold Stevens received numerous awards and honorary degrees of national and international dimension, including the Pro Ecclesia et Pontifice award from Pope Pius XII, in recognition of outstanding Catholic service.

== See also ==
- List of African-American jurists
- List of first minority male lawyers and judges in New York

== Sources ==
- The History of the New York Court of Appeals, 1932-2003 by Bernard S. Meyer, Burton C. Agata & Seth H. Agata (pages 29f)
- Court of Appeals judges
- Justices of the Court (Historical): Harold A. Stevens
- Judge Harold Stevens, 83, Dies; First Black on Court of Appeals in NYT on November 11, 1990

New York State Assembly
Preceded by Daniel Flynn	New York State Assembly; New York County, 13th District; 1947–1950	Succeeded by Orest V. Maresca
