= Arthur Levitt Sr. =

American politician (1900–1980)

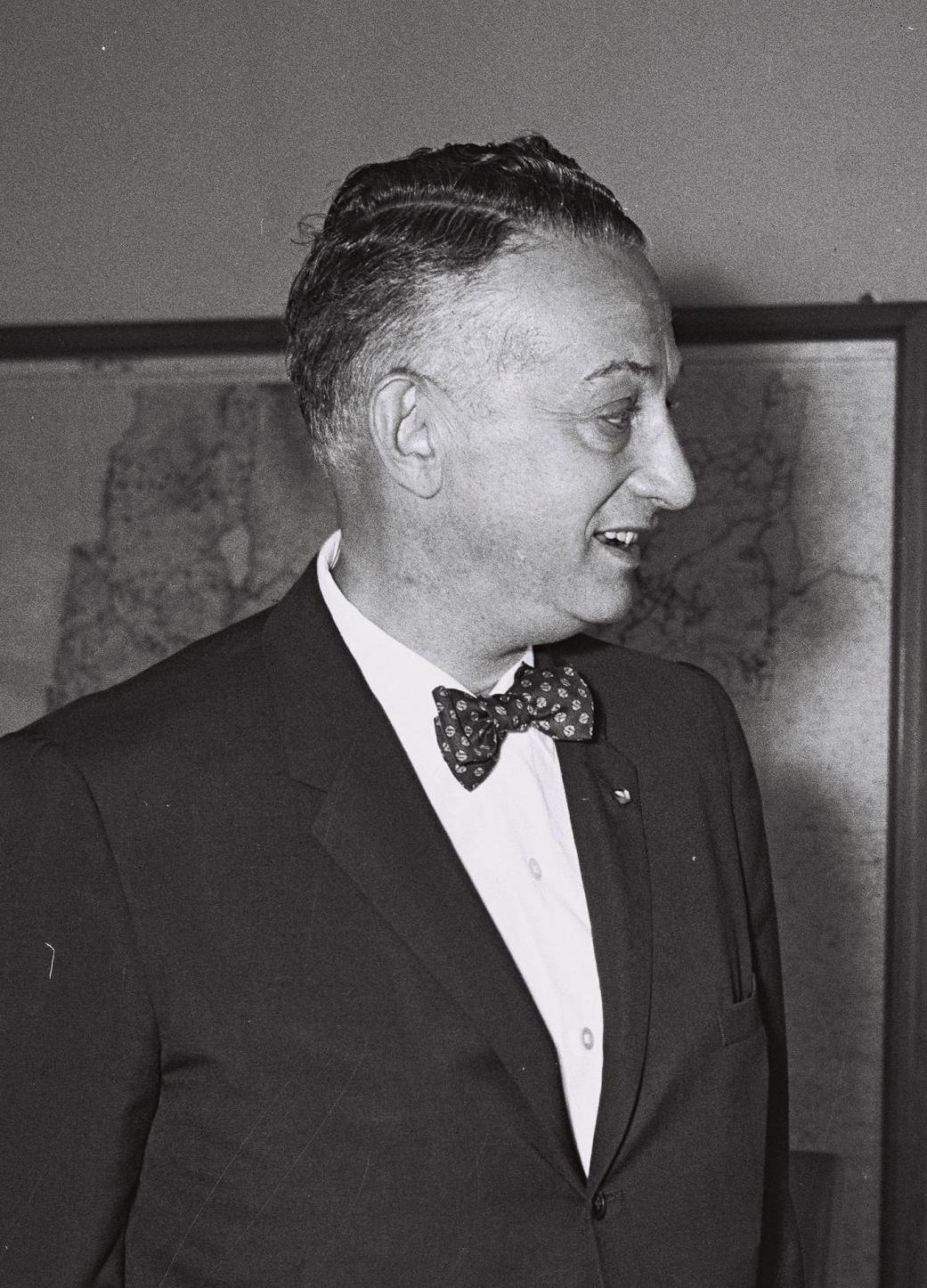
- Levitt in 1959

50th Comptroller of New York
- In office January 1, 1955 – December 31, 1978
- Governor: W. Averell Harriman; Nelson Rockefeller; Malcolm Wilson; Hugh Carey
- Preceded by: J. Raymond McGovern
- Succeeded by: Edward Regan

Personal details
- Born: June 28, 1900 New York City, U.S.
- Died: May 6, 1980 (aged 79) New York City. U.S.
- Party: Democratic
- Children: Arthur Levitt
- Education: Columbia University (BA, LL.B)

Military service
- Branch/service: United States Army
- Rank: Colonel
- Battles/wars: World War I World War II

Arthur Levitt Sr. (June 28, 1900 – May 6, 1980) was an American lawyer and politician who served as the 50th New York State Comptroller from 1955 to 1978.

== Early life ==
Levitt was born into a Jewish family in Brooklyn in 1900, to parents Israel Levitt and Rose Daniels. He served in the U.S. Army in World War I and World War II, finishing the latter as a colonel. After leaving the military, he earned degrees from Columbia University and Columbia Law School. While attending Columbia College, Levitt was initiated into the Alpha chapter of Phi Sigma Delta which later merged into Zeta Beta Tau fraternity.

== Career ==
Levitt served on the New York State Board of Education from 1952 to 1954.

Levitt was New York State comptroller from 1955 to 1978, elected on the Democratic and Liberal tickets in 1954, 1958, 1962, 1966, 1970 and 1974, the longest-serving person in this office. He was a delegate to the 1956, 1960 and 1964 Democratic National Conventions.

In 1961, he was the Tammany Hall regular candidate for the Democratic nomination for mayor of New York City, but was defeated in the primary by incumbent Mayor Robert F. Wagner Jr. who had broken with Tammany's leader, Carmine DeSapio.

Levitt was granted an honorary degree from Hamilton College in 1979. The Arthur Levitt Public Affairs Center on the Hamilton College campus is named in his honor.

== Personal life ==
Levitt married Dorothy Wolff. They had a son, Arthur Levitt Jr., who was chairman of the United States Securities and Exchange Commission from 1993 to 2001.

After retiring as comptroller, Levitt became an investment advisor with Lincoln Savings Bank, headquartered at the Pan Am Building. He suffered a fatal heart attack at his office there on May 6, 1980, aged 79.

Party political offices
Preceded by Spencer C. Young	Democratic nominee for New York State Comptroller; 1954, 1958, 1962, 1966, 1970, 1972	Succeeded by Harrison J. Goldin
Political offices
Preceded by J. Raymond McGovern	New York State Comptroller; 1955–1978	Succeeded by Edward Regan
