= Louis J. Lefkowitz =

American politician

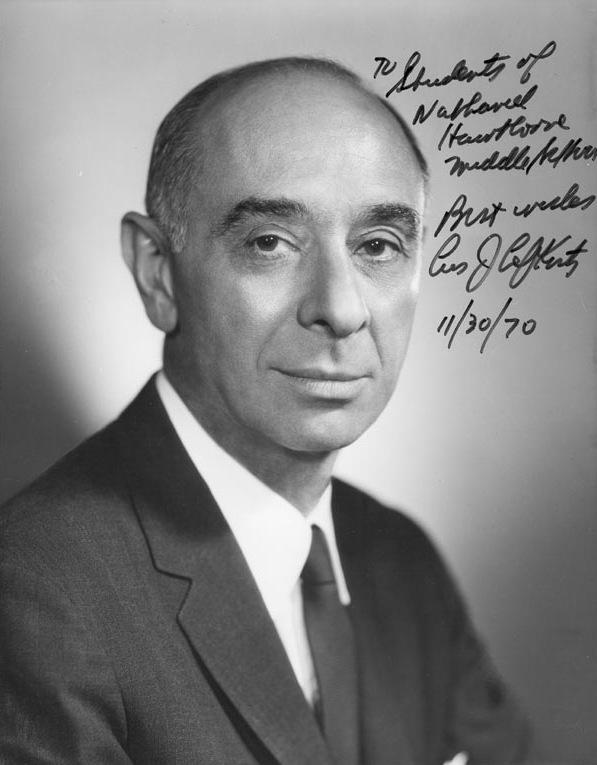
- Portrait by Fabian Bachrach c. 1970

59th Attorney General of New York
- In office January 10, 1957 – December 31, 1978
- Governor: W. Averell Harriman; Nelson Rockefeller; Malcolm Wilson; Hugh Carey
- Preceded by: Jacob K. Javits
- Succeeded by: Robert Abrams

Member of the New York State Assembly from the 6th New York district
- In office January 1, 1928 – December 31, 1930
- Preceded by: Morris Weinfeld
- Succeeded by: Irving D. Neustein

Personal details
- Born: July 3, 1904 Manhattan, New York, U.S.
- Died: June 20, 1996 (aged 91) Manhattan, New York, U.S.
- Party: Republican
- Spouse: Helen Schwimmer (m. 1931; died 1986)
- Children: 2
- Education: The High School of Commerce (1921); Fordham Law School (1925)
- Profession: Lawyer, judge, politician

Louis J. Lefkowitz (July 3, 1904 – June 20, 1996) was an American lawyer and politician. He served as the Attorney General of New York State for 22 years. He was a Republican.

== Early life and education ==
Lefkowitz was born to a Jewish family in Manhattan, New York City, the son of Samuel Lefkowitz and Mollie (Isaacs) Lefkowitz, and brother of Leo Lefkowitz and Helen (Lefkowitz) Schlesinger.

He attended P.S. 188 and then The High School of Commerce in New York City and graduated at the age of 16 in 1921. He didn't attend college after high school but worked full-time as a law clerk and served summonses. While still working full-time, he went on to study law in the evening division of Fordham Law School In New York City beginning in 1922.

Lefkowitz graduated from Fordham Law School in 1925.

== Political career ==
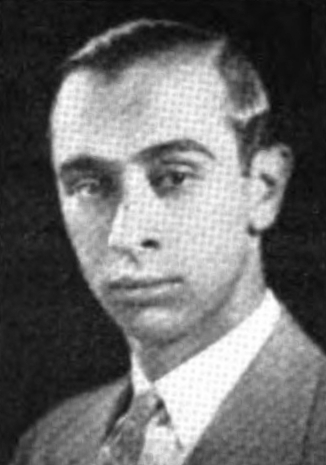
Lefkowitz's official State Assembly portrait, 1928

Lefkowitz was a member of the New York State Assembly (New York Co., 6th D.) in 1928, 1929 and 1930. In 1935, he was appointed a municipal judge by mayor Fiorello La Guardia.

In 1957, Lefkowitz was elected by the New York State Legislature as New York Attorney General, to succeed Jacob K. Javits, who resigned after being elected to the U.S. Senate the previous year. Lefkowitz was re-elected in 1958, 1962, 1966, 1970 and 1974, holding the office for 22 years, the longest tenure since the office was established in 1777.

In 1961, he was the Republican candidate for Mayor of New York City. He lost to the then sitting mayor, Democrat Robert F. Wagner Jr.

Lefkowitz was a delegate to the 1944, 1948, 1960, and 1964 Republican National Conventions, and an alternate delegate to the 1956 Republican National Convention. He was a moderate or even liberal Republican and part of the Thomas E. Dewey and Nelson A. Rockefeller faction of the New York Republican Party.

Lefkowitz died from Parkinson's disease at his home in Manhattan.

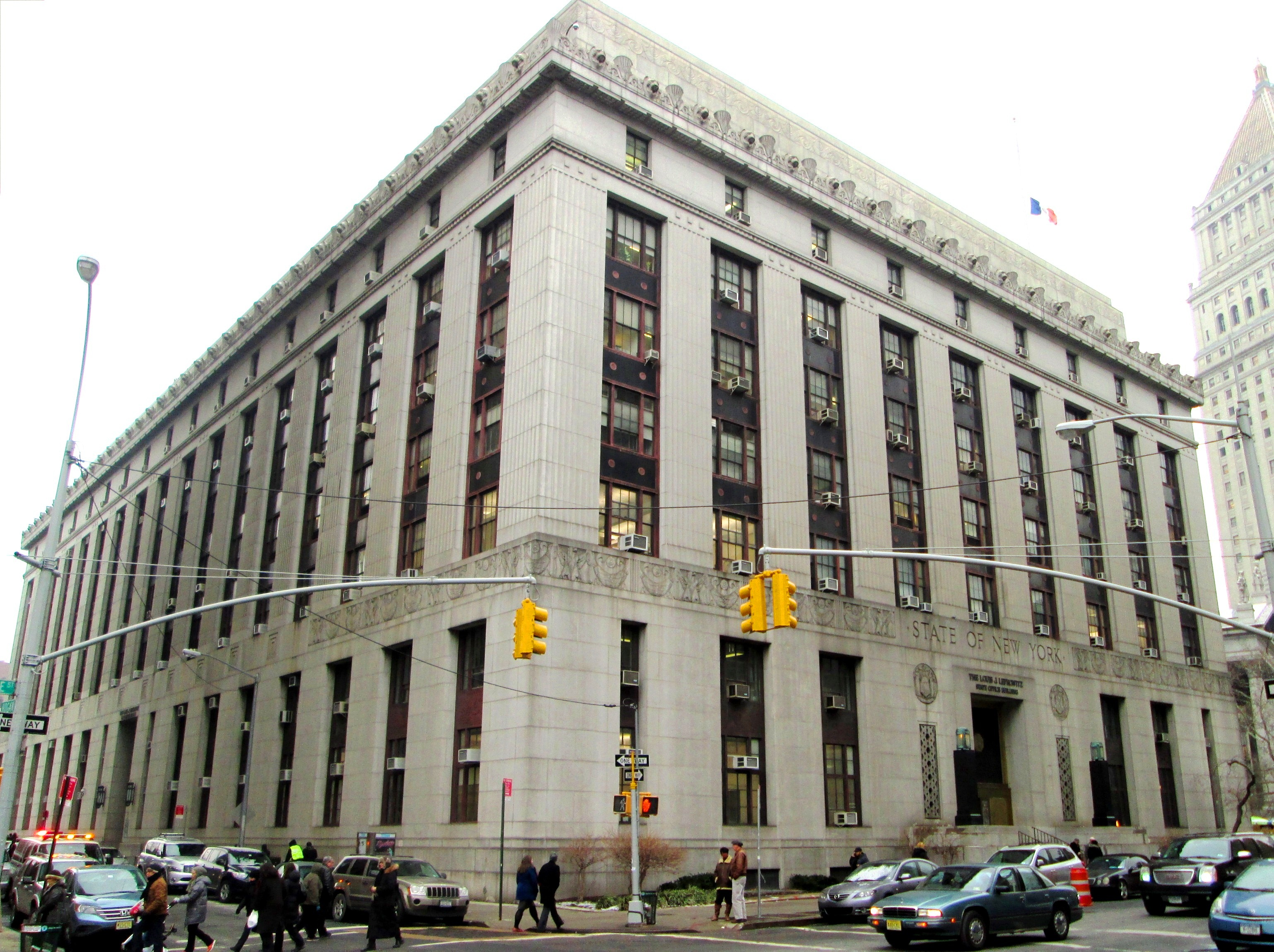
The Louis J. Lefkowitz State Office Building

The Louis J. Lefkowitz State Office Building at 80 Centre Street in the Civic Center district of Manhattan was named for him.

== Personal life ==
On June 14, 1931, he married Helen Schwimmer (1908–1986). They had a son, Stephen Lefkowitz, a lawyer and professor of Law, and a daughter, Joan Lefkowitz Feinbloom.

== See also ==
- List of Jewish American jurists

New York State Assembly
Preceded by Morris Weinfeld	New York State Assembly; New York County, 6th District; 1928–1930	Succeeded by Irving D. Neustein
Legal offices
Preceded by Jacob K. Javits	Attorney General of New York; 1957–1979	Succeeded by Robert Abrams
Party political offices
Preceded by Jacob Javits	Republican nominee for Attorney General of New York; 1958, 1962, 1966, 1970, 1974	Succeeded by Michael Roth
Preceded by Robert Christenberry	Republican Nominee for Mayor of New York City; 1961	Succeeded by John V. Lindsay
