= 1958 New York state election =

- November 4, 1958

The 1958 New York state election was held on November 4, 1958, to elect the governor, the lieutenant governor, the state comptroller, the attorney general, a judge of the New York Court of Appeals and a U.S. senator, as well as all members of the New York State Assembly and the New York State Senate.

== Background ==
In January 1957, Jacob K. Javits took his seat in the U.S. Senate and thus vacated the office of New York State Attorney General. On January 9, the New York State Legislature elected Louis J. Lefkowitz to the office for the unexpired term.

Marvin R. Dye had been elected to the Court of Appeals in 1944, thus his 14-year term would expire at the end of the year.

== Nominations ==
The Socialist Labor state convention met on March 23 and nominated Eric Hass for governor; John Emanuel for lieutenant governor; Milton Herder for state comptroller; and Stephen Emery for U.S. Senator. The ticket was ruled off the ballot, but Hass and his fellow nominees continued to campaign as write-in candidates.

The "United Independent Socialist Campaign Committee" met on July 17 and selected John T. McManus for governor; and Dr. Annette T. Rubinstein for lieutenant governor.

The Independent-Socialist Party filed a petition to nominate candidates to five offices on September 9 with the Secretary of State.

The Democratic state convention met on August 25 at Buffalo, New York, and re-nominated Governor W. Averell Harriman and Lt. Gov. George B. DeLuca. The convention continued on August 26 and into the early hours of August 27. They nominated D.A. of New York Frank S. Hogan for the U.S. Senate after a roll call (vote: Hogan 772, Thomas E. Murray 304).

The Republican state convention met on August 26 at Rochester, New York, and nominated Nelson A. Rockefeller for governor.

The Liberal Party met on August 26, and endorsed the Democratic nominees Harriman, DeLuca and Levitt; and nominated Thomas K. Finletter for the U.S. Senate. On August 28, Finletter declined to run, and urged the Liberals to back Hogan. On September 4, the Liberals substituted Democrat Hogan for Finletter on the ticket, but rejected the endorsement of Crotty. They completed the ticket with Edward Goodell for attorney general.

== Result ==
Despite a good year for the Democratic Party nationwide, almost the whole Republican ticket was elected; only the Democratic Comptroller Arthur Levitt managed to stay in office.

The incumbents Levitt, Lefkowitz, and Dye were re-elected. The incumbents Harriman and DeLuca were defeated.

As of 2023, this is the last time the Republicans won the state's Class 1 Senate seat. (James L. Buckley was elected Senator for this seat in 1970 on the Conservative Party line, defeating appointed incumbent Republican Charles Goodell. Buckley caucused with Republicans in the Senate and ran for re-election as a Republican in 1976, but was defeated.)

1958 state election results
Office	Republican ticket		Democratic ticket		Liberal ticket		Independent-Socialist ticket	
Governor	Nelson A. Rockefeller	3,126,929	W. Averell Harriman	2,269,969	W. Averell Harriman	283,926	John T. McManus	31,658
Lieutenant Governor	Malcolm Wilson	3,126,929	George B. DeLuca	2,269,969	George B. DeLuca	283,926	Annette T. Rubinstein	31,658
Comptroller	James A. Lundy	2,763,795	Arthur Levitt	2,484,171	Arthur Levitt	294,575	Hugh Mulzac	34,038
Attorney General	Louis J. Lefkowitz	2,915,657	Peter J. Crotty	2,353,374	Edward Goodell	280,655	Scott K. Gray, Jr.	31,746
Judge of the Court of Appeals	Marvin R. Dye	2,739,522	Marvin R. Dye	2,400,650	Marvin R. Dye	290,566	(none)	
U.S. Senator	Kenneth B. Keating	2,842,942	Frank S. Hogan	2,434,899	Frank S. Hogan	275,051	Corliss Lamont	49,087

Note: The vote for governor is used to define ballot access, for automatic access are necessary 50,000 votes.

== See also ==
- 1958 United States Senate elections
- New York gubernatorial elections
- New York state elections

== Sources ==
- Vote totals in the New York Red Book (1959)
