= Robert C. Moot =

7th Administrator of the Small Business Administration
- In office August 1, 1967 – July 31, 1968
- President: Lyndon B. Johnson
- Preceded by: Bernard L. Boutin
- Succeeded by: Howard J. Samuels

Deputy Administrator of the Small Business Administration
- In office December 19, 1966 – August 1, 1967
- President: Lyndon B. Johnson

Personal details
- Born: June 1, 1911 Orange, New Jersey, U.S.
- Died: May 31, 2002 (aged 90) Fairfax, Virginia, U.S.
- Party: Democratic

Robert C. Moot (June 1, 1911 – May 31, 2002) was an American administrator who served as Administrator of the Small Business Administration from 1967 to 1968.
