= 1970 New York state election =

- November 3, 1970

The 1970 New York state election was held on November 3, 1970, to elect the governor, the lieutenant governor, the state comptroller, the attorney general and a U.S. senator, as well as all members of the New York State Assembly and the New York State Senate.

== Background ==
On June 6, 1968, U.S. Senator Robert F. Kennedy was assassinated. On September 10, Governor Rockefeller appointed Congressman Charles E. Goodell to serve for the remainder of Kennedy's term.

== Nominations ==
=== Democratic primary ===
The Democratic State Committee met on April 1 and 2 at Grossinger's Catskill Resort Hotel in Liberty, New York, and designated Arthur J. Goldberg for governor; Basil Paterson for lieutenant governor; the incumbent Arthur Levitt for comptroller; Adam Walinsky for attorney general; and Ted Sorensen for the U.S. Senate. The primary election was held on June 23. Paterson received the most votes.

1970 Democratic primary results
Office	Party designees		Challengers					
Governor	Arthur J. Goldberg	496,648	Howard J. Samuels	455,482				
Lieutenant Governor	Basil A. Paterson	594,751	Jerome A. Ambro, Jr.	240,235				
Comptroller	Arthur Levitt		(unopposed)					
Attorney General	Adam Walinsky	504,942	Robert R. Meehan	242,052				
U.S. Senator	Ted Sorensen	154,434	Richard L. Ottinger	366,789	Paul O'Dwyer	302,438	Max McCarthy	102,224

=== Other parties with ballot line ===
The Liberal State Committee met on April 4, and designated Party Chairman Rev. Donald S. Harrington for Governor; and Deputy Mayor of New York Timothy W. Costello for the U.S. Senate. They also endorsed the Democratic designees Paterson and Levitt, and the Republican designee Lefkowitz. Harrington and Costello withdrew on May 7, and on May 11 the State Committee endorsed Democrat Arthur J. Goldberg for Governor; and the incumbent Republican U.S. senator Charles E. Goodell.

The Republican State Committee met on April 7 at Rochester, New York, and designated the incumbents Rockefeller, Wilson, Lefkowitz and Goodell (the first three for re-election); and completed the ticket with Edward Regan for Comptroller.

The Conservative State Committee met on April 7, and designated again Prof. Paul L. Adams for governor, and James L. Buckley for the U.S. Senate. Adams had polled more than half a million votes in 1966, and Buckley more than a million in 1968. They also designated Edward F. Leonard for lieutenant governor; Anthony R. Spinelli for Comptroller; and Leo Kesselring, lawyer, of Rochester, for attorney general.

The Republican, Liberal and Conservative tickets designated by the state committees were not challenged in the primaries.

=== Minor parties ===
Eight parties filed petitions to nominate candidates.

The Socialist Workers Party nominated Clifton DeBerry for Governor; Jonathan Rothschild, a "30 years old Manhattan taxi driver," for lieutenant governor; Ms. Ruthann Miller (born c. 1940), for Comptroller; Miguel Padilla, Jr., 30, for Attorney General; and Ms. Kipp Dawson (born 1941) for the U.S. Senate.

The Communist Party nominated Clifton DeBerry for Governor; Mrs. Grace Mora Newman (born c. 1927), of The Bronx, for lieutenant governor; and Arnold Johnson for the U.S. Senate.

The "Civil Service Independents Party" nominated Gov. Rockefeller and Lt. Gov. Wilson for re-election.

The "Independent Alliance Party" nominated James L. Buckley for the U.S. Senate.

The "Courage Party," the New York state branch of the American Party, was ruled off the ballot on September 11 by Secretary of State John P. Lomenzo.

The "Conservation Party" nominated Richard L Ottinger for the U.S. Senate, but was ruled off the ballot by the Appellate Division on October 1, reversing an earlier New York Supreme Court decision. At the same time, the "Independent Alliance" which nominated James L. Buckley, was upheld. The appellate decision was upheld by the New York Court of Appeals on October 7.

== Result ==
At the height of the chaotic political situation during the Vietnam War, a Republican governor and lieutenant governor, a Democratic/Liberal comptroller, a Republican/Liberal attorney general and a Conservative U.S. Senator were elected.

The incumbents Rockefeller, Wilson, Levitt and Lefkowitz were re-elected. The incumbent Goodell was defeated.

1970 state election results
Office	Republican ticket		Democratic ticket		Conservative ticket		Liberal ticket		Communist ticket		Socialist Workers ticket		Socialist Labor ticket	
Governor	Nelson A. Rockefeller	3,151,432	Arthur J. Goldberg	2,158,355	Paul L. Adams	422,514	Arthur J. Goldberg	263,071	Rasheed Storey	7,760	Clifton DeBerry	5,766	Stephen Emery	3,963
Lieutenant Governor	Malcolm Wilson	3,151,432	Basil A. Paterson	2,158,355	Edward F. Leonard	422,514	Basil A. Paterson	263,071	Grace Mora Newman	7,760	Jonathan Rothschild	5,766	Arnold Babel	3,963
Comptroller	Edward V. Regan	1,853,142	Arthur Levitt	2,881,642	Anthony R. Spinelli	436,584	Arthur Levitt	303,941	(none)		Ruthann Miller	14,071	Walter Steinhilber	6,908
Attorney General	Louis J. Lefkowitz	2,891,969	Adam Walinsky	1,886,631	Leo Kesselring	409,169	Louis J. Lefkowitz	321,865	(none)		Miguel Padilla, Jr.	14,306	(none)	
U.S. Senator	Charles E. Goodell	1,178,679	Richard L. Ottinger	2,171,232	James L. Buckley	2,288,190	Charles E. Goodell	225,793	Arnold Johnson	4,097	Kipp M. Dawson	3,549	John Emanuel	3,204

Obs.:

- The vote for governor is used to define ballot access, for automatic access are necessary 50,000 votes.
- The number for Rockefeller/Wilson includes 46,212 votes polled on the Civil Service Independent ticket.
- Buckley polled 2,179,640 votes on the Conservative ticket and 108,550 on the Independent Alliance ticket.

== See also ==
- New York gubernatorial elections
- New York state elections

== Sources ==
- Official result of Democratic primary: GOLDBERG'S VICTORY WAS BY 41,592 VOTES in NYT on July 12, 1970 (subscription required)
- Official result: 7,760 Voted for Communist as Governor in NYT on December 16, 1970 (subscription required)

New York Red Book 1971
