= J. Raymond McGovern =

American politician

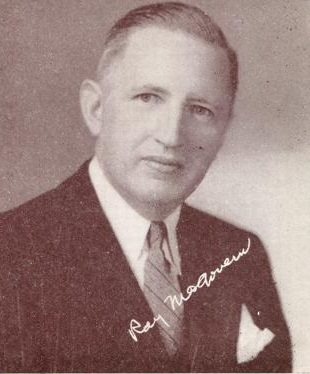
- Photo from 1950 campaign for state comptroller

49th New York State Comptroller
- In office January 1, 1951 – December 31, 1954
- Governor: Thomas E. Dewey
- Preceded by: Frank C. Moore
- Succeeded by: Arthur Levitt, Sr.

Member of the New York Senate from the 30th district
- In office January 1, 1945 – December 31, 1950
- Preceded by: Julian B. Erway
- Succeeded by: Frank S. McCullough

Personal details
- Born: December 22, 1898 New Rochelle, New York, U.S.
- Died: March 14, 1974 (aged 75) New Rochelle, New York, U.S.
- Resting place: Holy Sepulchre Cemetery, New Rochelle, New York
- Party: Republican
- Spouse: Elsie B. Schork (m. 1936)
- Children: 4
- Education: Fordham University (BA, LL.B)
- Profession: Attorney

J. Raymond McGovern (December 22, 1898 – March 14, 1974) was an American lawyer and politician. he served in the New York State Senate for three two-year terms (1946 to 1950), and as New York State Comptroller from 1951 to 1954.

== Early life and education ==
He was born on December 22, 1898, in New Rochelle, New York. McGovern graduated from Fordham University and the Fordham University School of Law.

== Career ==
He was a partner in the law firm of McGovern, Connelly & Davidson in New Rochelle.

He was a member of the New York State Senate from 1945 to 1950. He served as New York State Comptroller from 1951 to 1954, elected on the Republican ticket at the New York state election, 1950. In 1954, he ran for Lieutenant Governor of New York as the running mate of Irving Ives, but they were narrowly defeated by the Democratic–Liberal Party nominees.

== Death ==
He died on March 14, 1974, in New Rochelle, New York.

== Sources ==
- Political Graveyard

Political offices
Preceded by Julian B. Erway	New York State Senate; 30th District; 1945–1950	Succeeded by Frank S. McCullough
Preceded by Frank C. Moore	New York State Comptroller; 1951–1954	Succeeded by Arthur Levitt, Sr.
Party political offices
Preceded by Frank C. Moore	Republican nominee for New York State Comptroller; 1950	Succeeded by Frank Del Vecchio
Preceded by Frank C. Moore	Republican Party Nominee for Lieutenant Governor of New York; 1954	Succeeded by Malcolm Wilson
