= Basil A. Paterson =

American politician and lawyer (1926–2014)

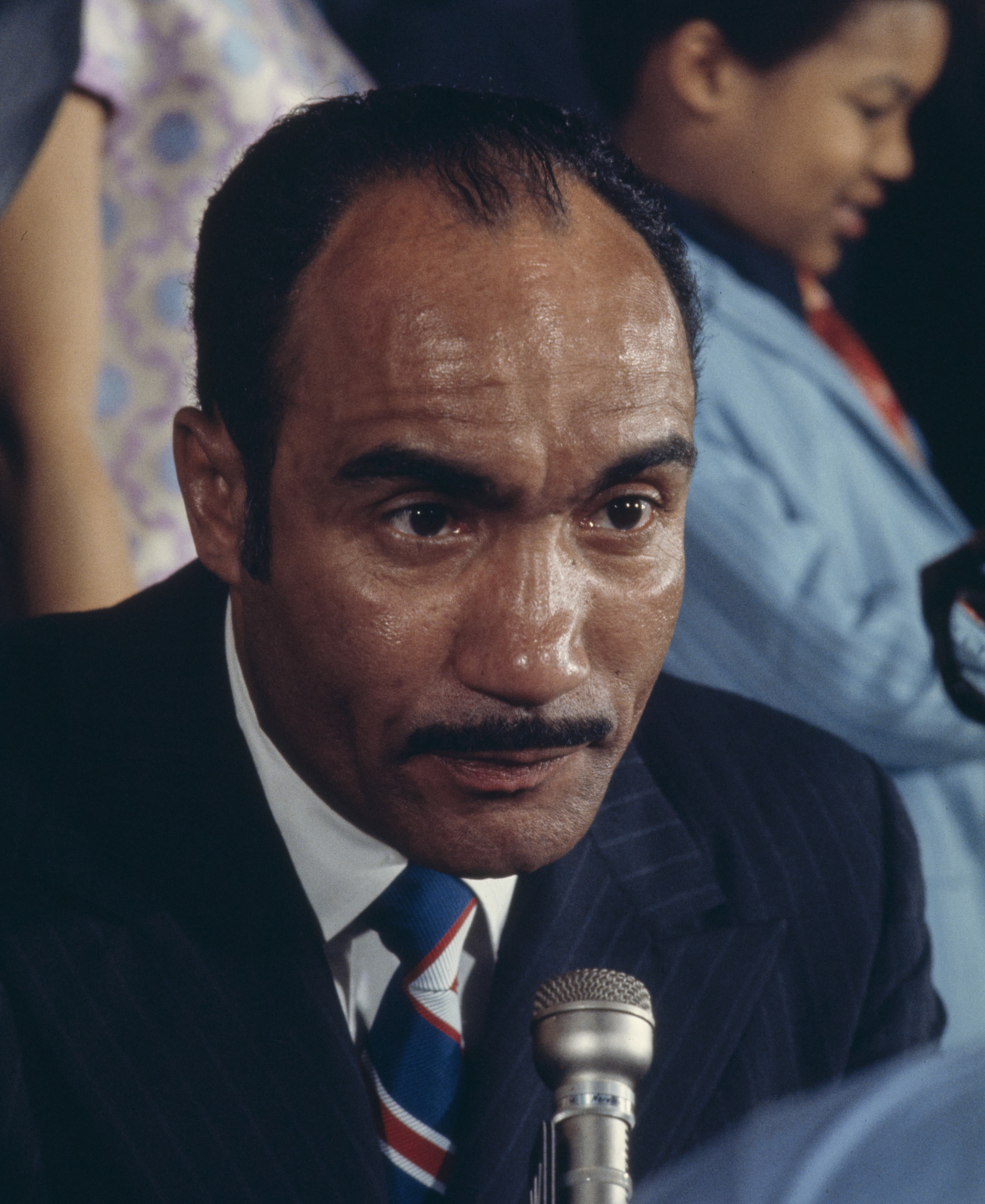
- Paterson in 1970

58th Secretary of State of New York
- In office January 1, 1979 – January 1, 1983
- Governor: Hugh Carey
- Preceded by: Mario Cuomo
- Succeeded by: Gail S. Shaffer

Member of the New York State Senate
- In office January 1, 1966 – December 31, 1970
- Preceded by: Bernard G. Gordon
- Succeeded by: Sidney A. von Luther
- Constituency: 31st district (1966); 27th district (1967–1970)

Deputy Mayor of New York City
- In office March 1978 – January 1, 1979
- Mayor: Ed Koch
- Preceded by: Robert J. Milano
- Succeeded by: Kenneth Lipper

Personal details
- Born: Basil Alexander Paterson; April 27, 1926 New York City, U.S.
- Died: April 16, 2014 (aged 87) New York City, U.S.
- Party: Democratic
- Spouse: Portia Hairston (m. 1953)
- Children: 2, including David
- Education: St. John's University (BS, JD)

Military service
- Allegiance: United States
- Branch/service: United States Army
- Battles/wars: World War II

Basil Alexander Paterson (April 27, 1926 – April 16, 2014) was an American labor lawyer and politician. He served in the New York State Senate from 1966 to 1971 and as the first African-American secretary of state of New York, serving under Governor Hugh Carey from 1979 to 1983. In 1970, Paterson was the Democratic nominee for Lieutenant Governor of New York on the Arthur Goldberg ticket. Paterson's son David served as the state's first African-American governor from 2008 to 2011.

At his death in 2014, The New York Times described Paterson as "one of the old-guard Democratic leaders who for decades dominated politics in Harlem and influenced black political power in New York City and the state into the 21st century,"

== Early life and education ==
Paterson was born in Harlem on April 27, 1926, the son of Leonard James and Evangeline Alicia (Rondon) Paterson. His father was born on the island of Carriacou in the Grenadines and arrived in New York City aboard the S.S. Vestris on May 16, 1917. His mother was born in Kingston, Jamaica and arrived in Philadelphia on September 9, 1919, aboard the S.S. Vestnorge (with a final destination of New York City). A stenographer by profession, she once served as a secretary for Marcus Garvey.

In 1942, at the age of 16, Paterson graduated from De Witt Clinton High School in the Bronx. He was shaped by his early experiences with racism. "I got out of high school when I was 16," Paterson told The New York Times columnist Bob Herbert, "and the first real job I had was with a wholesale house in the old Port Authority building, down on 18th Street. We'd pack and load these trucks that went up and down in huge elevators. Every year there would be a Christmas party for the employees at some local hotel. Those of us who worked in the shipping department were black. We got paid not to go to the party."

Paterson attended college at St. John's University, but his studies were interrupted by a two-year stint in the U.S. Army during World War II. After serving honorably, he returned to St. John's to complete his undergraduate studies. While there, he was active in social and community service organizations including the Kappa Alpha Psi fraternity—where he joined the ranks of the Omicron chapter of New York (now at Columbia University) in 1947. Paterson graduated with a B.S. degree in biology in 1948. He was later admitted to St. John's University Law School, where he received a Juris Doctor degree in 1951.

== Political career ==
=== 'Harlem Clubhouse' ===
Paterson became involved in Democratic politics in Harlem in the 1950s. He was elected head of the NAACP in 1964, which was widely recognized as the prelude to a political career. Along with former Mayor David Dinkins, Manhattan Borough President Percy Sutton, and Congressman Charles Rangel, he was a leader of the influential Gang of Four (also known as the "Harlem Clubhouse") in the 1960s. Their influence waned in the 1990s, as blacks left Harlem.

=== New York State Senate ===
Paterson was elected to the New York State Senate in 1966 and represented the Upper West Side and Harlem in the 176th, 177th and 178th New York State Legislatures. While in office, he played a key role in preventing Columbia University from building a gym in Morningside Park. In the Senate he supported special education, reform of the state's divorce laws and other progressive measures. He also was an early supporter of liberalized abortion laws despite his Catholic faith.

=== Lieutenant governor campaign ===
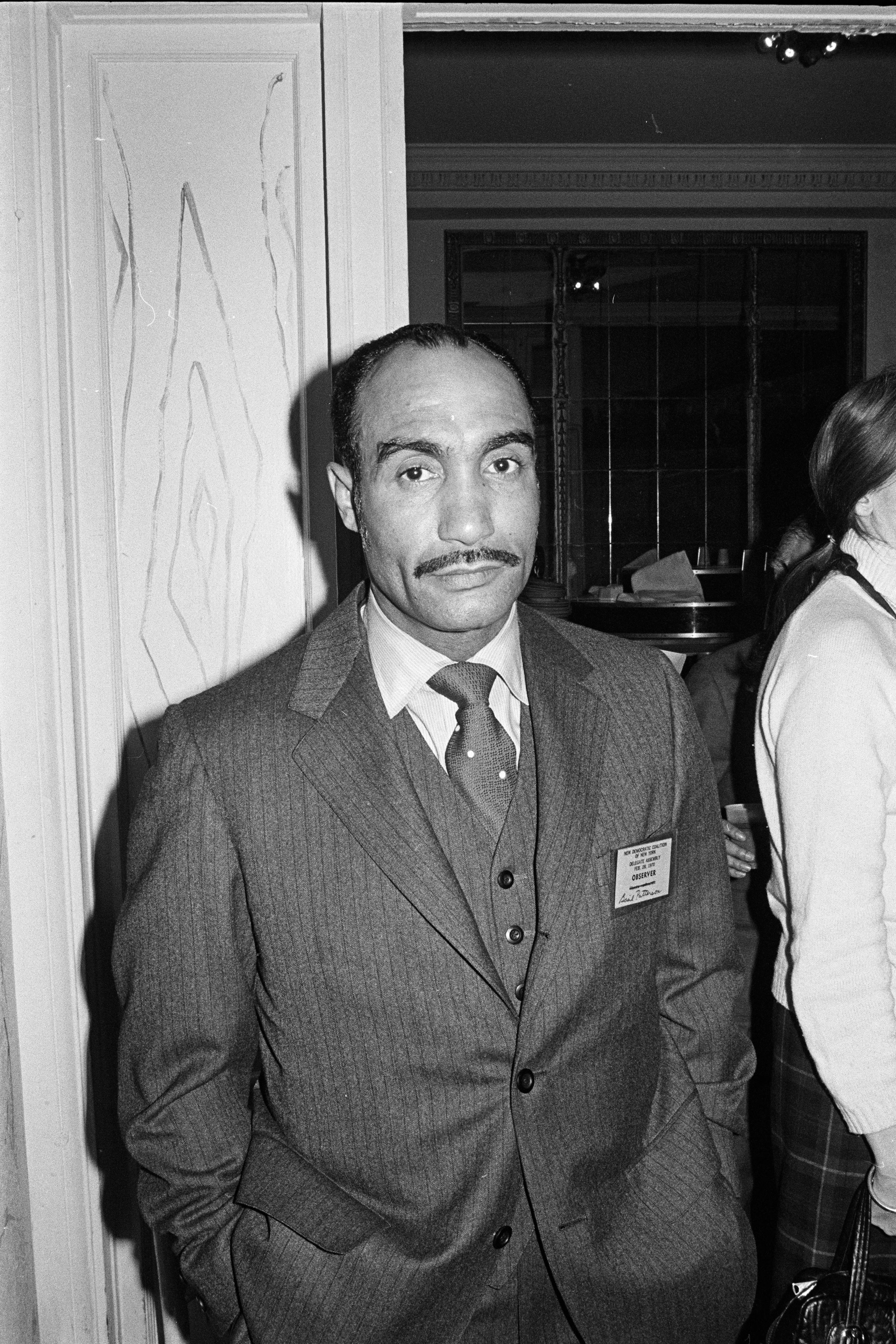
Paterson at the New Democratic Coalition Convention at the Hotel Diplomat in New York City, February 28, 1970

In 1970, Paterson vacated his senate seat to run for Lieutenant Governor of New York alongside former U.S. Supreme Court Justice Arthur Goldberg. In the primary, Paterson received 100,000 more votes than his ticket mate, who ran a close race against Howard Samuels. During the election, Albany machine boss Daniel P. O'Connell stated "He's the only white man on the ticket."

Paterson (right) with Arthur Goldberg during their campaign, 1970

The Goldberg/Paterson ticket ultimately lost to Republican incumbents Gov. Nelson Rockefeller and Lt. Gov. Malcolm Wilson. Paterson was passed over for the 1974 governor's race even though he was the highest vote-getter in 1970. His son, David Paterson, would go on to become lieutenant governor in 2007.

=== Appointments ===
In 1972, Paterson was the first elected African American Vice Chairman of the Democratic National Committee.

In 1978, Paterson was appointed Deputy Mayor of New York City by Ed Koch. He stepped down from that post in 1979 to become Secretary of State of New York in Governor Hugh Carey's administration. Paterson was the first African-American to hold the post, and he served until 1983.

As Koch prepared to seek a third term in 1985, Paterson explored a mayoral candidacy of his own but ultimately chose not to run. He cited "pressing family problems" in declining to run for mayor.

Mario Cuomo appointed Paterson to the board of the Port Authority of New York and New Jersey in 1989. He served from 1989 to 1995. Andrew Cuomo appointed Paterson to the Board of the Port Authority of New York and New Jersey in 2013.

Paterson chaired the New York City Mayor's Judiciary Committee for four years and the New York State Governor's Judicial Screening Panel for the Second Department for eight years. He ended his tenure at the Commission on Judicial Nominations after serving for twelve years. Paterson was appointed by Mario Cuomo to the State Committee's and Michael Bloomberg to the city's Judiciary Committee.

== Involvement in son's political career ==
Paterson's son David was the 55th Governor of New York. Prior to his tenure as Governor, his son served in the state Senate from 1985 to 2006. David ran for the Senate at the behest of Percy Sutton, after the death of the incumbent, Leon Bogues. David rose to the post of state senate minority leader from 2003 to 2006. He was subsequently elected lieutenant governor in 2006 on a ticket with Gov. Eliot Spitzer. David Paterson succeeded to the governor's office upon Spitzer's resignation on March 17, 2008. Basil was present at his son's swearing in and was recognized by his son during his speech.

Paterson was ambivalent about David's political career due to his blindness. For years he kept his distance from David's political career to avoid conflicts of interest, especially after David became lieutenant governor in 2006.

However, according to the New York Times, over time he became David's "closest confidant after the new governor became entangled in controversies, including domestic abuse charges against a senior aide and perjury accusations in an ethics case involving Yankees tickets." The younger Paterson decided not to run for reelection in 2010, and watching the controversies unfold was difficult for his father to watch.

== Personal life and death ==
Paterson was Catholic. Outside of public service, he was a member of Meyer, Suozzi, English & Klein, P.C. and co-chaired the firm's labor law practice.

He died at Mount Sinai Hospital in Manhattan on April 16, 2014, at the age of 87. He was survived by his wife Portia Hairston, whom he married in 1953, by his sons David and Daniel, and five grandchildren.

== See also ==
- 1970 New York gubernatorial election
- 1970 New York state election

New York State Senate
Preceded by Bernard G. Gordon	New York State Senate; 31st District; 1966	Succeeded by Ivan Warner
Preceded by Paul P. E. Bookson	New York State Senate; 27th District; 1967–1971	Succeeded by Sidney A. von Luther
Party political offices
Preceded by Howard J. Samuels	Democratic nominee for Lieutenant Governor of New York; 1970	Succeeded by Mary Anne Krupsak
Preceded by Donald S. Harrington	Liberal nominee for Lieutenant Governor of New York; 1970	Succeeded by Mary Anne Krupsak
Political offices
Preceded by Mario Cuomo	Secretary of State of New York; 1979–1983	Succeeded by Gail Shaffer
