= Frank C. Moore (politician) =

American politician

Frank Moore
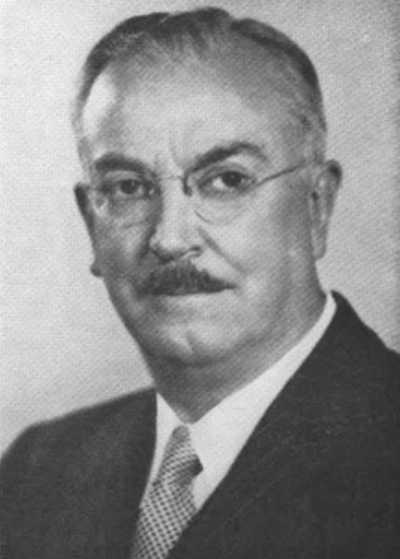

Lieutenant Governor of New York
- In office January 1, 1951 – September 30, 1953
- Governor: Thomas E. Dewey
- Preceded by: Joe R. Hanley
- Succeeded by: Arthur H. Wicks (acting)

48th Comptroller of New York
- In office January 1, 1943 – December 31, 1950
- Governor: Thomas E. Dewey
- Preceded by: Joseph V. O'Leary
- Succeeded by: J. Raymond McGovern

Personal details
- Born: Frank Charles Moore; March 23, 1896 Toronto, Ontario, Canada
- Died: April 23, 1978 (aged 82) Crystal River, Florida, U.S.
- Party: Republican
- Education: University at Buffalo (LL.B)

Military service
- Branch/service: Royal Canadian Air Force; Royal Air Force; United States Army
- Battles/wars: World War I

Frank Charles Moore (March 23, 1896 – April 23, 1978) was a Canadian-born American lawyer and politician who served as the 48th New York State Comptroller.

== Early life and education ==
Moore was born in Toronto, Ontario, in 1896. When he was 11 months old, his parents moved to Buffalo, New York, where he was raised. Moore attended Hobart College and earned a law degree from the University at Buffalo Law School.

=== Military service ===
During World War I, Moore served in the Royal Canadian Air Force, Royal Flying Corps and United States Army. He was discharged in 1917 for being underweight.

== Career ==
Moore was a delegate to the New York State Constitutional Conventions of 1938 and 1967. He was the New York State Comptroller from 1943 to 1950, elected in 1942 and 1946.

At the 1950 New York state election, he was elected Lieutenant Governor of New York and took office on January 1, 1951. He resigned on September 30, 1953, to become president of Nelson A. Rockefeller's Government Affairs Foundation.

Moore held numerous board and panel positions, including serving as the Chairman of the Committee on Constitutional Tax and Debt Limitations and City-School Fiscal Relations (CTDL-CSFR). Chairman of the Finance Subcommittee, White House Conference on Education, and Chair of the State University of New York Board of Trustees from 1953 to 1965.

== Death ==
Moore died on April 23, 1978, in Crystal River, Florida. He was buried at Elmlawn Cemetery in Kenmore, New York.

== General Reference ==
- Frank C. Moore Papers 1881-1978 (APAP-223). M. E. Grenander Department of Special Collections and Archives, University Libraries, University at Albany, State University of New York (hereafter referred to as the Moore Papers).

== Sources ==
- Moore, E to F at Political Graveyard
- His resignation announced, in Time magazine on May 4, 1953.

Party political offices
Preceded by Julius Rothstein	Republican nominee for New York State Comptroller; 1942, 1946	Succeeded by J. Raymond McGovern
Preceded by Joe R. Hanley	Republican nominee for Lieutenant Governor of New York; 1950	Succeeded by J. Raymond McGovern
Political offices
Preceded by Joseph V. O'Leary	New York State Comptroller; 1943–1950	Succeeded by J. Raymond McGovern
Preceded by Joe R. Hanley	Lieutenant Governor of New York; 1951–1953	Succeeded by Arthur H. Wicks; Acting
