= Clifton DeBerry =

American politician (1923–2006)

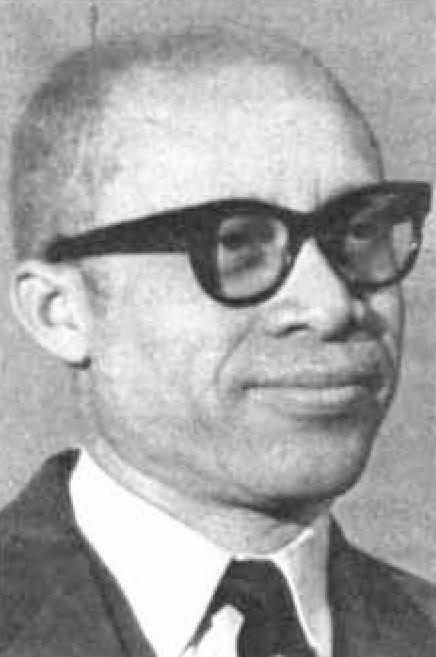
Clifton DeBerry, two-time presidential candidate of the Socialist Workers Party.

Clifton DeBerry (September 18, 1923 – March 24, 2006) was an American communist and two-time candidate for President of the United States of the Socialist Workers Party. He was the first black American in the 20th century to be chosen by a political party as its nominee for president.

== Biography ==
=== Early years ===
Clifton DeBerry was born in September 1923 in Holly Springs, Mississippi. He worked as a house painter and was a trade unionist.

In the 1940s, DeBerry left his native South and moved to Chicago, where he worked in a factory owned by International Harvester. He became active in the Farm Equipment Workers Union and joined the Communist Party. DeBerry grew critical of the official Communist movement, and in 1953 he joined the Socialist Workers Party, a Trotskyist organization.

During his Chicago years in the late 1950s, DeBerry found it hard to keep a job. "I would get a job and it would last only 3 days. I would go from one job to another. The FBI would visit my boss and I would be fired." DeBerry gave up on the city and moved to New York in 1960. DeBerry married Carol Dobbs, daughter of SWP national secretary Farrell Dobbs.

=== Political career ===
DeBerry's career as a political activist began in earnest in the 1950s. In 1955 he helped organize a mass protest in Chicago to protest the lynching of Emmett Till back home in his native Mississippi. DeBerry spoke out in defense of the Cuban Revolution, in support of African liberation struggles, and demanded withdrawal of U.S. troops from Vietnam.

DeBerry marched for civil rights in Selma, Alabama and Memphis, Tennessee and was a supporter of Malcolm X in the 1960s. He was a delegate to the founding conventions of the Negro Labor Congress and the Negro American Labor Council.

In November 1963, DeBerry ran for councilman in the Brooklyn borough of New York City. He received 3,514 votes in the race.

DeBerry was the Socialist Workers Party's candidate in the 1964 election. He was the party's first African American candidate as well as the first African American candidate for president of any existing party (he was preceded in 1960 by marginal candidate Clennon King). DeBerry's running mate was Ed Shaw, a printer from Illinois.

In the 1965 city election, DeBerry was the SWP's candidate for Mayor of New York.

In 1970, he ran for Governor of New York and polled 5,766 votes.

DeBerry ran again in the 1980 United States presidential election as one of three candidates the party had that year, the others being Andrew Pulley and Richard Congress. Matilde Zimmermann was the vice presidential candidate on all three tickets.

=== Death and legacy ===
Clifton DeBerry died of heart failure on March 24, 2006 in a hospital near his home of Union City, California. He was 82 years old. A memorial meeting was held in his honor by the Socialist Workers Party in New York City on April 29, 2006.

== Works by Clifton DeBerry ==
- Marxism and the Negro Struggle. With Harold Cruse and George Breitman. New York: Pathfinder Press, 1965.
- The Case for an Independent Black Political Party [with] American Politics and the 1968 Presidential Campaign, by Jack Barnes. New York: Socialist Workers Party, 1967.
- Murder in Memphis. Martin Luther King and the future of the Black Liberation Struggle. With Paul Boutelle, George Novack, and Joseph Hansen. New York: Merit Publishers, 1968.
- "Report on Black Struggle," in May 1968 Plenum Material. New York: Socialist Workers Party, 1968.

Party political offices
| Preceded by Farrell Dobbs | Socialist Workers Party nominee for President of the United States; 1964 | Succeeded by Fred Halstead |
| Preceded by Peter Camejo | Socialist Workers Party nominee for President of the United States; 1980 | Succeeded by Melvin T. Mason |
