= Paul Boutelle =

American politician (1934–2016)

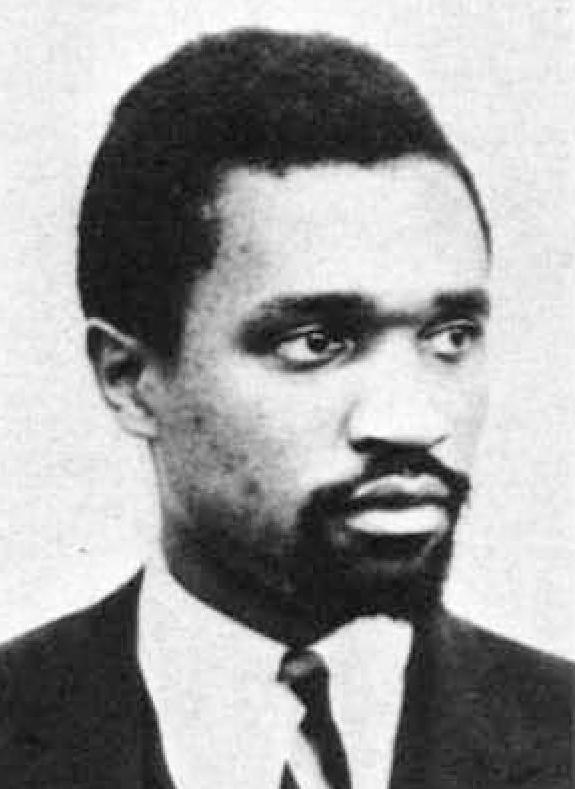
Boutelle while running for Vice President in 1968

Kwame Montsho Ajamu Somburu (born Paul Benjamin Boutelle; October 13, 1934 – May 3, 2016) was an activist, politician, black nationalist, and member of the Socialist Workers Party. In 1979, he changed his name to Kwame Montsho Ajamu Somburu.

== Activism ==
Boutelle campaigned as a socialist candidate for Mayor of New York City, Mayor of Oakland, California, United States Congress three times, New York State Attorney General in 1966, and Borough President of Manhattan. Boutelle was also active in the Freedom Now Party (an all-Black party that existed from 1963 to 1965) and was its candidate for the New York State Senate in Harlem, New York City in 1964.

In December 1965, Boutelle organized the Afro-Americans Against the War in Vietnam (AAAWV) group. Boutelle was the first chairman of the AAAWV and a secretary of the Black United Action Front, both instrumental in organizing the Harlem portions of the April 15, 1967 New York City march staged by the Spring Mobilization Committee to End the War in Vietnam. Boutelle appears in the 1968 film, No Vietnamese Ever Called Me Nigger, photographed by Michael Wadleigh and directed by fellow Socialist Workers Party member David Loeb Weiss.

== Vice-Presidential Candidate (1968) ==
Boutelle was the Socialist Workers Party candidate for U.S. Vice President in 1968. He and presidential candidate Fred Halstead were on the ballot in 19 states. Boutelle toured throughout the United States during that campaign and appeared on numerous radio and television shows, including William F. Buckley, Jr.'s Firing Line (episode 111, taped on July 10, 1968), and in interviews with Joey Bishop and Dick Cavett. He spoke at numerous community meetings, universities, forums, conferences, and other venues.

Boutelle also toured internationally during the 1968 campaign to Canada, England, Scotland, and France. His national tour of France was cancelled because of the nationwide worker and student strikes and protests during the spring of 1968. His sponsoring organization was one of 22 banned by the French government.

On July 10, 1968, Boutelle appeared on the political talk show Firing Line.

== Bibliography ==
- (1969). "2 Socialist Parties File For Mayoralty." The New York Times. September 5.
- Alexander, Robert (1991). International Trotskyism, 1929-1985: A Documented Analysis of the Movement. Durham, NC: Duke University Press.
- Jones, Charles E., ed (1998). The Black Panther Party (Reconsidered). Baltimore: Black Classics Press.
- (1967). "Socialist Workers Party Names Antiwar Slate for '68 Election." The New York Times. August 31.
