= Donald S. Harrington =

American priest (1914–2005)

Donald Szantho Harrington (July 11, 1914 in Newton, Middlesex County, Massachusetts – September 16, 2005 in Romania) was an American politician and religious leader.

== Education ==
Harrington graduated from the University of Chicago in 1939, and began preaching at the People's Liberal Church on Chicago's South Side.

== Career ==
Harrington became a socialist while at Antioch College and joined the Socialist Party of America in 1934. He was a member of the American Peace Mobilization and opposed the United States joining World War II. He became an anti-communist after the APM became interventionist after Operation Barbarossa.

Harrington was inspired by John Haynes Holmes and became a minister of the Community Church of the New York Unitarian Universalist in New York City in 1944. He replaced Holmes as senior minister in 1949. Harrington retired as senior minister in 1982.

Harrington became the chair of the Liberal Party of New York in 1965, being the "face" of the party which was ruled with an iron fist by Alex Rose until 1976. Harrington was a supporter of the Fair Play for Cuba Committee.

In the New York state election, 1966, Harrington ran for Lieutenant Governor of New York on the Liberal ticket with Franklin D. Roosevelt, Jr. They were defeated by the incumbent Republicans Nelson Rockefeller and Malcolm Wilson, but Harrington was elected a delegate to the New York State Constitutional Convention of 1967. A past president of United World Federalists, Harrington wrote Religion in an Age of Science in 1965.

== Personal life ==
In 1939, Harrington married fellow seminary student Vilma Szantho (d. 1982). They had two children: Loni Hancock and David Harrington. In 1984, he married his first wife's niece, Anika Szantho, who was ordained a Unitarian minister in 1990. They lived in Transylvania where Harrington was active in economic development and his wife served several village congregations. He made his wife's maiden name his middle name.

Harrington died from complications of a gall bladder surgery, done in spring 2005, from which he never fully recovered.

== Works cited ==
- Soyer, Daniel (2021). Left in the Center: The Liberal Party of New York and the Rise and Fall of American Social Democracy. Cornell University Press. ISBN 9781501759888. JSTOR 10.7591/j.ctv1hw3x50.2.

Party political offices
Preceded by John J. Burns	Liberal Party Nominee for Lieutenant Governor of New York; 1966	Succeeded by Basil Paterson
