= Malcolm Wilson (politician) =

Governor of New York from 1973 to 1974

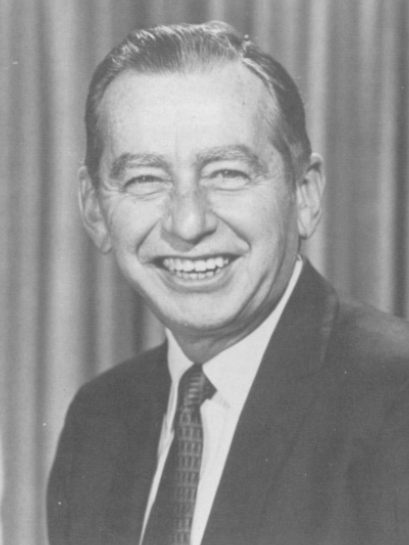

50th Governor of New York
- In office December 18, 1973 – December 31, 1974
- Lieutenant: Warren M. Anderson (acting)
- Preceded by: Nelson Rockefeller
- Succeeded by: Hugh Carey

Lieutenant Governor of New York
- In office January 1, 1959 – December 18, 1973
- Governor: Nelson Rockefeller
- Preceded by: George DeLuca
- Succeeded by: Warren M. Anderson (acting)

6th Chair of the National Lieutenant Governors Association
- In office 1967–1968
- Preceded by: Harry Lee Waterfield
- Succeeded by: John Cherberg

Member of the New York State Assembly from the Westchester County 1st district
- In office January 1, 1945 – December 31, 1958
- Preceded by: Christopher H. Lawrence
- Succeeded by: Christian H. Armbruster

Member of the New York State Assembly from the Westchester County 5th district
- In office January 1, 1939 – December 31, 1944
- Preceded by: Arthur J. Doran
- Succeeded by: Christopher H. Lawrence

Personal details
- Born: Charles Malcolm Wilson; February 26, 1914 New York City, US
- Died: March 13, 2000 (aged 86) New Rochelle, New York, US
- Resting place: Gate of Heaven Cemetery; Hawthorne, New York
- Party: Republican
- Spouse: Katherine McCloskey
- Children: 2
- Education: Fordham University (AB, LLB)
- Profession: Lawyer

Military service
- Allegiance: United States
- Branch/service: United States Navy
- Years of service: 1943–1945
- Rank: Lieutenant (Junior Grade)
- Battles/wars: World War II

Charles Malcolm Wilson (February 26, 1914 – March 13, 2000) was an American politician who served as the 50th governor of New York from December 18, 1973, to December 31, 1974. He was a member of the New York State Assembly from 1939 to 1958. He also served in the Navy during World War II. In 1958, he was elected the lieutenant governor of New York on the gubernatorial ticket with Nelson Rockefeller, and when they won he served as lieutenant governor until succeeding to the governorship after Rockefeller resigned. Wilson lost the 1974 gubernatorial election to Hugh Carey.

In 1994, the original Tappan Zee Bridge was renamed in Wilson's honor. There is also a park in Yonkers, New York named for him.

== Early life ==
Wilson was born in New York City, one of four children born to patent attorney Charles H. Wilson and Agnes (Egan) Wilson. The Wilsons were a Roman Catholic family of Irish and Scottish extraction. Charles H. Wilson, was an unsuccessful Republican candidate for the New York State Assembly in 1912. Agnes Wilson was a Republican activist and local party leader. The family moved to Yonkers, New York, when Wilson was eight, and Wilson continued to reside there after he began his career.

=== Education and professional career ===
Wilson attended Manhattan's St. Thomas Academy and the Elizabeth Seton Academy in White Plains. He then attended Fordham Preparatory School, from which he graduated in 1929 at age 15. Wilson earned a Bachelor of Arts degree from Fordham University in 1933 at age 19 and a LL.B. from Fordham University School of Law in 1936 at age 22. He was admitted to the bar and joined the White Plains firm that eventually became known as Kent, Hazzard, Jaeger, Greer, Wilson, and Fay. Wilson practiced law at this firm for his entire career, and became a partner in 1946.

== Political career ==
At age 24, just two years after graduating from Fordham Law, Wilson was elected to the New York State Assembly where he represented the 5th district of Westchester County from 1939 to 1945, and after re-districting the 1st district from 1945 to 1959. He sat in the 162nd, 163rd, 164th, 165th, 166th, 167th, 168th, 169th, 170th and 171st New York State Legislatures. During his tenure as a legislator, Wilson sponsored a large number of bills that became law, including the Wilson Pakula Act, which barred candidates from running in a party primary if they were not members of that party, unless party leaders representing a majority of the voters in the jurisdiction granted permission.

Wilson's political and legal careers were interrupted by the outbreak of World War II. He joined the United States Navy as an ensign in June 1943 and trained at the Little Creek, Virginia Armed Guard School. He served as a gun crew commander on Liberty ships, including duty in the British Isles and the Mediterranean, and also took part in the Operation Overlord invasion of Normandy. He was promoted to lieutenant (junior grade) in December 1944 and transferred to the inactive reserve in October 1945. While he was at war, in 1944 Wilson won reelection to the Assembly in absentia.

=== Lieutenant governor of New York 1959–1973 ===
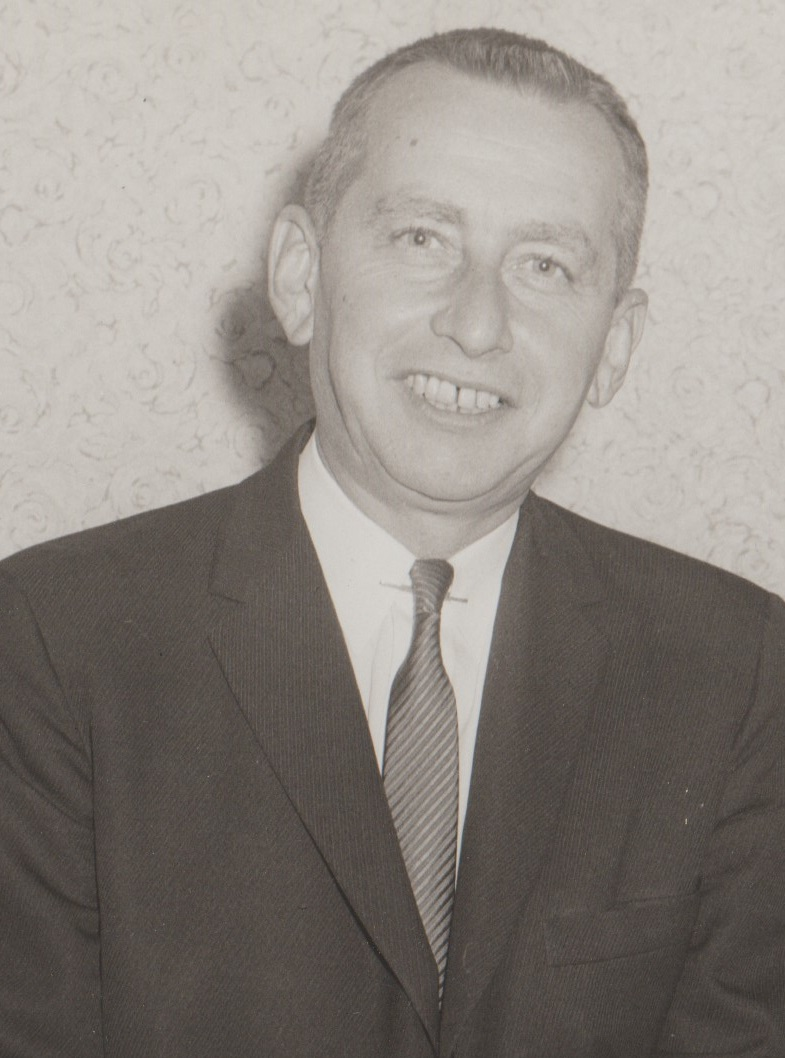
Wilson as lieutenant governor.

In 1958, Wilson decided to support Rockefeller for Governor despite the fact that Rockefeller was new to state politics and had never run for office before. Wilson took pains to introduce Rockefeller to many politically powerful people in the state. They would frequently travel in Wilson's personal car in order to play down the candidate's wealth. Rockefeller was nominated for governor, and Wilson for lieutenant governor.

The Rockefeller-Wilson ticket defeated the incumbent Democrats W. Averell Harriman and George DeLuca. Wilson served as lieutenant governor for nearly 15 years, the entirety of Rockefeller's governorship. The Rockefeller-Wilson ticket was reelected in 1962, 1966 and 1970. Throughout his tenure, he tended to agree with Rockefeller's liberal Republicanism, with the notable exception of abortion, the legalization of which Wilson opposed. Wilson defined himself as "an economic conservative and a human-rights liberal".

=== Governor of New York 1973–1974 ===
In December 1973, Rockefeller resigned as governor to run the Commission on Critical Choices for Americans, and Wilson assumed the governorship. He completed the remaining year of Rockefeller's term. While governor, Wilson worked to improve passenger rail service in the state and under his leadership, New York City-Albany-Montréal and New York City-Buffalo-Detroit service were revived. Concerned that city governments, especially New York City, were financing their budgets with financial sleight-of-hand, Wilson warned New York State's mayors that there would be a reckoning unless they got their fiscal houses in order. His warning turned out to be prescient when New York City was found to be nearly bankrupt, and had to resort to federal assistance to regain a sound footing. But Wilson's concern over government finances turned into a campaign issue for Carey in the 1974 election, when an agency under Wilson's purview, the state's Urban Development Corporation, was discovered to be near bankruptcy. After taking office, Carey accused Wilson of hiding the severity of the crisis, and complained that the Wilson administration had not been helpful or engaged during the transition between governors.

Wilson ran for election to a full term in 1974. The period was a difficult one for the nation, both in terms of economic and foreign policy and for the Republican Party, which was weakened by the Watergate scandal. Democrats swept to power across the nation in the 1974 general election, with Wilson losing to Hugh Carey, by 808,836 votes.

== Later life and death ==
After losing the election, Wilson returned to his legal practice and served as Chairman of the Board and CEO of the Manhattan Savings Bank from 1977 until 1986.

Wilson's wife, Katherine, (née McCloskey) died in 1980. In 1991 Wilson's health deteriorated and he retired to New Rochelle, New York.

Wilson died in New Rochelle on March 13, 2000. His memorial service was held at Holy Family Church in New Rochelle. He was buried at Gate of Heaven Cemetery in Hawthorne, New York.

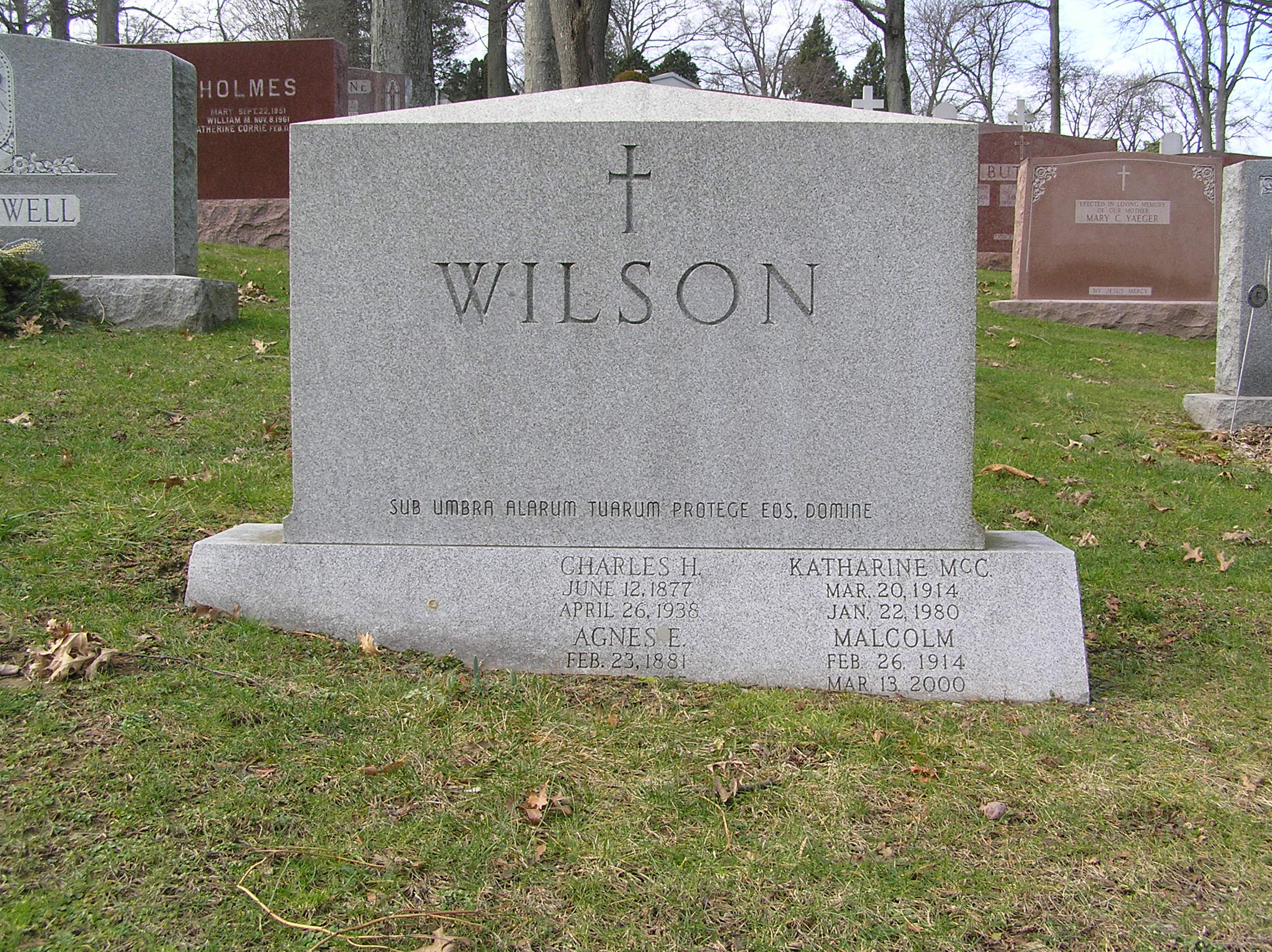
The gravesite of Governor Malcolm Wilson

== Personal life ==
Wilson had two daughters, Katharine, an attorney, and Anne, and six grandsons. Wilson was a Catholic and attended the St. Denis Catholic Church in Yonkers, New York.

== General Reference ==
- Malcolm Wilson Papers, 1971-1974. M.E. Grenander Department of Special Collections and Archives, University Libraries, University at Albany, State University of New York (hereafter referred to as the Wilson Papers).

Party political offices
Preceded by J. Raymond McGovern	Republican nominee for Lieutenant Governor of New York; 1958, 1962, 1966, 1970	Succeeded by Ralph G. Caso
Preceded by Nelson Rockefeller	Republican nominee for Governor of New York; 1974	Succeeded by Perry B. Duryea Jr.
Preceded by Paul L. Adams	Conservative nominee for Governor of New York; 1974	Succeeded by Perry B. Duryea Jr.
New York State Assembly
Preceded by Arthur J. Doran	Member of the New York State Assembly from the Westchester County 5th district 1939–1945	Succeeded by Christopher H. Lawrence
Preceded by Christopher H. Lawrence	Member of the New York State Assembly from the Westchester County 1st district 1945–1959	Succeeded by Christian H. Armbruster
Political offices
Preceded by George DeLuca	Lieutenant Governor of New York; 1959–1973	Succeeded by Warren M. Anderson; Acting
Preceded by Nelson Rockefeller	Governor of New York; 1973–1974	Succeeded by Hugh Carey
