= Paul A. Freund =

American jurist (1908–1992)

Paul Freund
- Born: February 16, 1908; St. Louis, Missouri, U.S.
- Died: February 5, 1992 (aged 83); Cambridge, Massachusetts, U.S.
- Education: Washington University (BA); Harvard University (LLB, LLM, SJD)
- Awards: Henry J. Friendly Medal (1989)
- Scientific career
- Fields: Constitutional law
- Workplaces: Harvard Law School
- Notable students: Elliot Richardson, Robert Taft, James Lynn, Thomas Eagleton

Paul Abraham Freund (February 16, 1908 – February 5, 1992) was an American legal scholar. He taught for most of his life at Harvard Law School and is known for his writings on the United States Constitution and the Supreme Court of the United States.

== Early life and education ==
Freund was born in St. Louis, Missouri, to parents of German-Jewish descent. He was a graduate of Washington University in St. Louis (1928) and Harvard Law School (1931, 1932). He served as president of the editorial board of the Harvard Law Review and wrote his 1931 thesis on "The Effect of State Statutes on Federal Equity Jurisdiction."

== Career ==
In 1932–1933, Freund served as law clerk for U.S. Supreme Court associate justice Louis Brandeis. He later called this "the most important year in my life. Brandeis set superhuman standards and lived as if each day were his last on earth and every minute counted. He was a moralist. He saw moral issues where others saw expediency."

Freund next served at the United States Treasury, the Reconstruction Finance Corporation, and the Office of the Solicitor General, where he worked on Supreme Court briefs for major New Deal constitutional cases, arguing for a relatively flexible interpretation of the Constitution in economic and social matters.

He joined the faculty of Harvard Law School as lecturer in 1939 and was named professor of law in 1940. His career there of teaching and scholarship was interrupted only by a return to the Solicitor General's office during World War II and a year as visiting professor at Cambridge University. He was named Charles Stebbins Fairchild Professor in 1950, Royall Professor of Law in 1957, and Carl M. Loeb University Professor in 1958. Freund retired from Harvard Law School in 1976.

He was named by President Dwight D. Eisenhower to the position of editor-in-chief of a projected multi-volume history of the Supreme Court and therefore declined an offer from President-elect John F. Kennedy to become Solicitor General of the United States that many believed would have led to his eventual appointment to the Supreme Court. Nevertheless, in 1962 President Kennedy twice considered naming Freund to the Supreme Court for positions ultimately filled by Deputy Attorney General Byron R. White and Secretary of Labor Arthur Goldberg. The Attorney General, Robert F. Kennedy opposed Freund on the basis that he did not like the symbolism of another Harvard faculty member in office, following the appointments of Archibald Cox, McGeorge Bundy, Arthur M. Schlesinger Jr. to serve in the Kennedy administration. Freund was also opposed by Chief Justice Earl Warren.

== Writings ==
Most of Freund's writings were the result of invitations to speak. They have been collected, principally, in three volumes: On Understanding the Supreme Court (1949), The Supreme Court of the United States: Its Business, Purposes and Performance (1961), and On Law and Justice (1968).

== Philosophy ==
Freund believed that the mission of law was "to impose a measure of order upon the disorder of experience without stifling diversity, spontaneity, and disarray."

Freund often cited Lord Acton's dictum, "When you perceive a truth, look for the balancing truth," writing that the great issues that come before the Supreme Court "reflect not so much a clash of right and wrong as a conflict between right and right: effective law enforcement and the integrity of the accused; public order and freedom of speech; freedom of worship and abstention from aiding as well as impeding religion. "The courts," he wrote, "are the substations that transform the high-tension charge of the philosophers into the reduced voltage of a serviceable current."

In the 1970s, Freund delivered a lecture in Birmingham, Alabama on the opinions of Supreme Court Justice Hugo L. Black in the field of religion in the schools. In this paper, Freund said: "Reverence for what we know, humility in the presence of the unknown, awe in the face of the unknowable – these are the pervasive moods of the spirit that transcend religious differences and make of learning itself a spiritual experience. A story of Willard Gibbs, the great Yale scientist, describes him standing before a blackboard on which he had worked out an abstruse equation, tears streaming down his cheeks, and the class staring at the board with the gaze of one who had just seen angels. No court or Constitution stands in the way of that kind of moral and spiritual experience. All that stands in the way is our indifference or inadequacy to meet the challenge."

== Influence ==
When he died, former Harvard Law School Dean James Vorenberg called Freund "the dominant figure of his time in the field of constitutional law."

== Recognition ==
Paul Freund was a member of the American Philosophical Society and the Massachusetts Historical Society and a fellow and past president of the American Academy of Arts and Sciences. He received more than twenty honorary degrees. In 1967, he received the Golden Plate Award of the American Academy of Achievement. In 1975, the National Endowment for the Humanities selected Freund for the Jefferson Lecture, the U.S. federal government's highest honor for achievement in the humanities. Freund's lecture was entitled "Liberty: The Great Disorder of Speech," and was later published in The American Scholar. In October 2006, an exhibit entitled "Balancing the Truth: Paul Freund 1908-1992" at the Harvard Law School Library marked the opening of the Paul A. Freund papers.

== Personal life ==
Paul Freund's parents were Charles Freund and the former Hulda Arenson.

Tributes to Paul Freund's legendary kindliness are legion. Dean Vorenberg once said: "I never knew anyone more considerate than Paul. He was incapable of meanness." Dean Erwin Griswold said: "His tastes were always simple. There was no show or splurge about him. No one ever questioned his motivation or his word. I never heard him speak unkindly about anyone. He never raised his voice, though his speech, in the classroom and in private conversation, was resonant, deliberate, and clearly understood. Yet he was always shy and modest, though in no sense a recluse." Ray Jenkins, a journalist who took his courses as a Nieman Fellow, said: "I never met anyone who studied under Paul Freund who did not speak of it as a spiritual experience."

In the 1950s, Freund shared a house with his law school faculty colleague Ernest J. Brown. During the 1970s, Freund lived in an 11th-floor apartment on the Charles River overlooking Harvard Stadium, where he regularly attended Crimson football games. He attended the monthly "Freund Dinners" arranged by fifteen Fly Club undergraduates at the Ritz, and delivered wisdom and friendship from his position at the big round table. He seemed to enjoy discussing legal and other matters with the occasionally unruly undergraduates present on these occasions.

Freund died of cancer of the sinus on February 5, 1992, at the age of 83. His papers reside in the Harvard Law School's Langdell Hall library.

== See also ==
- John F. Kennedy Supreme Court candidates
- List of law clerks for the fourth seat of the Supreme Court of the United States

== Bibliography ==
- 1982: Felix Frankfurter: Reminiscences and Reflections (Harvard Law School)
- 1977: The Moral Education of the Lawyer (Emory University School of Law)
- 1970: Experimentation with Human Subjects (George Braziller)
- 1968: On Law and Justice (Belknap Press of Harvard University Press)
- 1965: Foreword to John D. Feerick, From Failing Hands: The Story of Presidential Succession (Fordham University Press)
- 1965: Religion and the Public Schools (Harvard University Press/Harvard Graduate School of Education/Oxford University Press) (with Robert Ulich)
- 1965: The Supreme Court in Contemporary Life (Southern Methodist University School of Law)
- 1964: Ethical Aspects of Experimentation with Human Subjects (American Academy of Arts and Sciences) (reprinted, 1969)
- 1961: The Supreme Court of the United States: Its Business, Purposes and Performance (World Publishing Company) (paperback 1967) (reprinted by P. Smith, 1972)
- 1957: The Supreme Court and Fundamental Freedoms (Harvard Law School Association of New Jersey)
- 1952-1953: Constitutional Law: Cases and Other Problems (Little Brown) (subsequent eds. or supplements 1954, 1959, 1961, 1966, 1967, 1969, 1977, 1978, 1980, some with Arthur E. Sutherland or Henry Monaghan)
- 1949: On Understanding the Supreme Court (Little, Brown) (reprinted by Greenwood Press, 1977)
