= Langdell =

Langdell can refer to:

- Christopher Columbus Langdell (1826 – 1906), an American jurist and law academic
- Langdell Professor of Law, a title held by American legal scholar Martha Field at Harvard Law School
- Tim Langdell, who founded the American video game company Edge Games in 1979
- Langdell Hall, a building in the Harvard Law School in Cambridge, Massachusetts, U.S.
