= John F. Kennedy Supreme Court candidates =

Although he was president for less than three years, John F. Kennedy appointed two men to the Supreme Court of the United States: Byron White and Arthur Goldberg. Given the advanced age of Associate Justice Felix Frankfurter at the time of Kennedy's inauguration, speculation abounded over potential Kennedy nominations to the Supreme Court from the start of his presidency.

== Byron White nomination ==
Associate Justice Charles Evans Whittaker retired from the Supreme Court (technically taking senior status) in March 1962 after just over five years on the court, citing exhaustion from the workload. The Whittaker retirement gave Kennedy his first vacancy on the Supreme Court.

Two names initially came up as potential nominees: Judge William H. Hastie of the United States Court of Appeals for the Third Circuit and Harvard Law School Professor Paul A. Freund. United States Attorney General Robert F. Kennedy had recommended Hastie, who would have become the first African-American on the Supreme Court. Robert F. Kennedy said "it would mean so much overseas that we had a Negro on the Supreme Court." However, Hastie was opposed by Chief Justice Earl Warren, who balked because "he's not a liberal and he'll be opposed to all measures we are interested in, and he would be completely unsatisfactory." Associate Justice William O. Douglas also objected to Hastie as the nominee, saying he would be "just one more vote for Frankfurter". In addition, President Kennedy's adviser, Ted Sorensen, opposed Hastie because Kennedy was in the process of considering another African-American, Robert C. Weaver, for a cabinet post (Weaver ultimately became the first United States Secretary of Housing and Urban Development, inviting the charge of reverse racism). Sorensen argued that "the first appointment should be one hailed by all for his judicial mien."

Sorensen recommended Freund as the nominee. However, President Kennedy objected to Freund as the nominee because of Freund's Harvard pedigree (having attended Harvard Law School and having been a professor at Harvard Law School at the time of the Whittaker vacancy), given that there already were a significant number of people connected to Harvard University in the Kennedy administration.

Ultimately, Kennedy selected White, who was a longtime supporter of his and who had been serving as United States Deputy Attorney General. Kennedy formally nominated White to the Supreme Court on April 3, 1962. White was confirmed by the United States Senate just eight days later, on April 11, 1962, in a voice vote.

== Arthur Goldberg nomination ==
After suffering a stroke, Associate Justice Felix Frankfurter retired (technically taking senior status) from the Supreme Court on August 28, 1962, at the age of 79.

There is not much evidence that Kennedy considered any other candidate other than Goldberg for the vacancy. It had been widely reported that Frankfurter's seat was considered a "Jewish seat" on the Supreme Court (prior to Frankfurter, it had been occupied by another Jewish Justice, Benjamin N. Cardozo), meaning that the president felt significant pressure to appoint a Jew to replace Frankfurter. Kennedy nominated Goldberg, who at that time was United States Secretary of Labor, on August 31, 1962. The United States Senate confirmed Goldberg in a voice vote on September 25, 1962.

== Names mentioned ==
Following is a list of individuals who were mentioned in various news accounts and books as having been considered by Kennedy for a Supreme Court appointment: –

=== United States Courts of Appeals ===

- Court of Appeals for the District of Columbia Circuit
  - David L. Bazelon (1909–1993)
  - George Thomas Washington (1908–1971)
- Court of Appeals for the Second Circuit
  - Henry Friendly (1903–1986)
  - Thurgood Marshall (1908–1993) (Nominated by Lyndon B. Johnson and Confirmed)
- Court of Appeals for the Third Circuit
  - William H. Hastie (1904–1976)

=== State Supreme Courts ===
- Stanley H. Fuld (1903–2003) – Judge of the New York Court of Appeals
- Walter V. Schaefer (1904–1986) – Associate Justice of the Supreme Court of Illinois
- Roger J. Traynor (1900–1983) – Associate Justice of the Supreme Court of California

=== Administration officials ===
- Arthur Goldberg (1908–1990) – United States Secretary of Labor (Nominated and Confirmed)
- Byron White (1917–2002) – United States Deputy Attorney General (Nominated and Confirmed)
- Clark Clifford (1906–1998) – Member, President's Intelligence Advisory Board
- Archibald Cox (1912–2004) – Solicitor General of the United States
- Henry H. Fowler (1908–2000) – Under Secretary of the Treasury
- Nicholas Katzenbach (1922–2012) – Assistant Attorney General of the Office of Legal Counsel

=== Other backgrounds ===
- Paul A. Freund (1908–1992) – Professor, Harvard Law School
- Edward H. Levi (1911–2000) – Dean, University of Chicago Law School
- Eugene V. Rostow (1913–2002) – Dean, Yale Law School
- Bethuel M. Webster (1900–1989) – Member of the Permanent Court of Arbitration in The Hague, Netherlands
- Herbert Wechsler (1909–2000) – Lecturer, Columbia Law School

== See also ==
- United States federal judge
- Judicial appointment history for United States federal courts
