= Dorothy Kurgans Goldberg =

American writer (1908–1988)

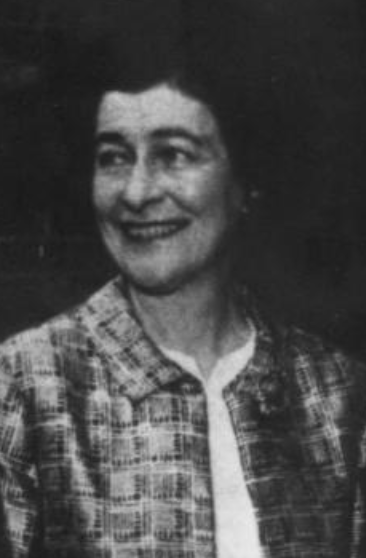
- Dorothy Kurgans Goldberg, from a 1966 publication of the US Department of State
- Born: Dorothy Kurgans; August 1, 1908; St. Louis, Missouri, U.S.
- Died: February 13, 1988 (aged 79); New York City, U.S.
- Occupations: Writer; artist; human rights worker
- Spouse: Arthur Goldberg

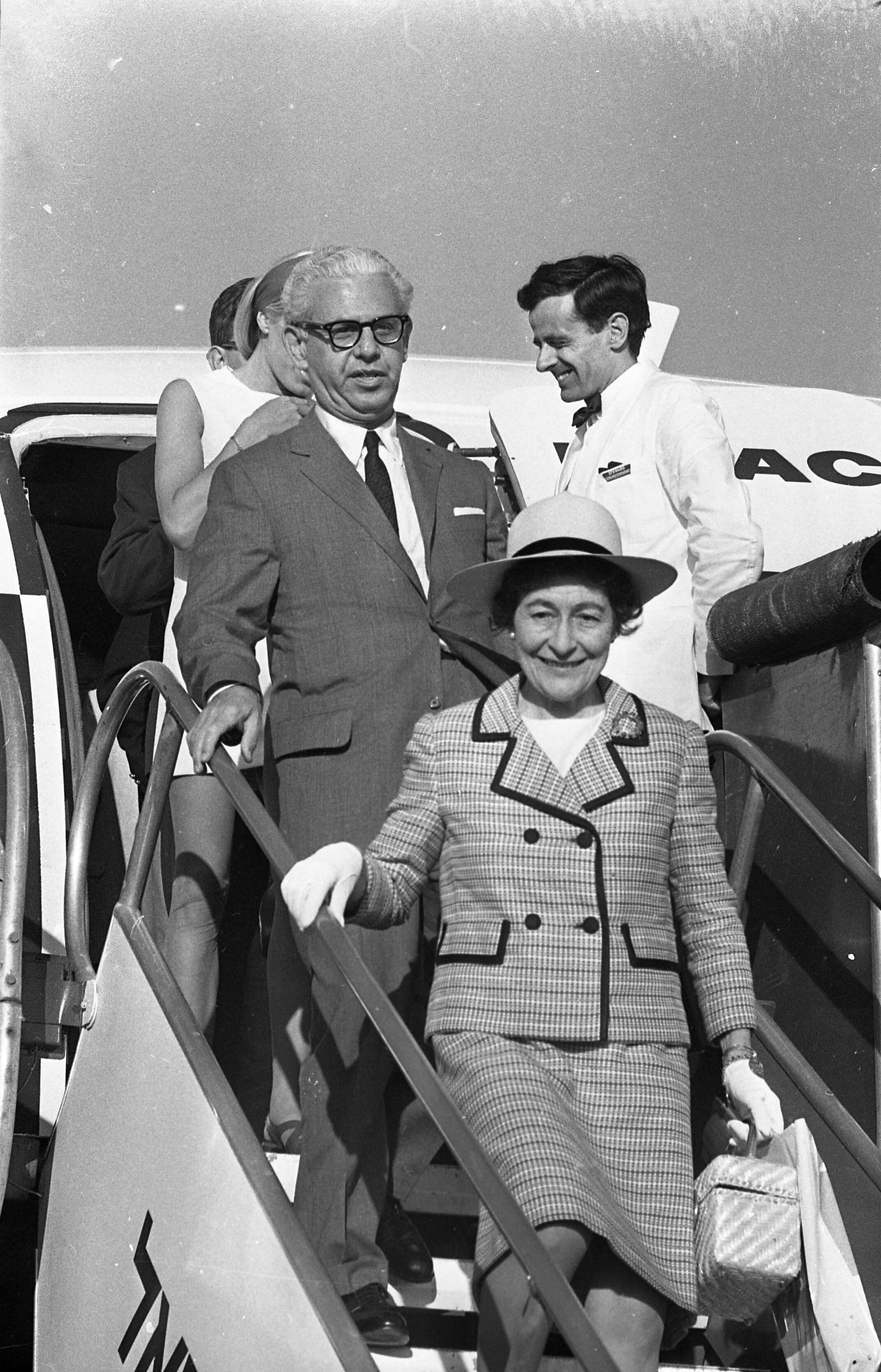
Dorothy Kurgans Goldberg with Arthur Goldberg, 1969

Dorothy Kurgans Goldberg (August 1, 1908 – February 13, 1988) was an American artist and writer.

== Early life and education ==
Dorothy Kurgans was born in St. Louis, Missouri, the daughter of Louis and Esther Feldman Kurgans. Her father was in the garment industry. She studied art and art education at the University of Chicago and the Art Institute of Chicago, and completed doctoral studies at the University of Chicago in 1932.

== Career ==
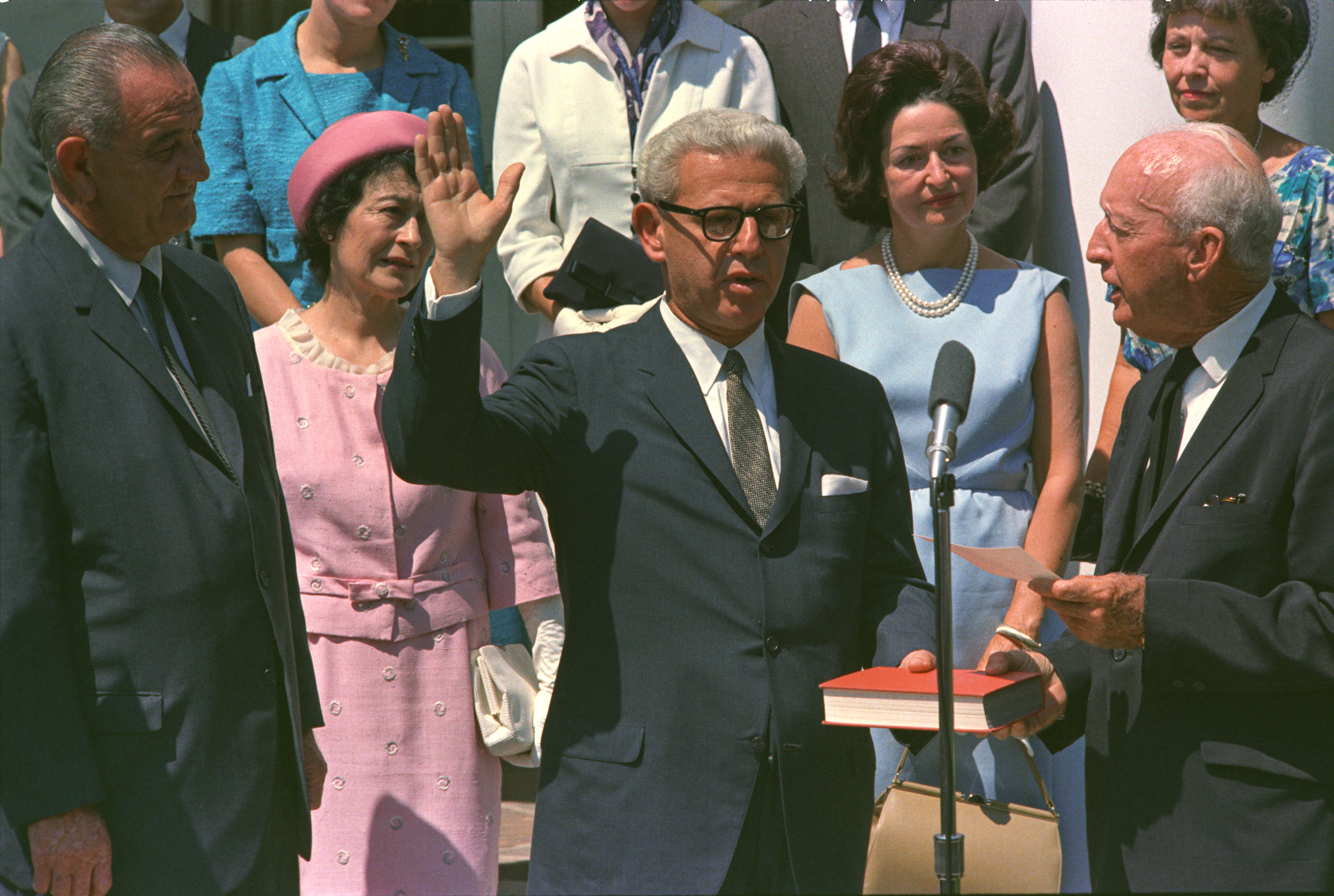
Dorothy Kurgans Goldberg (in pink) stood next to President Lyndon Johnson and behind her husband, Arthur Goldberg, when he was sworn in as United States Ambassador to the United Nations in 1965; also in the photograph are Lady Bird Johnson (in a blue dress) and Supreme Court Justice Hugo Black (on the right)

Goldberg exhibited her paintings, taught art, co-founded the Associated Artists Gallery in Washington, D.C., and supported community art programs in New York and Washington. While her husband was ambassador to the United Nations, she chose the art they displayed in the twelve-story United States Mission headquarters in New York. Books by Goldberg included The Creative Woman (1963), A Private View of Public Life (a memoir, 1975), Lola and the Moving Stairs (a children's book), and Sculpture in the Round (1989, poems, published posthumously).

In 1944, Goldberg testified before a congressional hearing on employment discrimination, representing the National Women's Trade Union League. While based in Washington, D.C., she founded an employment program, Widening Horizons, helped organize DC Citizens for Public Education, and was a founder of Friends of the Juvenile Court. She co-chaired the National School Volunteer Program, was co-founder of the Counselor Aide Program in DC schools, and served several terms on the President's Committee for the Handicapped. In 1970, she campaigned for her husband in his run for governor of New York.

On the international level, Goldberg represented the United States at the Belgrade Conference on Security and Cooperation in Europe, and she was an observer at the Ottawa Conference on Human Rights. She received the Mary McLeod Bethune Award in 1966, from the National Council of Negro Women.

== Personal life and legacy ==
In 1931, Dorothy Kurgans married lawyer Arthur J. Goldberg, who during their long marriage became Secretary of Labor in the Kennedy administration, an ambassador during the Johnson administration, ran for governor of New York in 1970, and served as a justice on the Supreme Court. They had two children, Barbara and Robert. Goldberg died from lung cancer in 1988, aged 79 years, in New York.

A Virginia gallery held an exhibition of Goldberg's paintings in 2001.
