= Clayton Sam White =

American physician and nuclear physicist (1912–2004)

Sam White
- Born: Clayton Samuel White; October 11, 1912; Fort Collins, Colorado, U.S.
- Died: April 26, 2004 (aged 91); Albuquerque, New Mexico, U.S.
- Other name: Clayton Samuel
- Education: University of Colorado Boulder; Hertford College, Oxford; University of Colorado School of Medicine
- Occupations: Physician, researcher
- Known for: Research on effects of nuclear bombs Developing the field of blast and shock biology Discovery of air emboli as a cause of death in blast injury
- Spouse: Margaret Reeve (m. 1941)
- Children: 3
- Relatives: Byron R. White (brother)

Clayton "Sam" Samuel White (October 11, 1912 – April 26, 2004) was an American physician, nuclear physicist, and medical researcher best known for developing the field of "blast and shock biology" which explored the effects of blast and shock waves from atomic bombs and other explosions. By bringing together the disciplines of mathematics, physics, biology, and anatomy, White measured the impact of atomic weapons on physical structures and the human body.

His studies, many of which were conducted at above-ground nuclear weapons tests at the Nevada Test Site, paved the way for precision bombing in support of troops in the field and helped determine how to build adequate bomb shelters and treat blast victims.

White studied the biological effects of inhaling small fission particles produced by nuclear tests in a related field. He also examined, with "remarkable prescience," the environmental impact of consumer aerosol products on the atmosphere and the health risks of inhaling man-made fibers, diesel exhaust, and other substances.

Another area of White's focus was the physiological effect of the high atmosphere on the human body. His research in aviation medicine contributed significantly to the exhaustive physiological and psychological tests conducted in 1959 on the thirty-two candidates competing to become the Mercury Seven astronauts, as depicted in the book and film The Right Stuff.

White's younger brother, Byron Raymond White, served as an associate justice of the United States Supreme Court from 1962 to 1993 and as Deputy Attorney General under John F. Kennedy.

== Early life and education ==
Clayton Samuel White, known as "Sam," was born in Fort Collins, Colorado, in 1912 to Alpha Albert White, a sheep ranch hand and lumberyard manager, and Maude Elizabeth Burger. He was raised in Wellington, Colorado, then a hamlet of 550 residents. His first job, in grade school, was picking sugar beets for $1.50 a day. In high school, during the Great Depression, he and his brother worked the fields after school and on weekends.

Though neither of White's parents attended school beyond sixth grade, they instilled the values of education and hard work in their sons. White was a star student and athlete at Wellington High School and valedictorian of his 1930 graduating class. White accepted an academic scholarship to the University of Colorado where he majored in psychology with minors in physics and mathematics. He was president of the student body, played basketball, earned all-conference honors as a football end, and graduated Phi Beta Kappa in 1934.

After graduation, White began pre-med graduate courses while working in a medical lab to earn money for medical school. In 1935, he was awarded a Rhodes Scholarship and left for England on his first trip outside his home state of Colorado. Until 2006, Sam White and Byron White, a Rhodes pick in 1938, were the only siblings to be selected as Rhodes Scholars.

White captained the Oxford lacrosse team and, in 1938, earned a doctoral degree in physiology before returning to the University of Colorado to start medical school. As a student, he began publishing scientific papers. One, the effects of botulism on the nervous system, sparked a lifelong interest in neurology.

== Military service ==
The day after the attack on Pearl Harbor, White enlisted in the Navy. He completed medical school in Colorado as a naval reserve officer and, in 1942, was assigned to Alameda Naval Air Station in Alameda, California. Shortly after, he was sent to the Naval Air Station Pensacola in Pensacola, Florida, where he enrolled in courses in aviation medicine and flight training at the U.S. Naval School of Aviation Medicine. He was designated a flight surgeon in 1944.

At Pensacola, and, later, Patuxent River Naval Air Station in Maryland, White specialized in aviation medicine and respiratory physiology. His groundbreaking work on oxygen masks and liquid oxygen converters attracted the attention of William Randolph Lovelace II, a Harvard and Mayo Clinic-trained surgeon and highly decorated Air Force pilot who, in World War II, performed daring parachute jumps at high altitudes to test the military's oxygen masks.

Lovelace was eager to learn why some masks would freeze up, sometimes causing fatalities, and sought White's help. White discovered that ice formed in the oxygen inlet ports of the masks and specified modifications to alter them. After the war, Lovelace established a medical research foundation at the Lovelace Clinic in Albuquerque, New Mexico, and recruited White to head it.

== Medical career ==
In 1947, upon completion of his military service, White moved to Albuquerque as director of research at the Lovelace Foundation for Medical Education and Research, which became "world-renowned in terms of research and teaching."

Much of White's early work at Lovelace depended on the research apparatus he built himself. To make the equipment for conducting isotope scans of the thyroid, he took a night course in machine tooling at the University of New Mexico. He bought lead from local junk dealers to construct the apparatus he needed. To create thermostats for his lab, he learned how to blow glass.

In 1951, White assembled an international symposium on aviation medicine which became the basis of his book, "Physics and Medicine of the Upper Atmosphere," and demonstrated the need for collaborative work among disciplines. He stressed work across scientific disciplines throughout his career, stating he was "more and more concerned that we in this country and the world have moved way too far in the direction of specialties and not far enough in developing generalists and integrative endeavors."

Soon after the symposium, White, a "leader in aviation medicine before the term 'aerospace' was invented" began to consult with aircraft manufacturers and the developing airline industry. Subsequently, Lovelace Medical Center started to provide health care to airline pilots and flight crews. White fought to include female flight attendants – then called "hostesses" – in the Lovelace annual physical program and convinced TWA Airlines to fund it. Before that, hostesses did not have access to the same medical care every other member of the flight crew received.

Many of the legendary test pilots at Edwards Air Force Base in California, such as Scott Crossfield and Chuck Yeager, routinely visited Lovelace for medical consultation.In 1958, White and Randy Lovelace assembled the medical team that designed and conducted the exhaustive battery of tests on the thirty-two candidates competing to become Mercury astronauts. The so-called Mercury Seven, the first American astronauts to fly in space, included John Glenn, Scott Carpenter, and Alan Shepard. The tests at Lovelace were graphically depicted in the book and film, "The Right Stuff."

In 1951, the Lovelace Foundation received its first major contract from the Atomic Energy Commission (AEC), and White launched the work for which he is best known, the field of "blast and shock biology." At the time, most studies of the damage resulting from the 1945 bombings of Hiroshima and Nagasaki focused on radiation. But White was drawn to the unexplored devastation caused by the blast and shock wave emanating from the detonations. Observing the post-bombing landscape in Japan, he was fascinated by "how a bomb could flatten one building and leave an adjacent building untouched." He eventually developed mathematical formulae to explain the phenomenon. As he also noted, the teams that went to Japan to aid the bombing victims spent "more time … picking window glass out of victims than in treating any other injury" including radiation sickness.

Under AEC contracts, White and his team studied the effects of rapid environmental pressure variations induced by explosions, the damage caused by energized debris, the biological consequences of inhaling soluble and insoluble fission products, and other effects of high-impact detonations. White documented "whole body displacement," and a wide array of injuries caused by the blast. One of his major discoveries in blast injury was that air emboli in the lung's blood vessels were a significant cause of death.

Much of White's research was conducted at nuclear tests in the desert of the Nevada Test Site (an area established in 1951 for the testing of nuclear devices, now called the Nevada National Security Site) and at Sandia National Laboratories in Albuquerque where he and his team designed "shock tubes" through which air was forced at high velocity to mimic the effects of atomic blasts. In Nevada, White measured the effectiveness of bomb shelters, often using models and dummies he constructed in a small tool shop in his Albuquerque home garage.

From his collected data, in 1957, White and his team produced a "nuclear bomb effects computer," essentially a circular slide rule designed to "calculate 28 different effects, ranging from blast to thermal radiation, initial nuclear radiation, early fallout, crater dimensions, and fireball dimensions." The device was updated over the years and included in a sleeve at the back of Samuel Glasstone's book The Effects of Nuclear Weapons. A 1962 edition of the computer is in the permanent collection of the Smithsonian Institution's National Museum of American History. It is also displayed at the Bradbury Science Museum in Los Alamos, New Mexico. The computer appears in Stanley Kubrick's 1964 film, Dr. Strangelove or: How I Learned to Stop Worrying and Love the Bomb, when Peter Sellers, playing the president's demented scientific adviser, pulls the circular device from his jacket pocket to calculate how long people might need to remain in underground bunkers after a nuclear attack.

White's work in blast and shock biology led to advances in devising civil defense plans and treating victims of all kinds of blasts, from bombs to chemical explosions to high-impact accidents. He co-authored three major reports on the environmental consequences of nuclear explosions, charting the progression of an explosion with graphs depicting the relationship between the size of the blast and the distance materials traveled from Ground Zero. Throughout his career, he testified before Congress on nuclear weapons' biological effects, environmental impact, policy, and safety.

For nearly three decades, White led wide-ranging research at the Lovelace Foundation, first as director of research, then as President after William Randolph Lovelace II was killed in a private plane accident in 1965.^{[12]} White established the inter-disciplinary Inhalation Toxicology Research Institute at Lovelace to examine not only the effects of inhaling small fission particles produced by nuclear tests but also the environmental impact of consumer products on the ozone layer, and the health risks of inhaling manmade fibers, diesel exhaust, and other substances. Within years of its founding, the institute "earned worldwide distinction in the field of inhalation toxicology research."

White's other areas of study included aging, memory loss, hypothermia, cosmic rays, drought, pollution of the upper atmosphere, sun damage, health risks of smoking, and the impact of stress on the autonomic nervous system.

In 1974, White left Lovelace to become President of the Oklahoma Medical Research Foundation, a non-profit that conducts biomedical research in treating and curing human disease. In 1979, saying he missed the New Mexico mountains, he returned to Albuquerque to serve as President of the Lovelace Center for the Health Sciences.

In addition to authoring more than 125 scientific and technical articles, some of which remain classified, he wrote two books: Physics and Medicine of the Upper Atmosphere (1952) and Blast Biology (1960).

== Personal life and death ==
White was married for sixty-three years to Margaret "Peggy" Reeve, whom he met at the University of Colorado. They had three children: daughters Sharon and Meredith, and son Tracy, who grew up in a household where even making popcorn turned into a lesson on the thermodynamics inside a saucepan.

For many years, White served as a Rhodes Scholarship Secretary, which included vetting candidates for annual Rhodes consideration. As exacting in this work as in the laboratory, he often declined to forward a candidate, saying that his interviewees "failed to meet the Rhodes standard."

White and his brother maintained a deep bond throughout their lives. During Justice White's tenure on the Supreme Court, schoolchildren wrote the justices, asking each to name the person they most admired. Their answers centered on iconic figures: Abraham Lincoln, Mahatma Gandhi, and Oliver Wendell Holmes. Justice White offered a three-word answer: "My brother Sam."

In 1977, on the centennial celebration of the founding of the University of Colorado, Byron, and Sam White received Alumnus of the Century awards in law and medicine, respectively. Among other awards, Sam White received a U.S. Air Force Exceptional Service Award in 1960 and the National Disaster Preparedness Award in 1962.

White died on April 26, 2004, at the Lovelace Medical Center in Albuquerque, New Mexico.

== Honors ==
- State of New Mexico Distinguished Public Service award in 1973
- U.S. Air Force Exceptional Service Award in recognition of distinguished patriotic service from 1955 to 1960
- University of Colorado's Alumnus of the Century Award
- Dubious Achievement in Thermodynamics of Popping Corn, the Oklahoma Medical Research Foundation Employee Council.
