= Austin Hall (Harvard University) =

- U.S. National Register of Historic Places
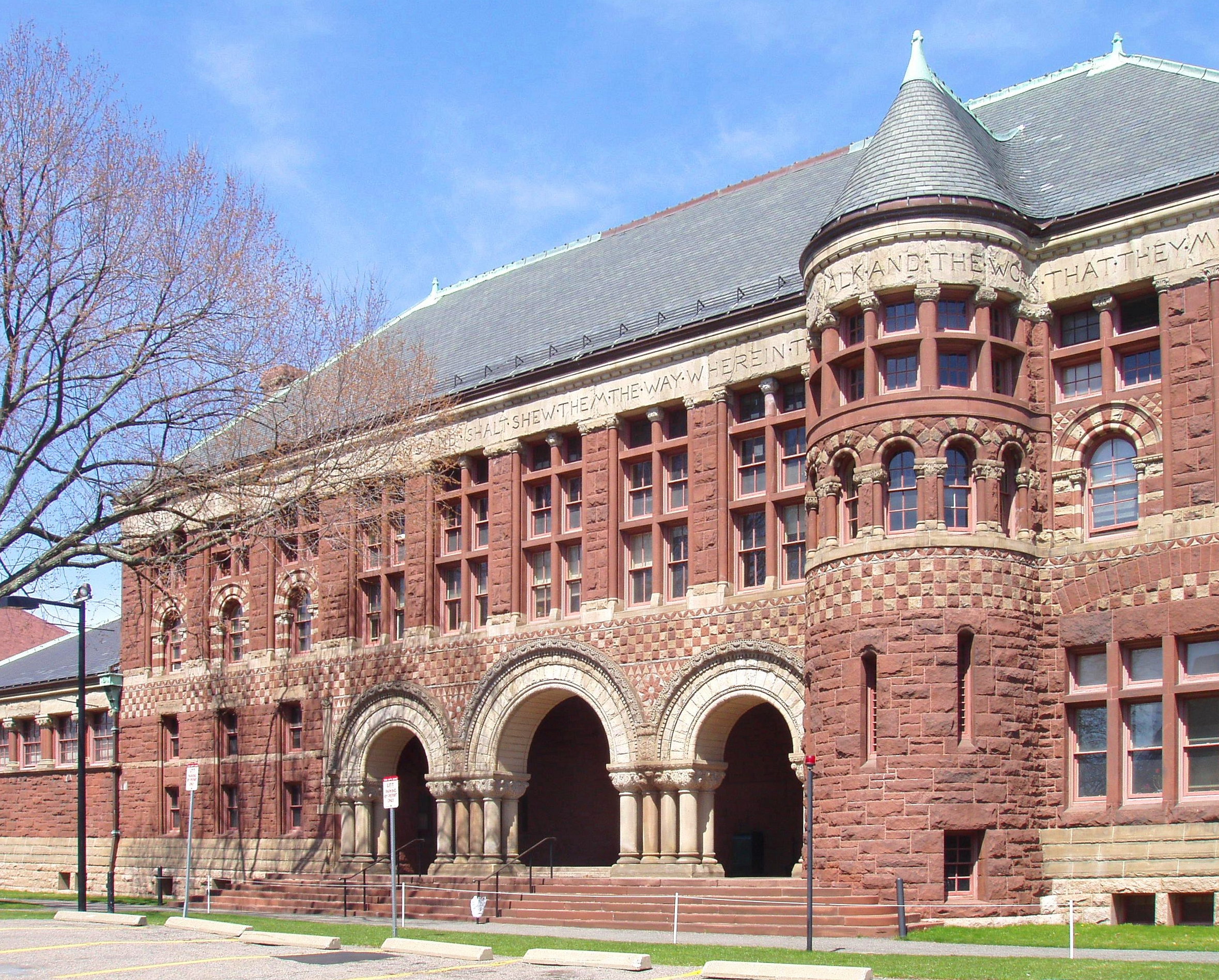
- Austin Hall

- Location within Massachusetts Location within the United States
- Location: Cambridge, Massachusetts
- Coordinates: 42°22′37.4″N 71°07′7.6″W
- Built: 1881
- Architect: Henry Hobson Richardson
- Architectural style: Romanesque
- NRHP reference No.: 72000128
- Added to NRHP: April 19, 1972

Austin Hall is a classroom building of the Harvard Law School designed by noted American architect H. H. Richardson. The first building purposely built for an American law school, it was also the first dedicated home of Harvard Law School. It is located on the historic Harvard University campus in Cambridge, Massachusetts, and was listed on the National Register of Historic Places in 1972.

== Construction ==
The hall was built 1882–1884 in Romanesque Revival style. Single-story wings flank a heavy, two-story central mass, with the reading room extending rearwards to form an overall T shape. A central entryway framed with Romanesque triple arch is set deep within the building's flat front facade, with an asymmetric stairway tower protruding forwards to its right. The building is faced with Longmeadow sandstone in striking polychrome patterns, the light stones forming checkerboards within dark, reddish walls. The arches are of pale Ohio sandstone, as is the thick cornice band incised with a lengthy and sententious motto.

== Design ==
Austin Hall's first floor contains three large classrooms; these were designed to complement the new law school curriculum that was being implemented at the time by Dean Christopher Columbus Langdell, including large core classes employing the Socratic method. As this curriculum has been imitated by other American law schools, so has the classroom layout first employed at Austin Hall.

The building's second floor contains the Ames Courtroom, where students argue moot cases before panels of judges. A United States Supreme Court justice usually presides over the moot court's final round. The reading room's interior has been judged particularly fine for its ornamented fireplace and tie beams carved with the heads of dragons and boars.

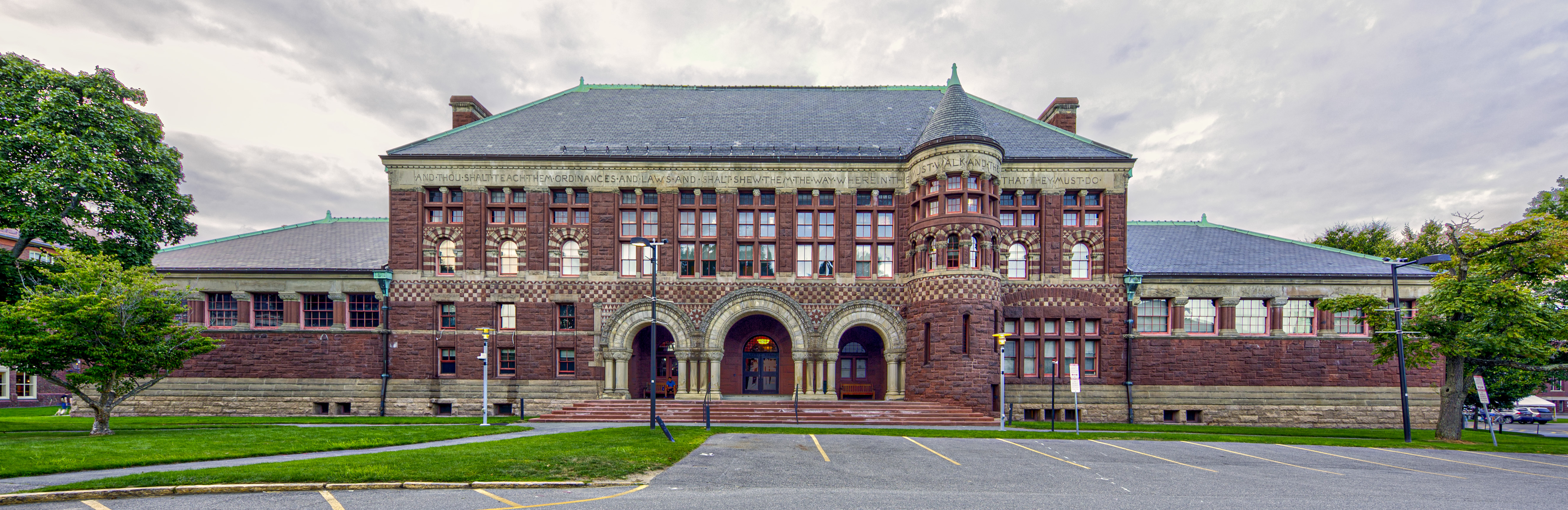
2024
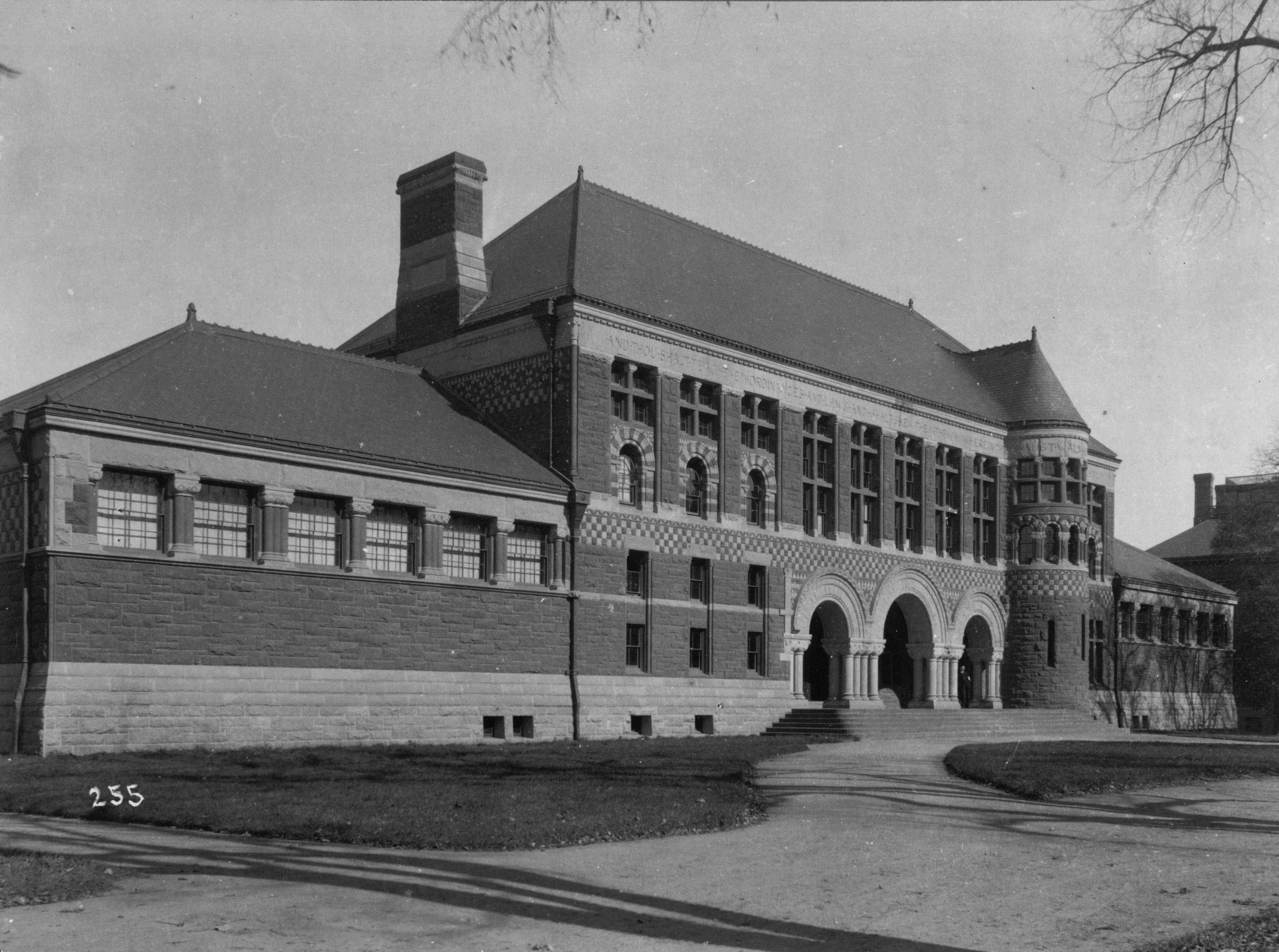
Austin Hall, shortly after its construction, albumen print, ca. 1883-1895

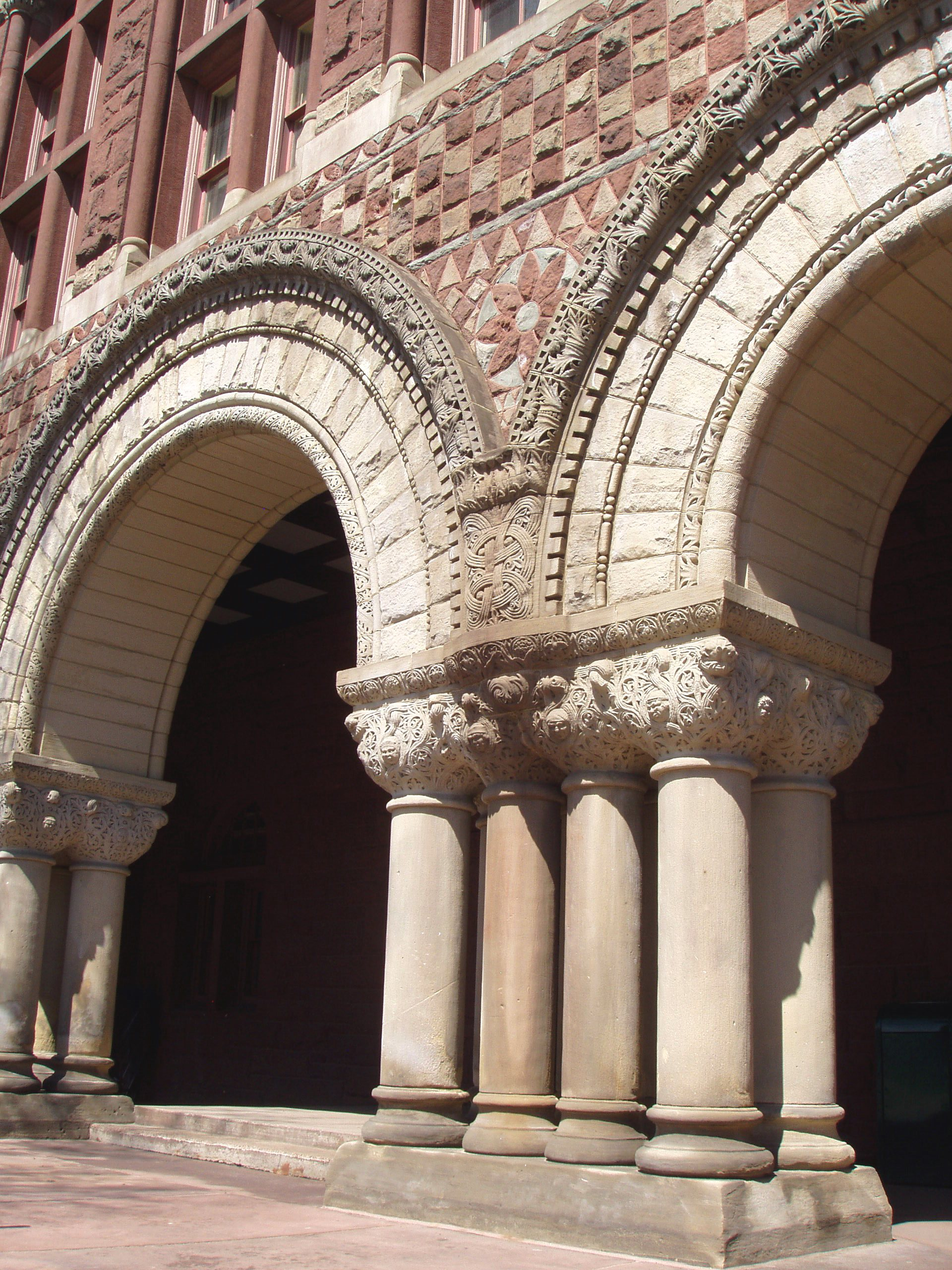
Entryway detail

== See also ==
- Sever Hall, Richardson's first Harvard commission
- National Register of Historic Places listings in Cambridge, Massachusetts
