= Langdell Hall =

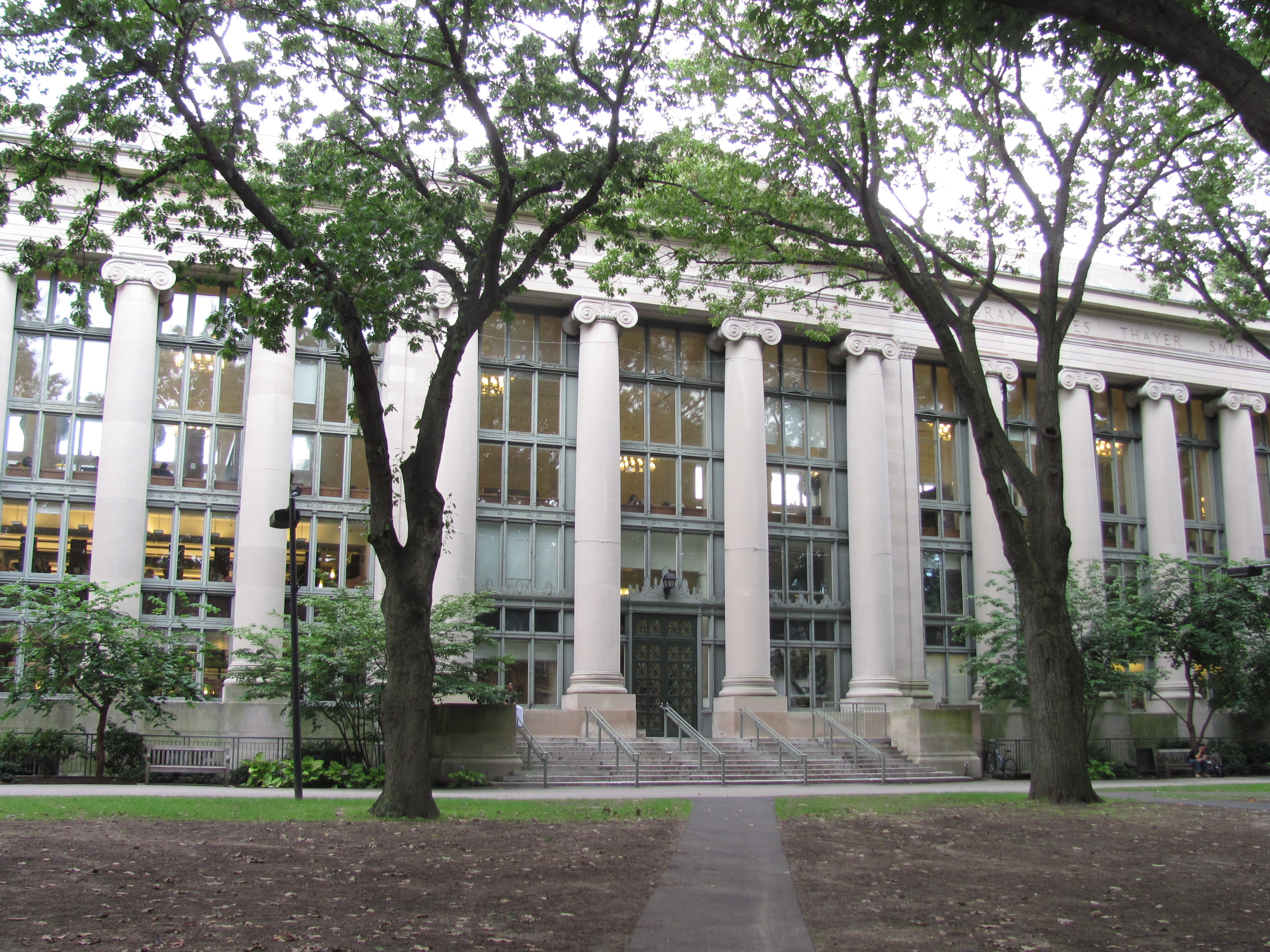
- Interactive map of the Langdell Hall area

General information
- Type: Library
- Architectural style: Modified neoclassical
- Location: Harvard Law School, Cambridge, Massachusetts, United States
- Coordinates: 42.3774°N 71.1183°W
- Named for: Christopher Columbus Langdell
- Year built: 1905–1907
- Renovated: 1928–1929, 1997
- Cost: $365,000
- Renovation cost: $1,500,000 (1928–1929)

Technical details
- Material: Limestone

Design and construction
- Architect: Shepley, Rutan and Coolidge

Renovating team
- Renovating firm: Coolidge, Shepley, Bulfinch, and Abbot (1928–1929); Shepley, Bulfinch, Richardson and Abbott (1997)

Langdell Hall is the largest building of Harvard Law School in Cambridge, Massachusetts. It is home to the school's library, the largest academic law library in the world, named after pioneering law school dean Christopher Columbus Langdell. It is built in a modified neoclassical style.

== Construction and design ==
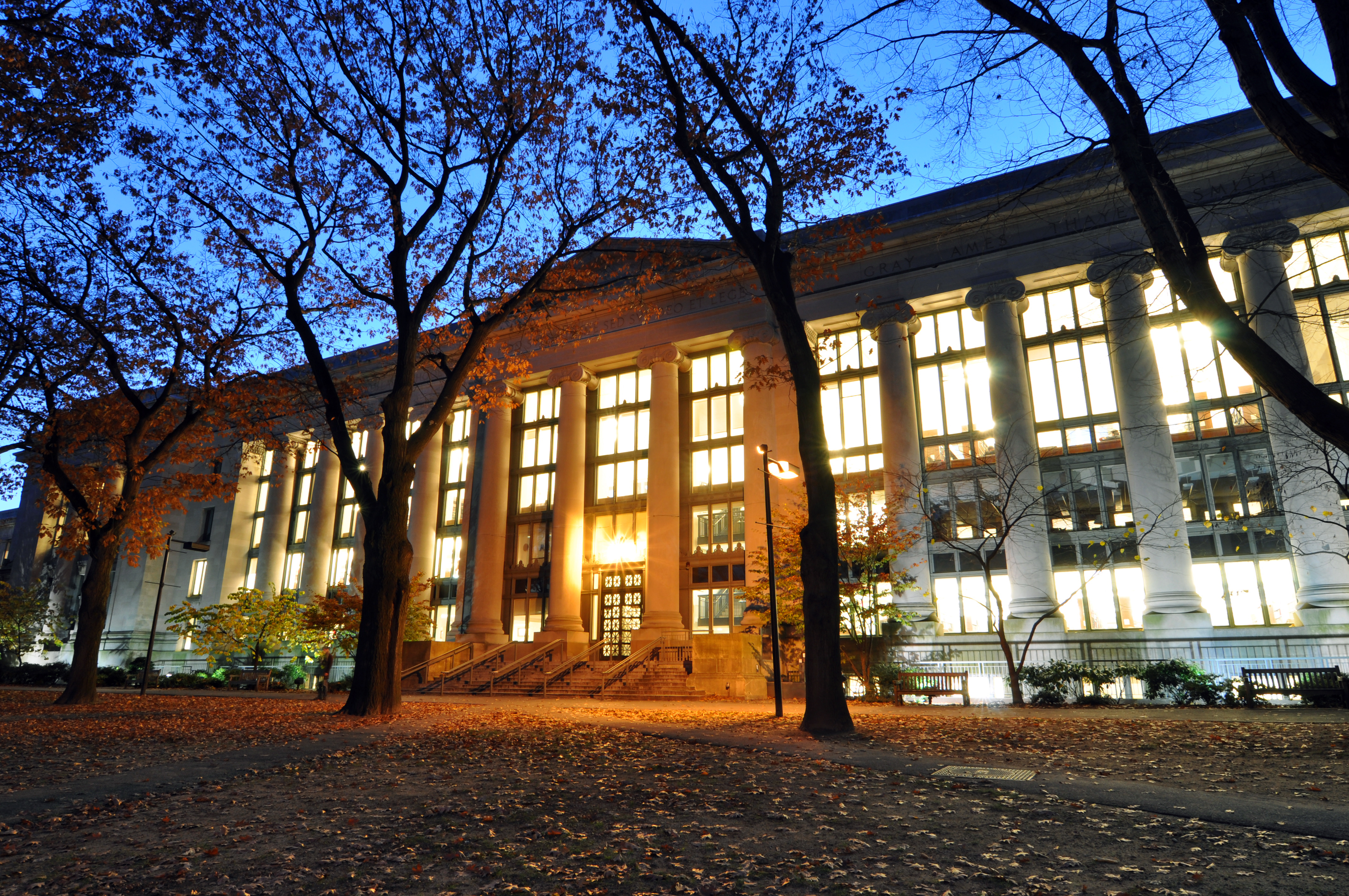
Langdell Hall at night, viewed from Holmes Field

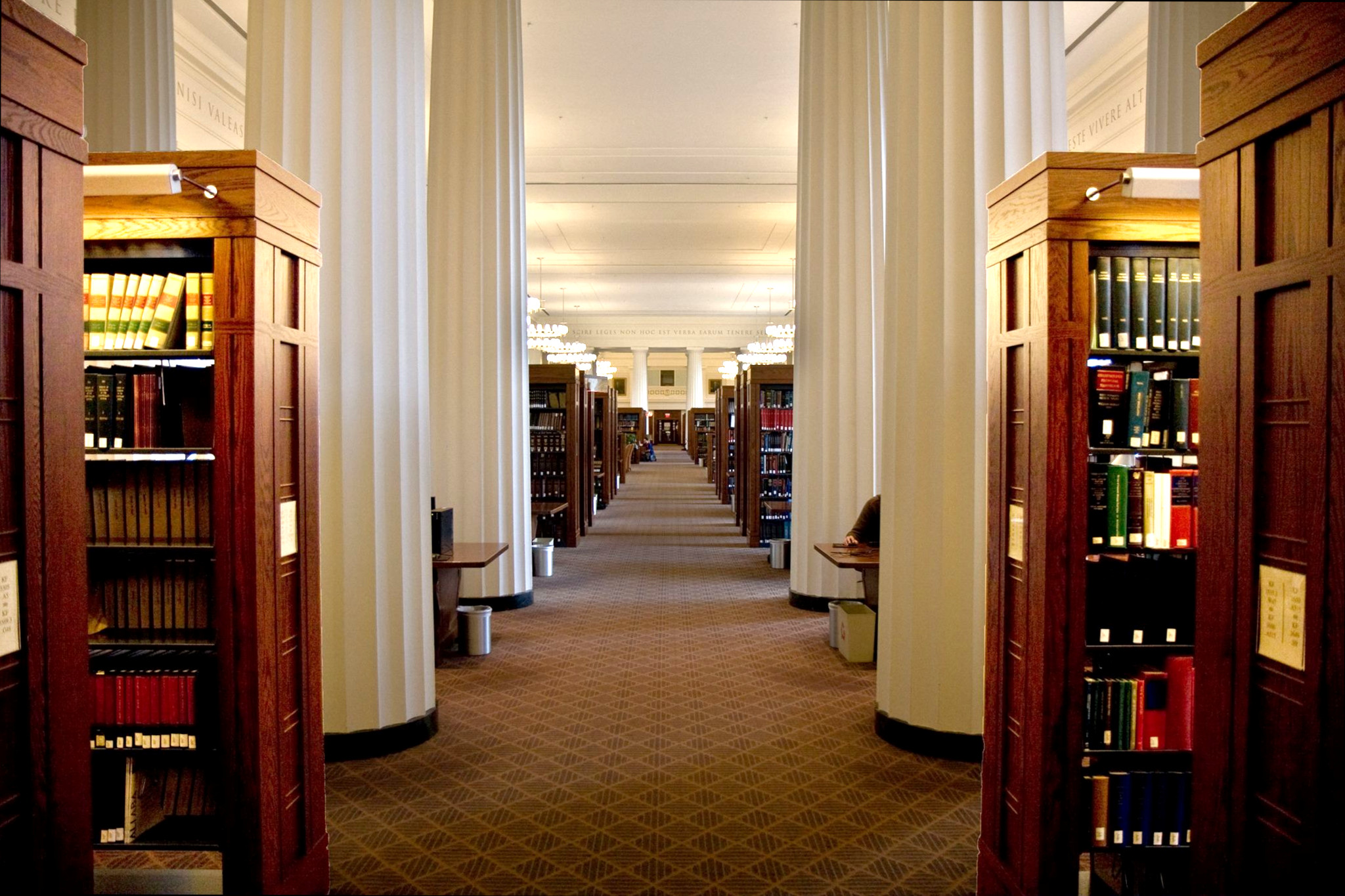
Langdell Hall interior

The building was commissioned in 1905 by law school dean James Barr Ames, as the school was outgrowing H. H. Richardson's Austin Hall. It was designed by Richardson's successor, the firm Shepley, Rutan and Coolidge. The southern wing was completed and occupied by the autumn of 1907, and nearly the entire building in use by January 1908.

The building's modified neoclassical facade, of buff limestone, features Ionic columns; the frieze bears Henry de Bracton's maxim, Non Sub Homine Sed Sub Deo Et Lege: "Not under Man, but under God and Law." The interior woodwork is dark oak. The library stack was designed for 300,000 volumes. A subway connects neighboring Austin Hall. The cost of construction was $365,000.

The same firm, under the name Coolidge, Shepley, Bulfinch and Abbott, completed a $1,500,000 enlargement in 1929, which added northern and western wings.

In 1959, the International Legal Studies building, now the Lewis International Law Center, was constructed to house approximately 300,000 volumes in open-stacks.

In 1997, Shepley, Bulfinch, Richardson and Abbott was appointed once again, this time to renovate the building. The renovations expanded the library, which now takes up most of the building, with the exception of two classrooms—the Vorenberg and Kirkland & Ellis. The renovation also included the installation of air conditioning and additional women's restrooms.

The Caspersen Room, named for HLS alumnus Finn M. W. Caspersen (J. D. 1966), was once the Treasure Room, housing rare books and manuscripts. In the lobby is a statue of Joseph Story, Harvard professor and Supreme Court justice, sculpted by his son, William Wetmore Story.
