= Byron White =

US Supreme Court justice and pro football player (1917–2002)

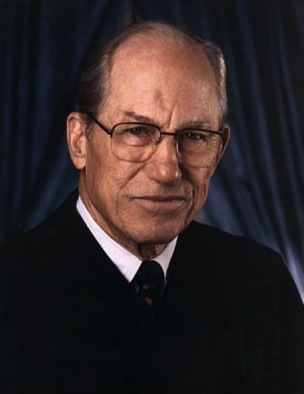

Associate Justice of the Supreme Court of the United States
- In office April 16, 1962 – June 28, 1993
- Nominated by: John F. Kennedy
- Preceded by: Charles Evans Whittaker
- Succeeded by: Ruth Bader Ginsburg

6th United States Deputy Attorney General
- In office January 20, 1961 – April 12, 1962
- President: John F. Kennedy
- Preceded by: Lawrence Walsh
- Succeeded by: Nicholas Katzenbach

Personal details
- Born: Byron Raymond White; June 8, 1917 Fort Collins, Colorado, U.S.
- Died: April 15, 2002 (aged 84) Denver, Colorado, U.S.
- Resting place: Saint John's Cathedral
- Party: Democratic
- Spouse: Marion Stearns (m. 1946)
- Children: 2
- Relatives: Clayton Sam White (brother)
- Education: University of Colorado Boulder (BA); Hertford College, Oxford; Yale University (LLB)
- Civilian awards: Presidential Medal of Freedom (2003)

Military service
- Allegiance: United States
- Branch/service: United States Navy
- Years of service: 1942–1945
- Rank: Lieutenant Commander
- Unit: Office of Naval Intelligence
- Battles/wars: World War II; Pacific Theater
- Military awards: Bronze Star (with Bronze Oak Leaf Cluster)
- Football career

No. 24, 44
- Position: Halfback

Personal information
- Listed height: 6 ft 1 in (1.85 m)
- Listed weight: 187 lb (85 kg)

Career information
- High school: Wellington (Colorado)
- College: Colorado (1935–1937)
- NFL draft: 1938: 1st round, 4th overall pick

Career history
- Pittsburgh Pirates (1938); Detroit Lions (1940–1941)

Awards and highlights
- 2× First-team All-Pro (1938, 1940); 2× NFL rushing yards leader (1938, 1940); NFL punting yards leader (1941); NFL 1940s All-Decade Team; Consensus All-American (1937); Colorado Buffaloes No. 24 retired

Career NFL statistics
- Rushing yards: 1,321
- Rushing average: 3.4
- Rushing touchdowns: 11
- Receptions: 16
- Receiving yards: 301
- Receiving touchdowns: 1
- Stats at Pro Football Reference
- College Football Hall of Fame

Other information
- Byron White's voice Byron White delivers the opinion of the Court in Zacchini v. Scripps-Howard Broadcasting Company; Recorded June 28, 1977

Byron Raymond "Whizzer" White (June 8, 1917 – April 15, 2002) was an American lawyer and professional football halfback who served as an associate justice of the Supreme Court of the United States from 1962 to 1993. At the time of his retirement, he was the Supreme Court's only sitting justice appointed by a Democrat and the last living member of the progressive Warren Court.

Born and raised in a small homestead in Wellington, Colorado, White distinguished himself as a student athlete who came from a background of poor farmhands to become a consensus All-American halfback for the Colorado Buffaloes. After being the runner-up for the Heisman Trophy in 1937, he was selected in the 1938 NFL draft by the Pittsburgh Pirates for the National Football League (NFL). He led the league in rushing yards during his rookie season. White graduated from the University of Colorado Boulder as class valedictorian, attaining a Rhodes Scholarship to study at Oxford University. After World War II forced him to return to the United States, he matriculated at Yale Law School, played for the Detroit Lions in the 1940 and 1941 seasons while still enrolled, and served as an officer for the United States Navy in the Pacific Theatre.

White graduated from law school with honors in 1946 and clerked for Chief Justice Fred M. Vinson. He eschewed work for a white-shoe firm and returned to Colorado in order to enter private practice in Denver as a transactional attorney. Minor work as the Colorado state chair of John F. Kennedy's 1960 presidential campaign led to him being unexpectedly tapped in 1961 for a position as U.S. Deputy Attorney General. He was successfully nominated by Kennedy to the Supreme Court the next year, becoming the Court's first justice from Colorado.

White espoused a pragmatic and non-doctrinaire judicial approach which strengthened the powers of the federal government, advocated for the desegregation of public schools, and upheld the use of affirmative action. Though expected to be a reliably liberal justice, he was by contrast a vociferous opponent of substantive due process, penning dissents in cases like Miranda v. Arizona and Roe v. Wade. White wrote the majority opinion in Bowers v. Hardwick (upholding the ability for states to restrict homosexual conduct) and dissented in Runyon v. McCrary (against the ability for the government to restrict racial discrimination in private schools) and Planned Parenthood v. Casey. Due to his unwillingness to consistently align with either the liberal or conservative blocs, White was largely oriented with the Court's ideological center.

== Early life and education ==
White was born in Fort Collins, Colorado, on June 8, 1917. His father, A. Albert White, managed a local lumber company. His mother, Maude Elizabeth (née Burger), was the daughter of German immigrants. He had one older brother, Clayton "Sam" Samuel White. Neither parent graduated high school, which was not unusual for farming communities at the time, but they instilled in their sons a heavy emphasis on education and took active roles in the local community. White and his brother were raised in the nearby town of Wellington where they attended the local high school. As a young student, White worked odd jobs to support his family during the town's decline in the 1920s; these included roles in harvesting beets, shoveling coal, and hard construction work, among other forms of manual labor. In his junior year, he and his brother rented out land and spent long hours in the fields, during which time White adopted a nearly lifelong habit of smoking.

Sam, four years White's senior, became an accomplished student and athlete who graduated as valedictorian, earning a scholarship to study at the University of Colorado, where he was later elected by the university to become a Rhodes Scholar. Whereas Sam was a gregarious and socially active child, White was described as a taciturn boy who "was very quiet, measuring every single word, showing no emotion, and revealing nothing."

White excelled academically in high school, graduating in 1934 as the class valedictorian with the highest grades in the school's history. He studied diligently in order to attain a scholarship to attend college, later describing his philosophy in Wellington as "do your work and don't be late for dinner." White followed his brother's footsteps in attending the University of Colorado Boulder on the scholarship offered to all Colorado high school valedictorians, intending to go to medical school and major in chemistry. Though he joined the Phi Gamma Delta fraternity on campus, he stuck to a strict routine of working and studying with little to no social life. However, he would become a star athlete after playing as an All-American halfback for the Colorado Buffaloes football team, winning a series of victories to become among the most acclaimed players in the country.

In 1935, Sam White was awarded a Rhodes Scholarship to study at Oxford University. After news of his brother's success became a local sensation, White saw his brother as an inspiration and felt pressured to achieve the scholarship himself. He served as student body president his senior year, switched his major to the humanities, and graduated Phi Beta Kappa and valedictorian from the University of Colorado in 1938 with a Bachelor of Arts degree in economics. In his last year, the Colorado Buffaloes went undefeated, (Note: As a senior, White led the 1937 Colorado Buffaloes football team to an undefeated 8–0 regular season, but they lost to favored Rice, 28–14 in the Cotton Bowl Classic on New Year's Day. He was the runner-up (behind Yale quarterback Clint Frank) for the Heisman Trophy, and also played basketball and baseball at CU. The basketball team advanced to the finals of the inaugural National Invitation Tournament at Madison Square Garden in March 1938.) and White's status as a football star earned him the moniker "Whizzer White" by the student newspaper. After months of study, White also attained the Rhodes Scholarship, deferring it for a year to play professional football before attending Hertford College. (Note: White originally planned to attend Oxford in 1938 and not play pro football. However, he was selected fourth overall in the 1938 NFL draft, held in December 1937, by the NFL's Pittsburgh Pirates (now Steelers), and became a Rhodes Scholar days later. Oxford allowed White to delay his start to early 1939, so he accepted the Pittsburgh offer in August and played the 1938 season in the NFL. He led the league in rushing as a 21-year-old rookie and was its highest-paid player.)

=== Oxford ===
On January 3, 1939, White sailed to England aboard the SS Europa, arriving in Southampton on January 9, harassed by reporters wishing to see a "Yank at Oxford." Upon moving into Hertford College with the intent of studying law, he befriended the future mathematician George Piranian and was assigned with C. H. S. Fifoot as a tutor. White spent his days at Oxford tirelessly studying from day until night, becoming "the only Rhodes scholar who ever worked fourteen hours a day on his studies." During one Easter vacation, he became acquainted with Joseph P. Kennedy Jr. and future U.S. president John F. Kennedy as their father, Joseph Kennedy Sr., was the U.S. ambassador to London. In the period of political upheaval just before the Second World War, Oxford students—Rhodes scholars especially—took an active role in international politics, with many American Rhodes scholars beckoning President Roosevelt to take action against Spanish nationalists. White, however, remained closed in the affairs of politics, rarely speaking out and becoming estranged from other students; he prioritized his studies and physique above all else.

Following the end of a term, White spent a summer vacation touring France and Germany, settling down in Munich in order to study the German language and Roman law. He unexpectedly reunited with John F. Kennedy, who was on his own tour of Europe with Torbert Macdonald, and on one occasion the three were heckled by a mob who recognized their English license plates. White left Germany to return to Oxford in late August 1939. The war made it impossible for American students to continue studying at Oxford, and White chose to return to the U.S. in order to continue his legal education at Yale Law School.

=== Law school ===
Upon enrolling at Yale, White continued his previous routine of studying fourteen hours a day, taking breaks only to exercise in the gymnasium where he would frequent the basketball courts, often clashing against Yale halfback Clint Frank in pick-up games. Despite attempts by the New York Giants and other NFL teams to get him to sign back into football, White publicly repudiated his football career, telling a local newspaper that "my football playing days are over. I'm started on a law career."

At the time, Yale was home to a number of legal realists who rebuked Lochner and substantive due process, and were generally scholars with an expertise in legal fields outside of constitutional law. Two of such realists—Myres S. McDougal and Arthur Corbin—had a significant influence on White early in law school. Future justice Potter Stewart, one year ahead of him at the university, remembered White as "a serious-minded, scholarly, and rather taciturn (except when he found himself engaged in lively colloquy with J. W. Moore in his class on Procedure), and extremely likable young man with steel-rimmed eyeglasses."

White earned the highest grades in his first-year class and was subsequently awarded the Edgar M. Cullen Prize, an award given to the highest-achieving first-year student. During the summer, he returned to Colorado and attended summer school at the University of Colorado Law School, got an appendectomy, and became a waiter at his old fraternity. White would turn down an offer to join the editorship of the Yale Law Journal, instead taking a leave of absence to promptly return to professional football as a member of the Detroit Lions.

=== Professional football ===
White came into the National Football League with the then-Pirates in the summer of 1938 as a widely heralded college star. The $15,800 contract he had signed made White the NFL's highest-paid player. About his first game, one Pittsburgh journalist said he "looked better as an individual than the Pirates did as a team". Despite leading the NFL in rushing yards in 1938, White did not appear for the 1939 season. He would reappear for the Detroit Lions in 1940 and would again top the world of "postgraduate football" with a league-leading performance in rushing.

White played a total of three NFL seasons — 33 games in all. He led the league in rushing twice during that short interval, and was elected the NFL's first team All-Pro right halfback in 1940.

=== World War II ===
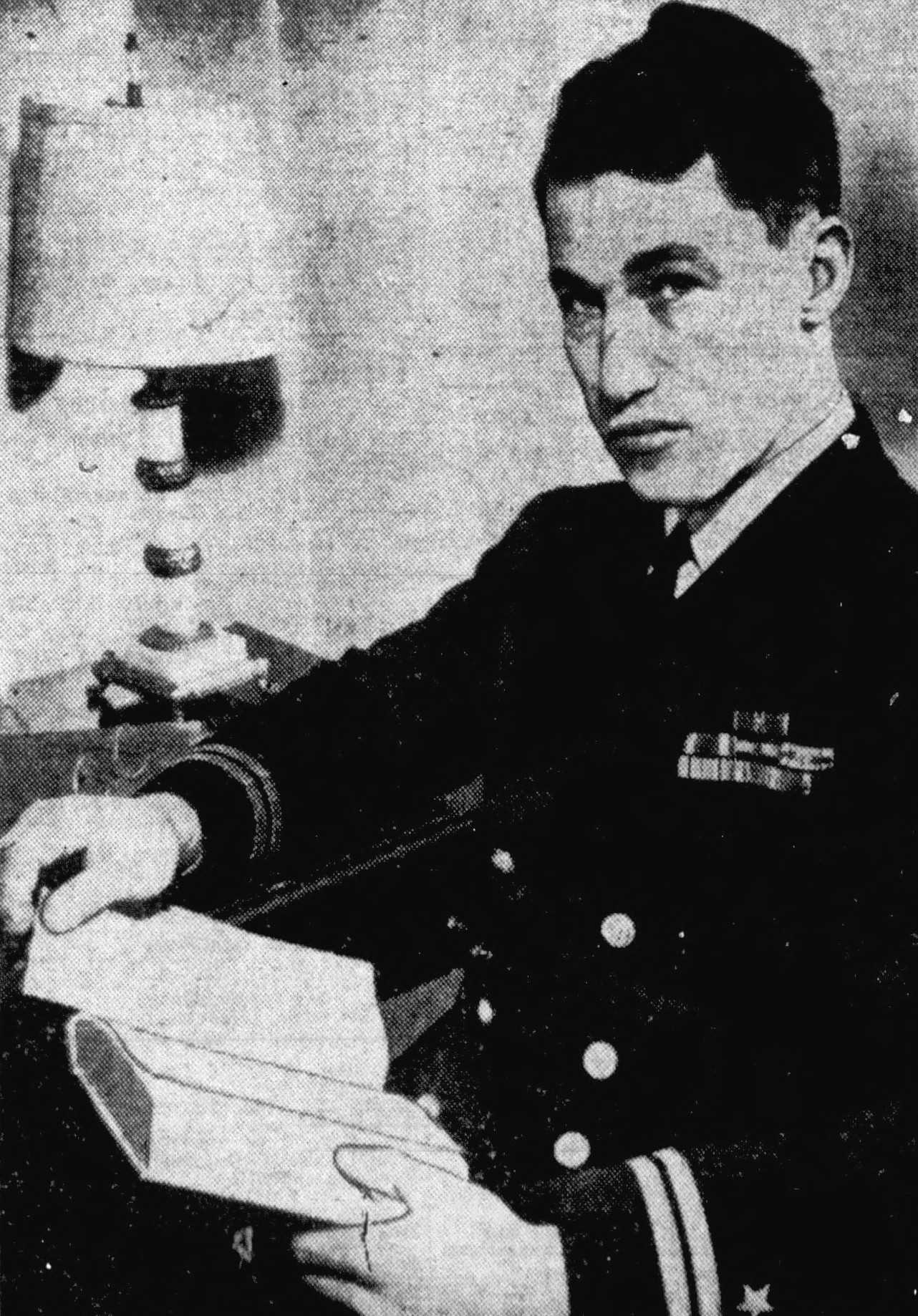
White in 1945

At the end of 1941 Lions season, White returned to Yale to await a call to serve in the U.S. Navy after the Attack on Pearl Harbor. In May 1942, he was assigned to naval intelligence and spent weeks training at Dartmouth College and in New York City. His original intention was to join the Marine Corps, but was kept out due to being colorblind.

In July 1943, White was stationed at Nouméa, New Caledonia, tasked with protecting Guadalcanal and Tulagi; he narrowly missed being assigned with John F. Kennedy, his former acquaintance who had also been stationed at Tulagi before being reassigned to the Russell Islands. During World War II, White served as an intelligence officer in the Navy, and was stationed in the Pacific Theatre. He wrote the intelligence report on the sinking of future President John F. Kennedy's PT-109. For his service, White was awarded two Bronze Star medals, and was honorably discharged as a lieutenant commander in 1945.

== Legal career ==
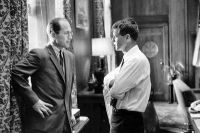
Byron White with Robert Kennedy in 1961

After his military service, White returned to Yale Law School, graduating in 1946 ranked first in his class with a Bachelor of Laws degree, magna cum laude, and membership in the Order of the Coif. White served as a law clerk to Chief Justice Fred M. Vinson of the U.S. Supreme Court from 1946 to 1947, then returned to Colorado and entered private practice in Denver with the law firm now known as Davis Graham & Stubbs. This was a time in which the Denver economy flourished, and White rendered legal service to the business community. White was for the most part a transactional attorney; he drafted contracts and advised insolvent companies, and he argued the occasional case in court.

During the 1960 presidential election, White used his status as a football star to aid him as chair of John F. Kennedy's campaign in Colorado. White had first met the candidate when White was a Rhodes scholar and Kennedy's father, Joseph Kennedy, was Ambassador to the Court of St. James's. During the Kennedy administration, White served as United States Deputy Attorney General, the number two man in the Justice Department, under Robert F. Kennedy. He took the lead in protecting the Freedom Riders in 1961, negotiating with Alabama Governor John Malcolm Patterson.

== Supreme Court ==
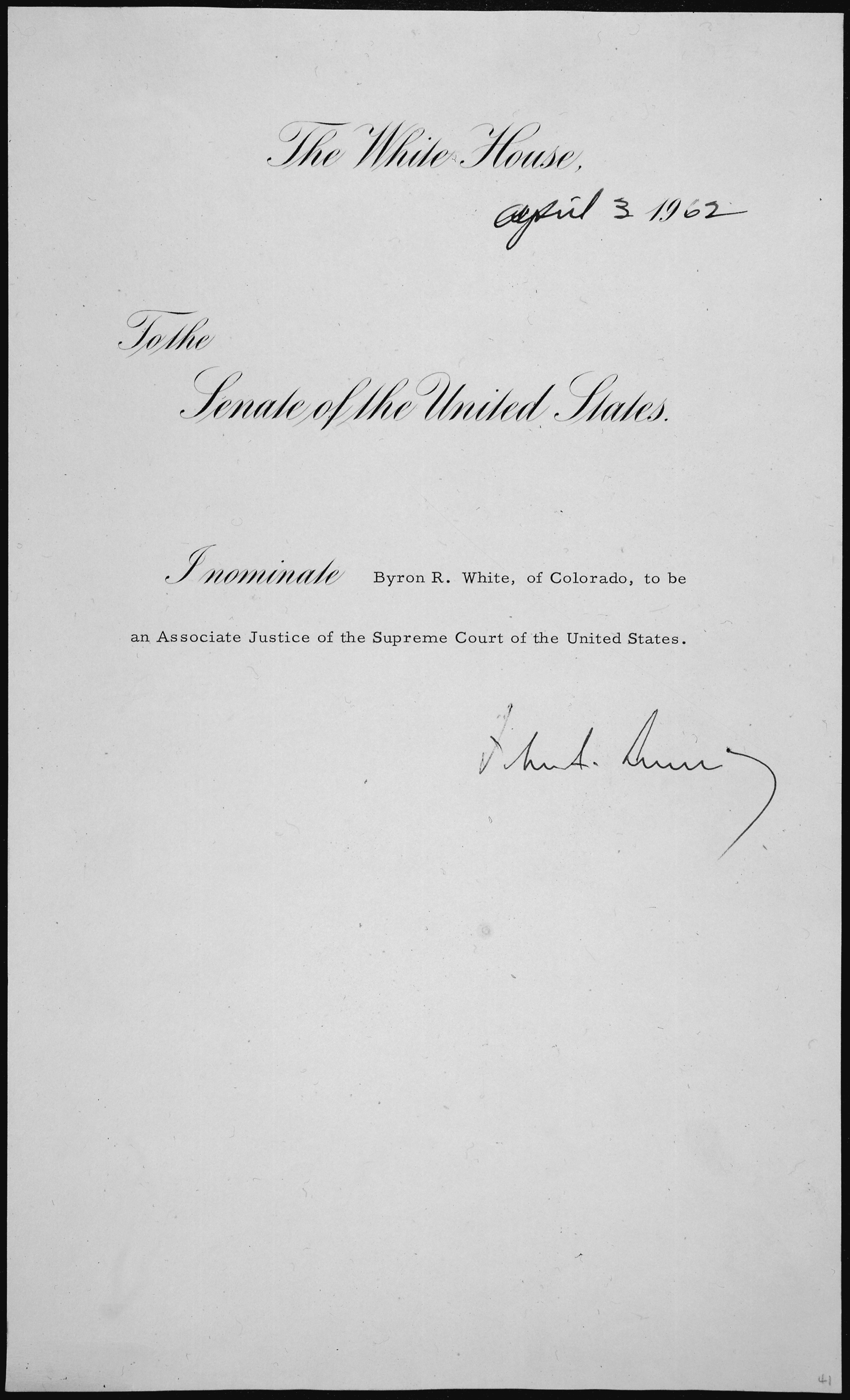
John F. Kennedy's letter to the Senate nominating White to the Supreme Court

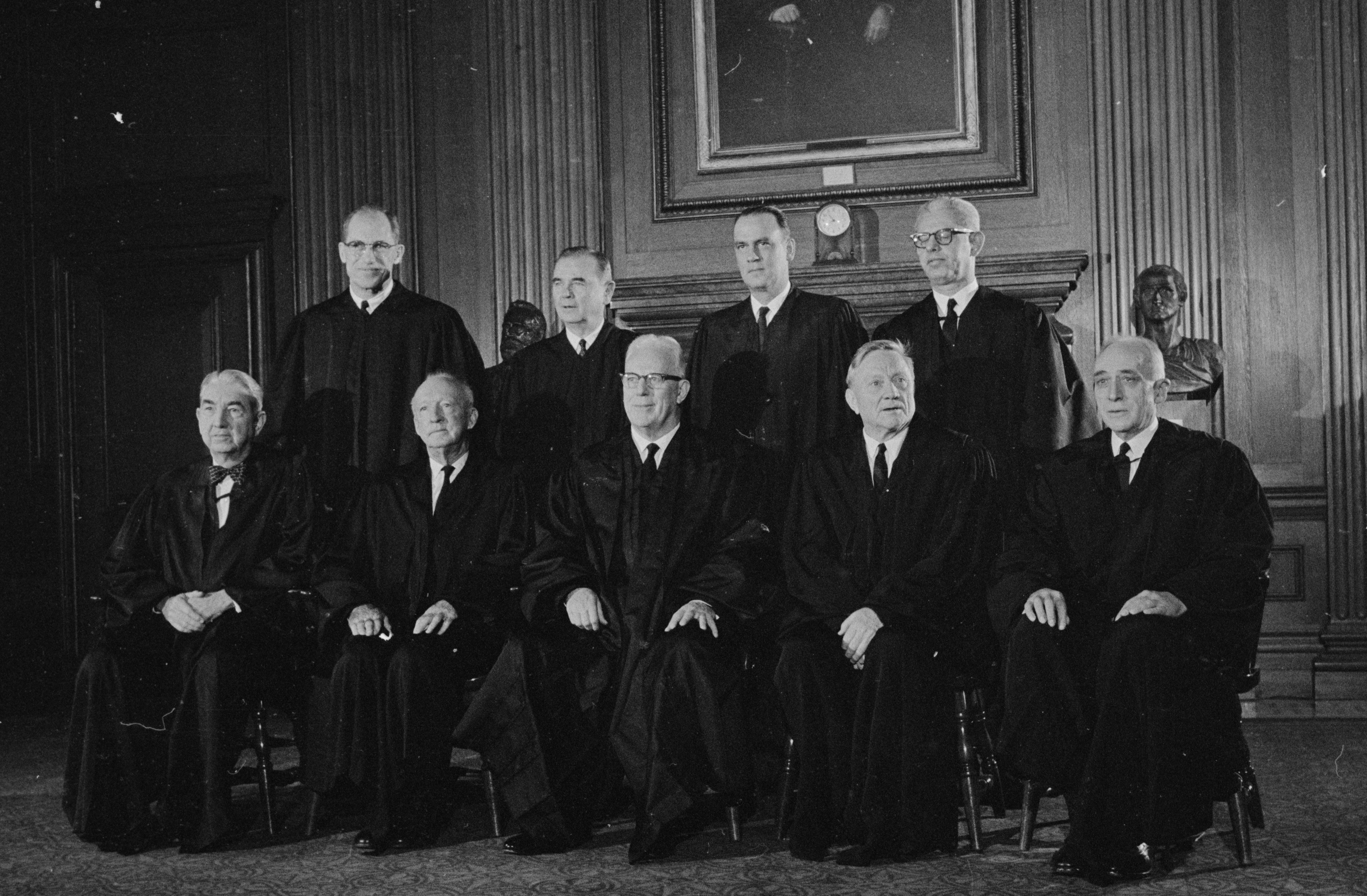
The Supreme Court seen pictured on November 19, 1962. White (top left) was the Court's second most junior justice, after Arthur Goldberg, having arrived on the bench in April.

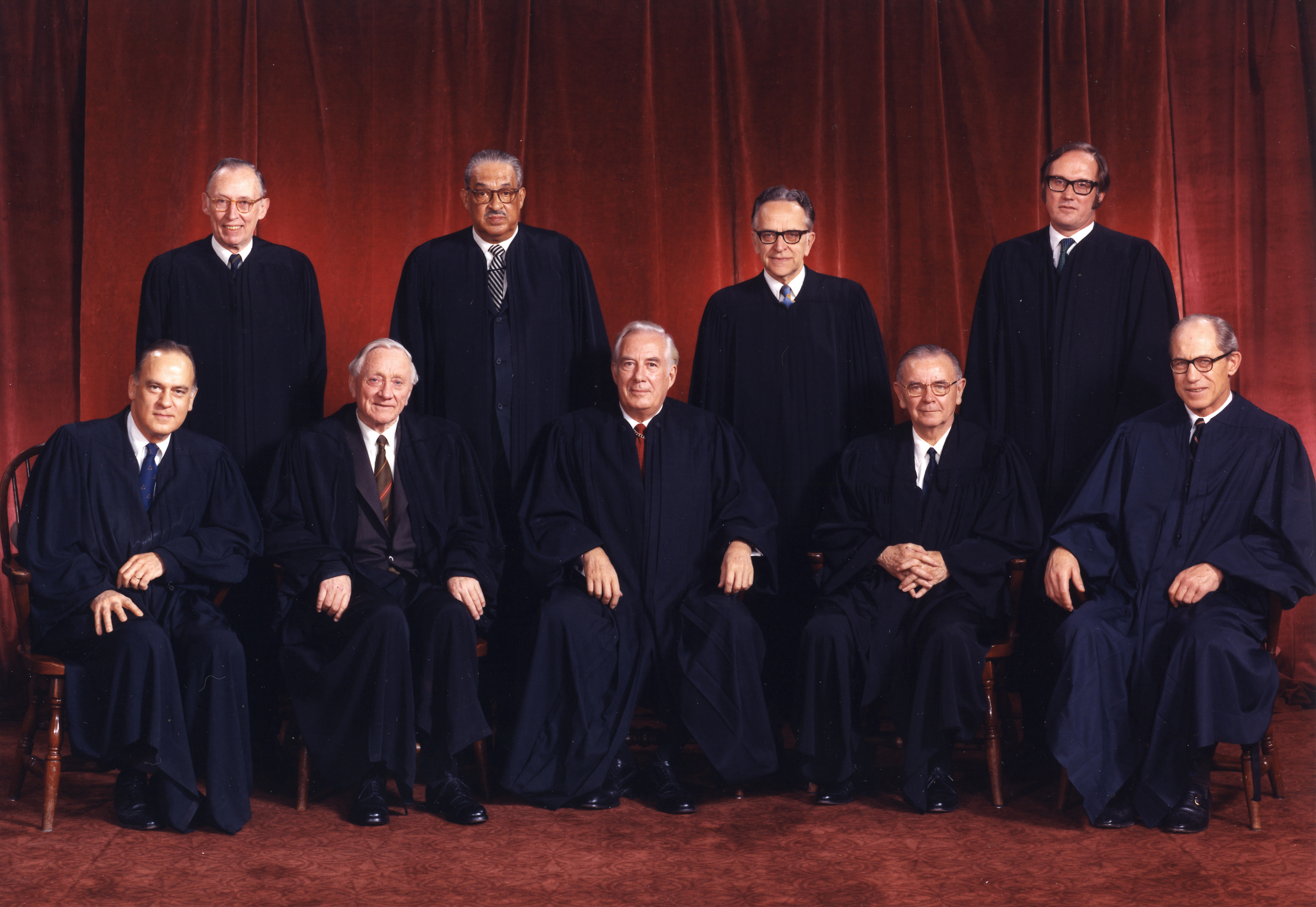
The Supreme Court pictured in 1973, White is pictured at bottom right

On April 3, 1962, President Kennedy nominated White to be an associate justice of the Supreme Court, succeeding Charles Evans Whittaker. The president said of White—a longtime friend of his—that "he has excelled at everything. And I know that he will excel on the highest court in the land." White was confirmed on April 11, 1962, by a voice vote. He took the judicial oath of office on April 16, 1962, and served until June 28, 1993. His Supreme Court tenure was the fourth-longest of the 20th century.

Upon the request of Vice President-Elect Al Gore, White administered the oath of office on January 20, 1993, to Gore. It was the only time White administered an oath of office to a vice president. During his service on the high court, White wrote 994 opinions. He was fierce in questioning attorneys in court, and his votes and opinions on the bench reflect an ideology that has been notoriously difficult for popular journalists and legal scholars alike to pin down. He was seen as a disappointment by some Kennedy supporters who wished he had joined the more liberal wing of the court in its opinions on Miranda v. Arizona and Roe v. Wade.

White often took a narrow, fact-specific view of cases before the Court and generally refused to make broad pronouncements on constitutional doctrine or adhere to a specific judicial philosophy, preferring what he viewed as a practical approach to the law. In the tradition of the New Deal, White frequently supported a broad view and expansion of governmental powers. He consistently voted against creating constitutional restrictions on the police, dissenting in the landmark 1966 case Miranda v. Arizona. In that dissent, he said that aggressive police practices enhance the individual rights of law-abiding citizens. His jurisprudence has sometimes been praised for adhering to the doctrine of judicial restraint.

=== Substantive due process doctrine ===
Frequently a critic of the doctrine of "substantive due process", which involves the judiciary reading substantive content into the term "liberty" in the Due Process Clause of the Fifth Amendment and Fourteenth Amendment, White's first published opinion as a Supreme Court Justice was a joint dissent with Justice Clark in Robinson v. California (1962), foreshadowing his career-long distaste for the doctrine. In Robinson, he criticized the remainder of the Court's unprecedented expansion of the Eighth Amendment's prohibition of "cruel and unusual punishment" to strike down a California law providing for civil commitment of drug addicts. He argued that the Court was "imposing its own philosophical predilections" on the state in this exercise of judicial power, although its historic "allergy to substantive due process" would never permit it to strike down a state's economic regulatory law in such a manner.

In the same vein, he dissented in the controversial 1973 case Roe v. Wade. White voted to strike down a state ban on contraceptives in the 1965 case of Griswold v. Connecticut, although he did not join the majority opinion, which famously asserted a "right of privacy" on the basis of the "penumbras" of the Bill of Rights. White and Justice William Rehnquist were the only dissenters from the Court's decision in Roe, though White's dissent used stronger language, suggesting that Roe was "an exercise in raw judicial power" and criticizing the decision for "interposing a constitutional barrier to state efforts to protect human life." White, who usually adhered firmly to the doctrine of stare decisis, remained a critic of Roe throughout his term on the bench and frequently voted to uphold laws restricting abortion, including in Planned Parenthood v. Casey in 1992.

White explained his general views on the validity of substantive due process at length in his dissent in Moore v. City of East Cleveland (1977):

The Judiciary, including this Court, is the most vulnerable and comes nearest to illegitimacy when it deals with judge-made constitutional law having little or no cognizable roots in the language or even the design of the Constitution. Realizing that the present construction of the Due Process Clause represents a major judicial gloss on its terms, as well as on the anticipation of the Framers, and that much of the underpinning for the broad, substantive application of the Clause disappeared in the conflict between the Executive and the Judiciary in the 1930s and 1940s, the Court should be extremely reluctant to breathe still further substantive content into the Due Process clause so as to strike down legislation adopted by a State or city to promote its welfare. Whenever the Judiciary does so, it unavoidably pre-empts for itself another part of the governance of the country without express constitutional authority.

White parted company with Rehnquist in strongly supporting the Supreme Court decisions striking down laws that discriminated on the basis of sex, agreeing with Justice William J. Brennan in 1973's Frontiero v. Richardson that such laws should be subject to strict scrutiny. Only three justices joined Brennan's plurality opinion in Frontiero; later gender discrimination cases would be subjected to intermediate scrutiny (see Craig v. Boren). In Rostker v. Goldberg, White joined Brennan and Marshall in dissent arguing that male-only Selective Service registration was unconstitutional.

White wrote the majority opinion in Bowers v. Hardwick (1986), which upheld Georgia's anti-sodomy law against a substantive due process attack:

The Court is most vulnerable and comes nearest to illegitimacy when it deals with judge-made constitutional law having little or no cognizable roots in the language or design of the Constitution.... There should be, therefore, great resistance to ... redefining the category of rights deemed to be fundamental. Otherwise, the Judiciary necessarily takes to itself further authority to govern the country without express constitutional authority.

White's opinion in Bowers typified his fact-specific, deferential style, treating the issue in that case as presenting only the question of whether homosexuals had a fundamental right to privacy, even though the statute in Bowers potentially applied to heterosexual sodomy. Georgia, however, conceded during oral argument that the law would be inapplicable to married couples under the precedent set forth in Griswold v. Connecticut. A year after White's death, Bowers was overruled in Lawrence v. Texas (2003).

=== Death penalty ===
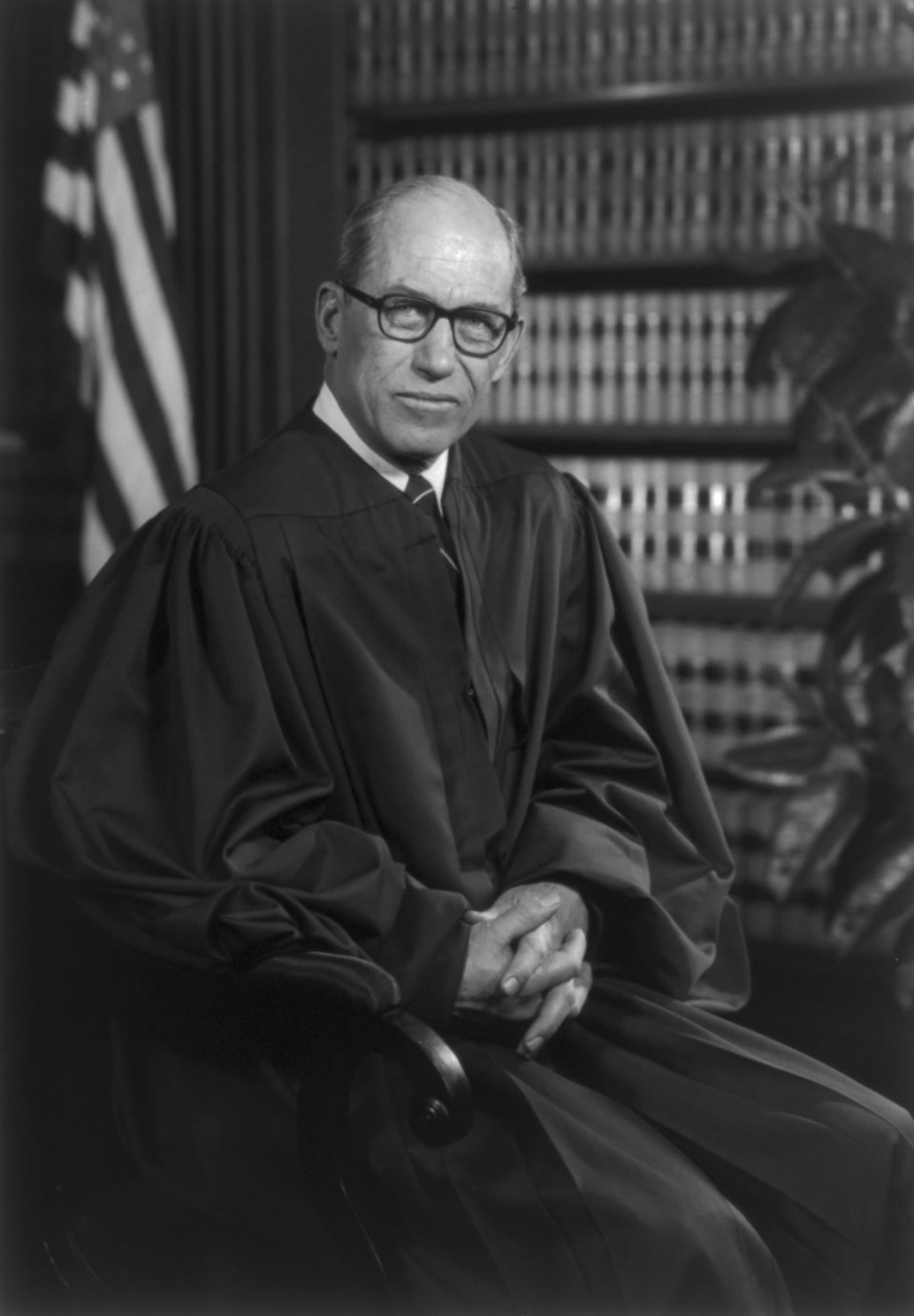
Official portrait, 1976

White took a middle course on the issue of the death penalty: he was one of five justices who voted in Furman v. Georgia (1972) to strike down several state capital punishment statutes, voicing concern over the arbitrary way in which the death penalty was administered. The Furman decision ended capital punishment in the U.S. until the court's ruling in Gregg v. Georgia (1976). In that case, White voted to uphold Georgia's new capital punishment law.

White accepted the position that the Eighth Amendment to the United States Constitution required that all punishments be "proportional" to the crime; thus, in Coker v. Georgia (1977), he wrote the opinion that invalidated the death penalty for rape of a 16-year-old married girl. His first reported Supreme Court decision was a dissent in Robinson v. California (1962), in which he criticized the Court for extending the reach of the Eighth Amendment. In Robinson the Court for the first time expanded the constitutional prohibition of "cruel and unusual punishments" from examining the nature of the punishment imposed and whether it was an uncommon punishment − as, for example, in the cases of flogging, branding, banishment, or electrocution − to deciding whether any punishment at all was appropriate for the defendant's conduct. White said: "If this case involved economic regulation, the present Court's allergy to substantive due process would surely save the statute and prevent the Court from imposing its own philosophical predilections upon state legislatures or Congress." Consistent with his view in Robinson, White thought that imposing the death penalty on minors was constitutional, and he was one of the three dissenters in Thompson v. Oklahoma (1988), a decision that declared that the death penalty as applied to offenders below 16 years of age was unconstitutional as a cruel and unusual punishment.

=== Abortion ===
Along with Justice William Rehnquist, White dissented in Roe v. Wade (the dissenting decision was in the companion case, Doe v. Bolton), castigating the majority for holding that the U.S. Constitution "values the convenience, whim or caprice of the putative mother more than the life or potential life of the fetus."

Though White was generally an advocate of Stare Decisis, he consistently voted to weaken or outright overrule Roe whenever cases involving it came before the Supreme Court for the remainder of his career, with his final vote on the issue of abortion being his joining of the dissents of Scalia and Rehnquist in Planned Parenthood v. Casey advocating the overruling of Roe.

=== Civil rights ===
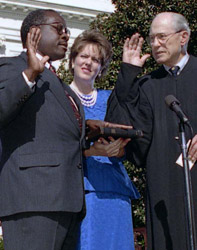
White swears in Justice Clarence Thomas as Thomas' wife, Virginia Lamp, looks on (1991)

White consistently supported the Court's post-Brown v. Board of Education attempts to fully desegregate public schools, even through the controversial line of forced busing cases. He voted to uphold affirmative action remedies to racial inequality in an education setting in the famous Regents of the University of California v. Bakke case of 1978. Though White voted to uphold federal affirmative action programs in cases such as Metro Broadcasting, Inc. v. FCC, 497 U.S. 547 (1990) (later overruled by Adarand Constructors v. Peña, 515 U.S. 200 (1995)), he voted to strike down an affirmative action plan regarding state contracts in Richmond v. J.A. Croson Co. (1989).

White dissented in Runyon v. McCrary (1976), which held that federal law prohibited private schools from discriminating on the basis of race. He argued that the legislative history of 42 U.S.C. § 1981 (popularly known as the "Ku Klux Klan Act") indicated that the Act was not designed to prohibit private racial discrimination but only state-sponsored racial discrimination (as had been held in the Civil Rights Cases of 1883). White was concerned about the potential far-reaching impact of holding private racial discrimination illegal, which if taken to its logical conclusion might ban many varied forms of voluntary self-segregation, including social and advocacy groups that limited their membership to blacks: "Whether such conduct should be condoned or not, whites and blacks will undoubtedly choose to form a variety of associational relationships pursuant to contracts which exclude members of the other race. Social clubs, black and white, and associations designed to further the interests of blacks or whites are but two examples". Runyon was essentially overruled by 1989's Patterson v. McLean Credit Union, which itself was superseded by the Civil Rights Act of 1991.

=== Relationships with other justices ===
White said he was most comfortable on Rehnquist's court. He once said of Earl Warren, "I wasn't exactly in his circle." On the Burger Court, the chief justice often assigned important criminal procedure and individual rights opinions to White because of his frequently conservative views on these questions.

=== Court operations and retirement ===
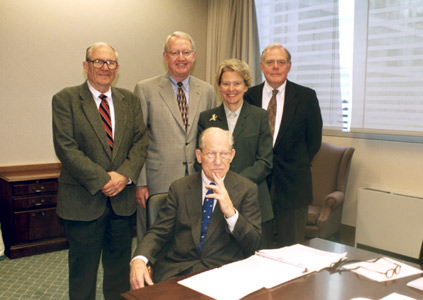
White (sitting) with other members of the Commission on Structural Alternatives for the Federal Courts of Appeals

White frequently urged the Supreme Court to consider cases when federal appeals courts were in conflict on issues of federal law, believing that resolving such was a primary role of the Supreme Court. Thus, White voted to grant certiorari more often than many of his colleagues; he also wrote numerous opinions dissenting from denials of certiorari. After White (along with fellow Justice Harry Blackmun, who also often voted for liberal grants of certiorari) retired, the number of cases heard each session of the Court declined steeply.

White disliked the politics of Supreme Court appointments, but had great faith in representative democracy, responding to complaints about politicians and mediocrity in government with exhortations to "get more involved and help fix it." He retired in 1993, during Bill Clinton's presidency, saying that "someone else should be permitted to have a like experience." When he retired, White was the only remaining justice appointed by a Democrat on the Court. Clinton nominated, and the Senate approved, Justice Ruth Bader Ginsburg, a judge from the U.S. Court of Appeals for the D.C. Circuit and a former Columbia University law professor, to succeed him.

== Later years and death ==
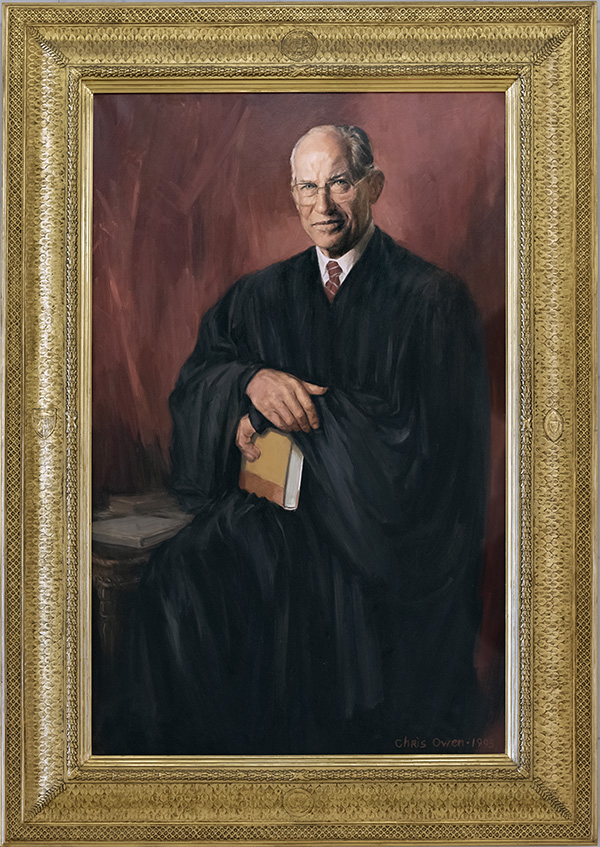
Portrait of White

After retiring from the Supreme Court, White occasionally sat with lower federal courts. He maintained chambers in the federal courthouse in Denver until shortly before his death. He also served for the Commission on Structural Alternatives for the Federal Courts of Appeals.

White died of pneumonia on April 15, 2002, at the age of 84. He was the last surviving Justice of the Warren Court, and the last justice appointed by Kennedy; he died the day before the fortieth anniversary of his swearing in as a Justice. From his death until the retirement of Sandra Day O'Connor in January 2006, there were no living former justices.

His remains are interred at All Souls Walk at St. John's Cathedral in Denver.

Then-Chief Justice Rehnquist commented that White "came as close as anyone I have known to meriting Matthew Arnold's description of Sophocles: 'He saw life steadily and he saw it whole.' All of us who served with him will miss him."

== Personal life ==
White first met his wife Marion Stearns (1921–2009), the daughter of the president of the University of Colorado, when she was in high school and he was a college football player. During World War II, Marion served in the WAVES while her future husband was a Navy intelligence officer. They married in 1946 and had two children: a son named Charles Byron (Barney) and a daughter named Nancy.

His older brother Clayton Samuel "Sam" White (1912–2004) was also a high school valedictorian and Rhodes Scholar. He later became a physician and medical researcher, particularly on the effects of atomic bomb blasts.

== Awards and honors ==
The NFL Players Association gives the Byron "Whizzer" White NFL Man of the Year Award to one player each year for his charity work. Michael McCrary, who was involved in Runyon v. McCrary, grew up to be a professional football player and won the award in 2000.

Of all the athletes I have known in my lifetime, I'd have to say Whizzer White came as close to anyone to giving 100 percent of himself when he was in competition.
— Pittsburgh Pirates owner
Art Rooney

The federal courthouse in Denver that houses the Tenth Circuit is named after White.

White was elected to the College Football Hall of Fame in 1952.

White was made an honorary fellow of Hertford College, Oxford.

White was posthumously awarded the Presidential Medal of Freedom in 2003 by President George W. Bush.

White was inducted into the Rocky Mountain Athletic Conference Hall of Fame on July 14, 2007, in addition to being a member of the College Football Hall of Fame and the University of Colorado's Athletic Hall of Fame, where he is enshrined as "The Greatest Buff Ever".

== See also ==
- Demographics of the Supreme Court of the United States
- John F. Kennedy Supreme Court candidates
- List of justices of the Supreme Court of the United States
- List of justices of the Supreme Court of the United States by court composition
- List of law clerks for the chief justice of the United States
- List of law clerks for the sixth seat of the Supreme Court of the United States
- List of NCAA major college football yearly rushing leaders
- List of NCAA major college football yearly scoring leaders
- List of NCAA major college football yearly total offense leaders
- List of United States Supreme Court cases by the Burger Court
- List of United States Supreme Court cases by the Rehnquist Court
- List of United States Supreme Court cases by the Warren Court
- List of United States Supreme Court justices by time in office
- List of United States federal judges by longevity of service

== Footnotes ==
Legal offices
Preceded by Lawrence Walsh	United States Deputy Attorney General; 1961–1962	Succeeded by Nick Katzenbach
Preceded by Charles Whittaker	Associate Justice of the Supreme Court of the United States; 1962–1993	Succeeded by Ruth Bader Ginsburg
