= Raymond Brescia =

American lawyer

Raymond H. Brescia
- Born: Long Island, New York, U.S.
- Education: Fordham University; Yale Law School
- Known for: Public interest law Civil procedure
- Scientific career
- Fields: Law
- Workplaces: Albany Law School

Raymond H. Brescia is an American lawyer, law professor, and legal scholar known for his work in public interest law, civil procedure, and legal education. He is currently a professor at Albany Law School. Brescia has extensive experience in public interest litigation, having worked with organizations such as the Legal Aid Society of New York and the Urban Justice Center.

With a background in political philosophy from Fordham University and a Juris Doctor from Yale Law School, Brescia has been involved in landmark legal cases, including Sale v. Haitian Centers Council. He has also clerked for Judge Constance Baker Motley.

In addition to his legal practice, Brescia is a prolific writer, contributing to law reviews and publications like The Huffington Post. At Albany Law School, he serves as the director of the Government Law Center.

== Education and early life ==
Brescia is the son of a salesman and school teacher from Huntington, New York. He graduated summa cum laude with a B.A. in political philosophy from Fordham University in 1989, where he was the recipient of the University President's Award for Community Service. He received a Juris Doctor from Yale Law School in 1992. While at Yale, he was part of the team of law students led by then professor Harold Hongju Koh that litigated Sale v. Haitian Centers Council and its related case. As a student, he received the Charles Albom Prize for Appellate Advocacy, and was Student Director of the Allard K. Lowenstein International Human Rights Law Clinic and the Homelessness Clinic.

== Public interest law ==
Upon graduation from law school, Brescia received one of a small number of Skadden Fellowship awards, through which he worked at the Legal Aid Society of New York as a staff attorney until 1995. From 1995 to 1996, he clerked for Constance Baker Motley who was then a federal judge sitting in the United States District Court for the Southern District of New York. At the conclusion of the clerkship, he returned to Legal Aid for an additional year. He spent the following year as a staff attorney at the New Haven Legal Assistance Association.

Brescia became associated with the Urban Justice Center in 1998, where he remained until 2007. While there, he served as associate director of the center, founded and directed the Community Development Project, and was project director of the Mental Health Project. He has been profiled in The New York Times for his work in public interest law.

== Academia ==
Brescia has taught nearly continuously since he was a student at Yale Law School. While a student, he was a visiting lecturer at Yale College. From 1997 through 2006, he served as an adjunct professor at New York Law School.

In 2007, Brescia became a full-time legal academic, joining the faculty of Albany Law School. Starting as a visiting professor of law, he was made an assistant professor in 2009. In 2012, he was awarded the Distinguished Educator for Excellence in Scholarship award. In 2011–2012, he was a visiting clinical associate professor of law at his alma mater, Yale Law School.

In 2013, Brescia was appointed director of Albany Law School's Government Law Center. The Government Law Center focuses on the legal aspects of current public policy issues, hosts a number of annual events and conferences, and is a publication vehicle for papers on numerous legal and governmental topics.

Brescia is a regular contributor to The Huffington Post on legal and political issues and maintains a blog entitled "The Future of Change. He has been consulted by The New York Times. He is the author of over a dozen law review articles. As of 2013, Westlaw searches for "Raymond H. Brescia" showed that his writings have been cited by both the federal courts and the courts of New York State, as well as in legal secondary sources over one hundred and fifty times.
