= David D. Siegel =

American law professor (1931-2014)

- Born: October 18, 1931; New York City, New York, U.S.
- Died: October 9, 2014 (aged 82); North Egremont, Massachusetts, U.S.
- Education: Brooklyn College; St. John's University School of Law; New York University School of Law
- Known for: New York civil practice, conflict of laws
- Scientific career
- Workplaces: Albany Law School
- Notable students: Patrick M. Connors; Michael J. Garcia

David D. Siegel (October 18, 1931 – October 9, 2014) was an American law professor and legal commentator.

== Education ==
Siegel had a B.A. from Brooklyn College, a J.D. from St. John's University School of Law, and an LL.M. from New York University School of Law.

== Publications ==
Siegel was the author of numerous works of legal commentary on the laws of the New York State. He is widely acknowledged to have been among the preeminent experts in the area of New York Civil Practice. He has been referred to by former New York Chief Judge Judith Kaye as the New York Court of Appeals' "favorite Master of the Art of Civil Practice." His writings are known for providing practical commentary to practicing attorneys, an art often lost in legal academic publications.

Siegel is best known for the legal treatise "New York Practice", a mainstay of legal libraries in New York. He is also the author of Siegel's Practice Commentaries, the New York State Law Digest, Conflict of Laws in a Nutshell, 3d. Edition, and numerous commentaries in McKinney's New York Laws and the United States Code Annotated. His commentaries have been cited in opinions issued by the United States Supreme Court and other federal appellate courts, as well as more than two hundred and fifty times by the New York Court of Appeals and over three thousand times by the trial level and intermediate appellate courts of New York State.

== Teaching and professional life ==
Siegel began teaching at Albany Law School in 1972 and retired from active teaching in 2007. Prior to and concurrent with his teaching at Albany, Siegel taught at St. John's University School of Law.

Seigel also served on several state legislative committees, drafting the New York City Civil Court Act, the Uniform Justice Court Act, the Uniform City Court Act, and the Uniform District Court Act.

For many years, Siegel also funded an annual scholarship for students participating in the editorial board of the Albany Law Review.

== Death ==
Siegel died at his home in North Egremont, Massachusetts on October 9, 2014, at the age of 82.
