= Joseph W. Bellacosa =

American judge (born 1937)

Joseph William Bellacosa

Associate Judge of the New York Court of Appeals
- In office January 5, 1987 – June 28, 2000
- Governor: Mario Cuomo; George Pataki
- Preceded by: Bernard S. Meyer
- Succeeded by: Victoria A. Graffeo

Personal details
- Born: September 1, 1937 (age 88) Winsted, Connecticut, United States
- Education: St. John's University (BA); St. John's University School of Law (JD)

Joseph William Bellacosa (born September 1, 1937) is an American lawyer and jurist who served as Chief Administrator of the Courts of New York from 1985 to 1987 and as a judge of the New York Court of Appeals, the highest court in the state, from 1987 to 2000.

== Early life and education ==
Born in Bedford–Stuyvesant, Brooklyn, Bellacosa's parents, Frank and Antoinette (Tullo) Bellacosa, were Italian immigrants.

Bellacosa attended the Brooklyn campus of the Cathedral College of the Immaculate Conception, graduating in 1957. He attended St. John's University, earning a B.A. in English in 1959, and then St. John's University School of Law, earning a LL.B in 1961.

== Career ==
From 1963 to 1970, Bellacosa worked as a law clerk to New York State Appellate Division Justice Marcus G. Christ. In 1970, Bellacosa returned to St. John's University as the assistant dean for academic and admissions affairs and as an assistant law professor. Then, from 1975 to 1983, he served as Clerk of the New York Court of Appeals, and from 1985 to 1987, he was Chief Administrator of the Courts. In April 1985, Bellacosa was appointed and confirmed to serve as a judge of the New York Court of Claims.

On January 5, 1987, Governor Mario Cuomo nominated Bellacosa to fill the seat of Justice Bernard S. Meyer on the New York Court of Appeals. Bellacosa served for 14 years, before retiring on June 28, 2000. A political independent, Bellacosa was noted for his conservative decision while serving on the bench, specifically in areas such as prosecutors' rights, and had a tendency to defer to the judiciary.

After retiring, Bellacosa became the Dean of his alma mater, the St. John's University School of Law, from July 2000 to August 2004.

== Personal life ==
In 1960, Bellacosa married Mary Theresa Nirrengarten. The two had three children: Michael, Peter, and Barbara.

== Legacy ==
Regarding Bellacosa's retirement, Professor Vincent M. Bonventre of the Albany Law School considered Bellacosa the most "outspoken and candid" member of the court, as well as the member who was the most "willing to go public in his dissents".

Political offices
| Preceded by Bernard S. Meyer | Judge of the New York Court of Appeals; 1987–2000 | Succeeded by Victoria A. Graffeo |
