= Albany Law Journal of Science and Technology =

- Discipline: Law
- Language: English
- Edited by: Savannah Everson

Publication details
- History: 1990-present
- Publisher: Albany Law School (United States)
- Frequency: Triannual

Standard abbreviations
- Bluebook: Alb. L.J. Sci. & Tech.
- ISO 4: Albany Law J. Sci. Technol.

Indexing
- ISSN: 1059-4280
- LCCN: 91658615
- OCLC no.: 23860428

Links
- Journal homepage

The Albany Law Journal of Science and Technology (Bluebook abbreviation: Alb. L.J. Sci. & Tech.) is a triannual law journal edited by students at Albany Law School. It was established in 1990 and covers legal issues involving science and technology. The journal also organizes an annual symposia.

== Membership ==
Members are students at Albany Law School. Students become eligible for journal membership upon completion of their first year of law school. Offers of membership are extended based on student class standing or on the results of a writing competition jointly administered by the school's three student-edited journals.

== Notable symposia ==
- Facebook Firing: The Intersection of Social Media, Employment, & Ethics (2013)
- Building a High-Tech, 21st Century Economy (2015)

== Past Editors-in-Chief ==
- Vol. 36 - John Rainey (2026)
- Vol. 35 - Savannah Everson (2025)
- Vol. 34 - Natalie Turney (2024)
- Vol. 33 - Claire Stratton (2023)
- Vol. 32 - Anneliese Aliasso (2022)
- Vol. 29 - Daniel Young (2019)
- Vol. 27 - Erin Ginty (2017)
- Vol. 26 - James Faucher II (2016)
- Vol. 25 - Gary J. Repke, Jr. (2015)
- Vol. 24 - Elizabeth A. Cappillino (2014)
- Vol. 23 - Nadia Isobel Arginteanu (2013)
- Vol. 22 - Christina M. French (2012)
- Vol. 21 - Caitlin Donovan (2011)
- Vol. 20 - Andrew Wilson (2010)
- Vol. 19 - William Q. Lowe (2009)

== See also ==
- Albany Government Law Review
- Albany Law Review
- Indian Journal of Law and Technology
