= List of Fordham University School of Law alumni =

This is a list of notable people associated with Fordham University School of Law in New York City, New York, organized into rough professional areas and listed in alphabetical order.

== Judges ==
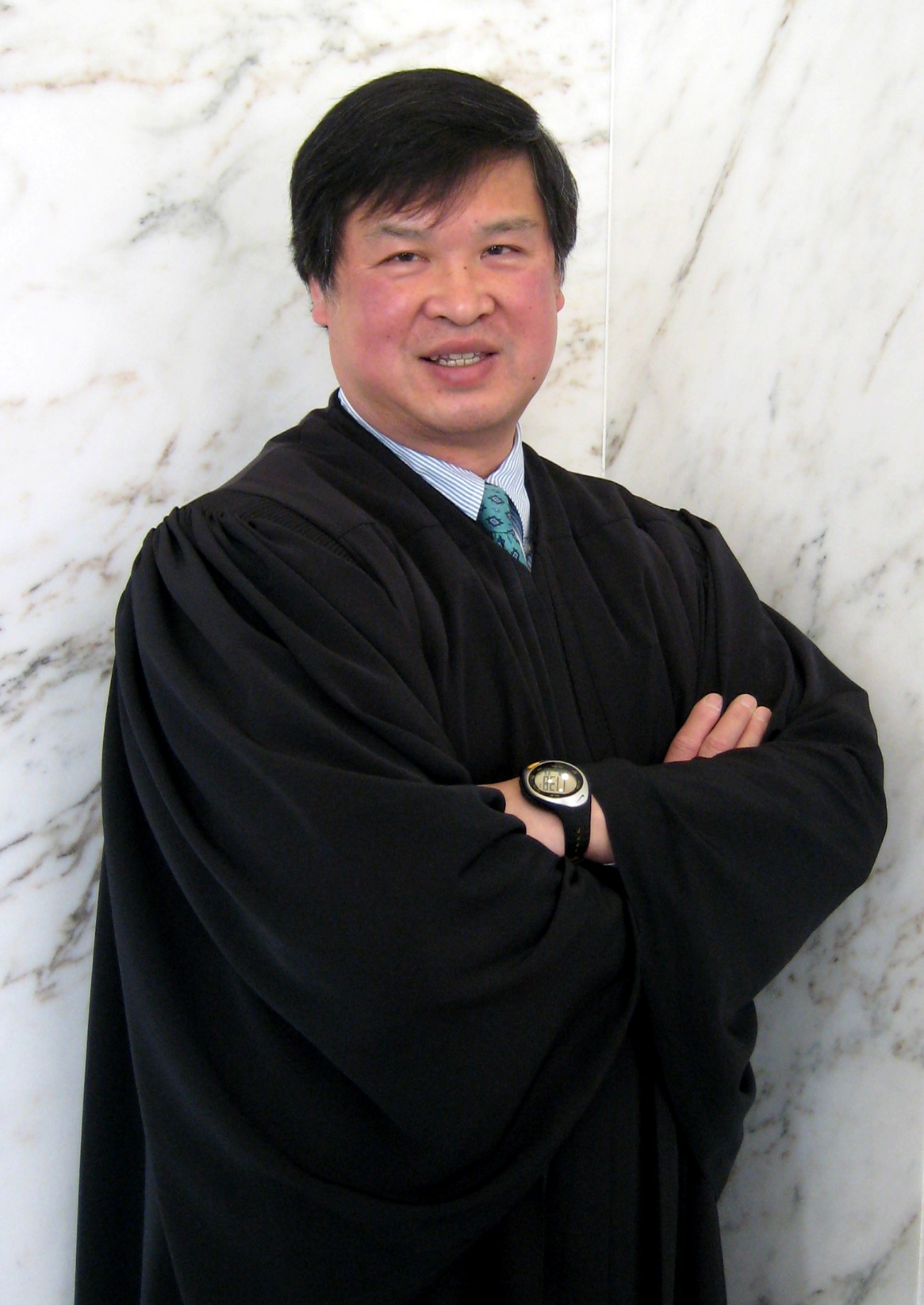
Judge Denny Chin

- Eileen Bransten '75, justice, New York Supreme Court
- Vincent L. Briccetti '80, judge, U.S. District Court for the Southern District of New York
- Thomas J. Brogan 1911, chief justice, Supreme Court of New Jersey
- Adrian P. Burke '30, associate judge, New York Court of Appeals
- John A. Byrnes 1923, chief justice, City Court
- James Kenneth Campbell, village justice of Saltaire, New York
- Claire C. Cecchi '89, judge, U.S. District Court for the District of New Jersey
- Denny Chin '78, judge, U.S. Court of Appeals for the Second Circuit
- Albert Conway 1911, chief judge, New York Court of Appeals
- Kevin Duffy '58, judge, U.S. District Court for the Southern District of New York
- Claire Eagan '76, chief judge, U.S. District Court for the Northern District of Oklahoma
- Peter T. Farrell '25, judge who presided over the trial of bank robber Willie Sutton
- Arthur Gonzalez '82, judge, U.S. Bankruptcy Court (1995–2012); presided over Chrysler, Enron and WorldCom bankruptcies
- Dennis Reagan Hurley '66, judge, U.S. District Court of the Eastern District of New York
- Irving Kaufman '31, chief judge, U.S. Court of Appeals for the Second Circuit
- John F. Keenan '54, judge, U.S. District Court for the Southern District of New York
- Paul Joseph Kelly, Jr. '67, judge, U.S. Court of Appeals for the Tenth Circuit
- Joseph M. McLaughlin '59, judge, U.S. Court of Appeals for the Second Circuit (1990–2013)
- Kevin Michael Moore '76, judge, U.S. District Court for the Southern District of Florida
- William Hughes Mulligan '42, judge, U.S. Court of Appeals for the Second Circuit (1971–1981)
- Marilyn Hall Patel '63, judge, U.S. District Court for the Northern District of California
- Loretta A. Preska '73, chief judge, U.S. District Court for the Southern District of New York
- Jaime Rios '77, judge, Queens County Supreme Court
- Cathy Seibel '85, judge, U.S. District Court for the Southern District of New York
- Anthony R. Suarez '93, judge of the New Jersey Superior Court, Bergen County, and former mayor of Ridgefield, New Jersey
- Thomas Glynn Walker 1924, judge of the United States District Court for the District of New Jersey, New Jersey assemblyman (1933–1938), judge of the New Jersey Court of Errors and Appeals (1937–1939), judge of the New Jersey Court of Common Pleas, Hudson County (1939)

== Politicians ==
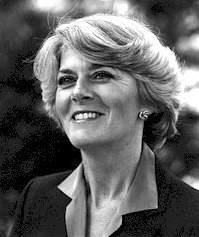
Rep. Geraldine Ferraro

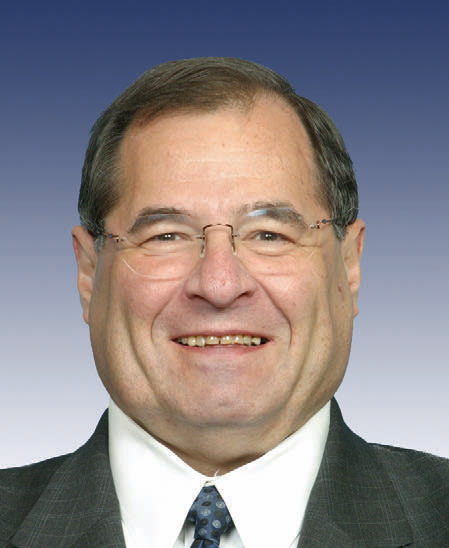
Rep. Jerrold Nadler

- Thomas Alfano '84, member of the New York State Assembly (1996–present)
- Vincent H. Auleta (1912), member of the New York State Assembly (1926–1930)
- Steve Bellone, '99, Babylon, New York town supervisor, Suffolk County executive
- Alessandra Biaggi '12, New York state senator (2019–2022)
- John Bonacic '68, New York state senator
- Kathleen Brown, California state treasurer and unsuccessful gubernatorial candidate
- Steven Derounian '42, member of the U.S. House of Representatives (1953–1965), justice, New York Supreme Court (1969–1981)
- Dan Donovan '88, member of the U.S. House of Representatives (2015–2019), Staten Island district attorney (2004–2015)
- Francis E. Dorn '35, member of the U.S. House of Representatives (1953–1961)
- Geraldine Ferraro '60, member of the U.S. House of Representatives (1979–1985); first woman vice presidential candidate of a major political party
- Joseph F. Finnegan '31, fourth director of the Federal Mediation and Conciliation Service, 1955–1961
- Vito Fossella '93, member of the U.S. House of Representatives (1997–2009)
- Peter Hatch '01, commissioner of the New York City Department of Consumer and Worker Protection
- Louis Heller '26, special deputy assistant attorney general, New York state senator, member of the United States Congress, judge of New York City Special Sessions Court, justice of New York City City Court, and judge on New York Supreme Court
- Joseph T. Higgins (1921), member of the New York State Assembly (1928–1932)
- Vincent R. Impellitteri '24, mayor of New York City (1950–1953)
- Andrew Lanza '92, New York state senator
- Louis J. Lefkowitz, '25, New York state attorney general, New York state assemblyman
- Ralph J. Marino '54, majority leader, New York State Senate (1988–1994)
- William C. McCreery (1919), American lawyer and member of the New York State Assembly
- Joseph McGoldrick (1929), NYC comptroller and NY State Residential Rent Control commissioner, lawyer, and professor
- Jerrold Nadler, '78, member of the U.S. House of Representatives (1993–present)
- Edward T. O'Connor, Jr., New Jersey state senator
- Bill Owens '74, member of the U.S. House of Representatives (2009–present)
- Cesar Perales '65, secretary of state of New York (2011–2016)
- Phelps Phelps '25, 38th governor of American Samoa and U.S. ambassador to the Dominican Republic
- Adam Clayton Powell IV, member of the New York State Assembly (2000–2010)
- Thomas Vincent Quinn '24, member of the U.S. House of Representatives (1949–1951)
- Norman M. Robertson, New Jersey state senator
- Holly Schepisi '97, New Jersey state senator
- William "Pat" Schuber '72, mayor of Bogota, New Jersey (1980–1984), New Jersey assemblyman (1982–1990), Bergen County executive (1991–2003), member of the Port Authority of New York and New Jersey Board of Commissioners (2011–2017)
- Bernard M. Shanley, deputy chief of staff and White House counsel to President Dwight Eisenhower
- Aravella Simotas '02, member of the New York State Assembly
- Madeline Singas, '91, district attorney, Nassau County, New York
- Dean Skelos '75, majority leader of the New York State Senate
- William F. Smith 1922, member of the New York State Assembly
- Thomas Suozzi, U.S. representative for New York's 3rd congressional district, former Nassau County executive and former 2006 New York gubernatorial candidate
- Austin Joseph Tobin '28, executive director of the Port of New York Authority, the precursor to the Port Authority of New York and New Jersey, 1942–1972
- Frank William Towey Jr. 1919, U.S. congressman from New Jersey's 12th congressional district (1937–1939)
- Joseph W. Tumulty, New Jersey state senator (1974–1978)
- Peter Vallone, Jr., member of the New York City Council (2002–2013), Judge of the New York Court of Claims (2017-present), Judge of the New York City Civil Court for Queens 3rd Municipal Court District
- Peter Vallone, Sr. '59, first and longtime speaker of the New York City Council
- Malcolm Wilson '36, governor of New York (1973–1975)

== Other legal practitioners ==
- Kristen Browde (2000), attorney and former journalist active in LGBTQ issues
- Raymond A. Brown, criminal defense lawyer who represented high-profile clients
- Eunice Carter, '32, first female African-American assistant district attorney for the state of New York, pivotal in the prosecution of Lucky Luciano
- Robert J. Cleary '80, U.S. attorney for the District of New Jersey and lead prosecutor in the Unabomber case
- Robert Stephan Cohen, '62, senior partner at Cohen Clair Lans Greifer & Thorpe LLP
- Janice Cole, '79, U.S. attorney for the Eastern District of North Carolina
- John Feerick, '61, dean, Fordham University School of Law (1982–2002)
- Christopher Ferrara, founder of the American Catholic Lawyers Association and contributing editor of The Remnant newspaper
- Marc Ferzan, '92, director, governor of New Jersey's Office of Recovery and Rebuilding
- Pat Foye, '81, former chairman and CEO, and president of the New York Metropolitan Transportation Authority (MTA) and executive director of the Port Authority of New York and New Jersey
- Ira Gollobin, civil rights attorney
- Matthew Hiltzik, attorney and PR consultant
- William G. Hundley, '50, criminal defense attorney who represented high-profile clients; former prosecutor in U.S. Justice Department
- Kei Komuro, attorney at Lowenstein Sandler; husband of former Japanese Princess Mako (Mako Komuro); received the Martin Scholarship in 2019
- Askold Lozynskyj, '76, president of the Ukrainian World Congress (1998–2008)
- Shana Madoff, '95, compliance officer and attorney at securities firm of Ponzi schemer Bernard Madoff
- William R. Meagher, '27, senior partner at the law firm Skadden, Arps, Slate, Meagher & Flom
- John N. Mitchell, '38, U.S. attorney general (1969–1972)
- Archibald R. Murray, '60, first African-American president, New York State Bar Association; commissioner, Division of Criminal Justice Services; attorney-in-chief, Legal Aid Society
- Finbarr O'Neill, '76, former CEO of J.D. Power, Mitsubishi Motors North America, Hyundai Motor America
- Eliza Orlins, '08, Legal Aid public defender, Survivor contestant, 2021 Manhattan district attorney candidate
- Thomas Puccio, '69, Abscam prosecutor and defense attorney for Claus von Bülow
- Andrew Ruotolo '78, county prosecutor of Union County, New Jersey (1992–1995), unsuccessfully ran for New Jersey General Assembly in 1985
- Brian Steel, '90, defense attorney for Young Thug (2022) and Sean Combs (2025)
- Ruth Whitehead Whaley, '24, first female African-American lawyer admitted in New York (1924)
- Franklin H. Williams, '45, assistant attorney general of California, U.S. delegate to UNESCO and the United Nations Economic and Social Council, U.S. ambassador to Ghana

== Sports ==
- Jessica Berman, '02, commissioner of the National Women's Soccer League
- Bud Culloton, professional baseball player
- Bernie Fliegel, '38, professional basketball player
- Vincent Fuller, former American football player and current attorney
- John Mara, '79, president and COO, New York Giants
- Bob Olin, boxer, World Light Heavyweight champion
- Walter O'Malley, '30, owner of the Brooklyn Dodgers; moved the team from Brooklyn to Los Angeles
- Howie Roseman, general manager of the Philadelphia Eagles

== Other ==
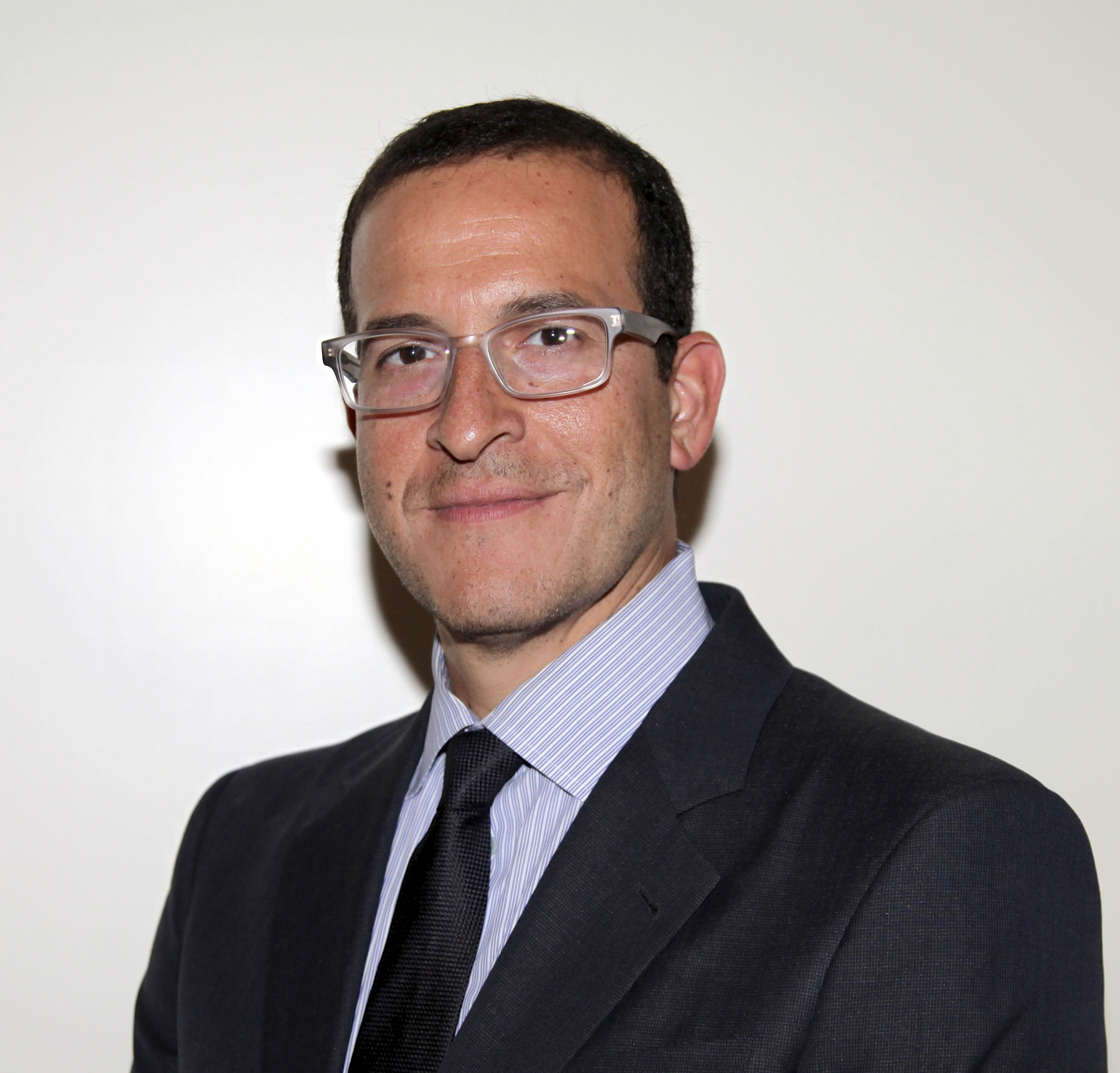
Doug Davis

- Fred Ahlert, composer and songwriter
- Kevin Burke, '77, chairman, president, and CEO of Consolidated Edison
- Christopher Cuomo, '95, Emmy Award-winning correspondent formerly for CNN and ABC News; news anchor, New Day
- Doug Davis, '97, entertainment lawyer, Grammy Award-winning producer and philanthropist
- Jack Ford, co-anchor of Court TV's Banfield & Ford: Courtside, Peabody Award and two-time Emmy Award winner
- Jim Gianopulos, '76, co-chairman and CEO of Fox Filmed Entertainment
- Matthew Hiltzik, '97, CEO and president of Hiltzik Strategies, a strategic consulting and communications firm
- John N. Irwin II, U.S. deputy secretary of state, U.S. ambassador to France
- Thomas J. Kelly, '62, United States Army soldier and a recipient of the Congressional Medal of Honor, the US military's highest decoration, for his actions in World War II
- Brian William Koppelman, '95, filmmaker, screenwriter
- Pouya Lavian, Appointed Deputy Chief of Staff for Policy at Environmental Protection Agency for AI Infrastructure and Cyber, banker and technologist
- G. Gordon Liddy, '57, Watergate conspirator, nationally syndicated radio talk show host
- Lara Jill Miller, '91, actress, best known for her role as Samantha "Sam" Kanisky on the TV sitcom Gimme a Break!
- Sinna Nasseri, Iranian-American photographer
- I. India Thusi, law professor at Indiana University Bloomington
- Webster B. Todd, construction architect/engineer, New Jersey Republican Party chair (1961–1969 and 1974–1976), father of Governor of New Jersey Christine Todd Whitman
- Mike Mazurki, Actor
