= Leslie Stein =

American judge (born 1956)

Leslie E. Stein

Associate Judge of the New York Court of Appeals
- In office February 9, 2015 – June 4, 2021
- Appointed by: Andrew Cuomo
- Preceded by: Victoria A. Graffeo
- Succeeded by: Madeline Singas

Associate Justice of Third Judicial Department
- In office February 2008 – February 2015
- Appointed by: Eliot Spitzer

Justice on the New York Supreme Court, Third Judicial District
- In office January 2002 – January 2008

Albany City Court Judge
- In office January 1997 – January 2002

Personal details
- Born: 1956 (age 69–70) New York, U.S.
- Education: Macalester College; Albany Law School

Leslie E. Stein (born 1956) is a former judge on New York State's Court of Appeals. Stein was appointed to the court by Governor Andrew Cuomo in late 2014, and was confirmed by the New York State Senate on February 9, 2015.

== Early life ==
The daughter of two law school graduates, Stein grew up in the Capital District of New York.

She graduated from Macalester College, with Phi Beta Kappa honors. She started law school at the Minnesota Law School, and after her first year, transferred to Albany Law School for her last two years, when she earned her Juris Doctor in 1981, and was ranked second in her class.

== Legal career ==
Stein worked in a paid legal internship during her last year at Albany Law. After law school, Stein first worked as a law clerk at Schenectady County Family Court.

She was in private practice for almost 14 years, starting as an associate and later a partner, at the Albany, New York law firm of McNamee, Lochner, Titus & Willams. She re-entered government service as an Albany City court judge in early 1997.

Stein served on the Albany Law School board of trustees.

In September 2019, Stein was nominated as Director of the Government Law Center at Albany Law School and started the role full-time in January 2022.

== State judicial service ==
=== New York Supreme Court, Appellate Division ===
She was elected to the State Supreme Court, Third Judicial District in 2001, and started her service on that trial bench on January 1, 2002. She was appointed, in February 2008, to fill a vacancy as an associate justice of the Appellate Division of the Supreme Court, Third Judicial Department. (Eliot Spitzer was the Governor at the time, a month before he resigned.)

=== New York Court of Appeals ===
Governor Cuomo nominated Stein to the New York Court of Appeals in late 2014. Judge Victoria A. Graffeo applied to the New York State Commission on Judicial Nominations to be considered for appointment to a second term. The Commission included Graffeo on its list of seven candidates for the position, but Governor Andrew Cuomo declined to reappoint Graffeo and instead selected Justice Stein for the position. Stein's nomination was confirmed by the New York State Senate on February 9, 2015.

In November 2020, Stein announced her plans to retire effective June 4, 2021.

== See also ==
- List of Jewish American jurists

Legal offices
Preceded by Victoria A. Graffeo	Associate Judge of the New York Court of Appeals; 2015–2021	Succeeded by Madeline Singas
