= Barbara A. Perry =

American academic

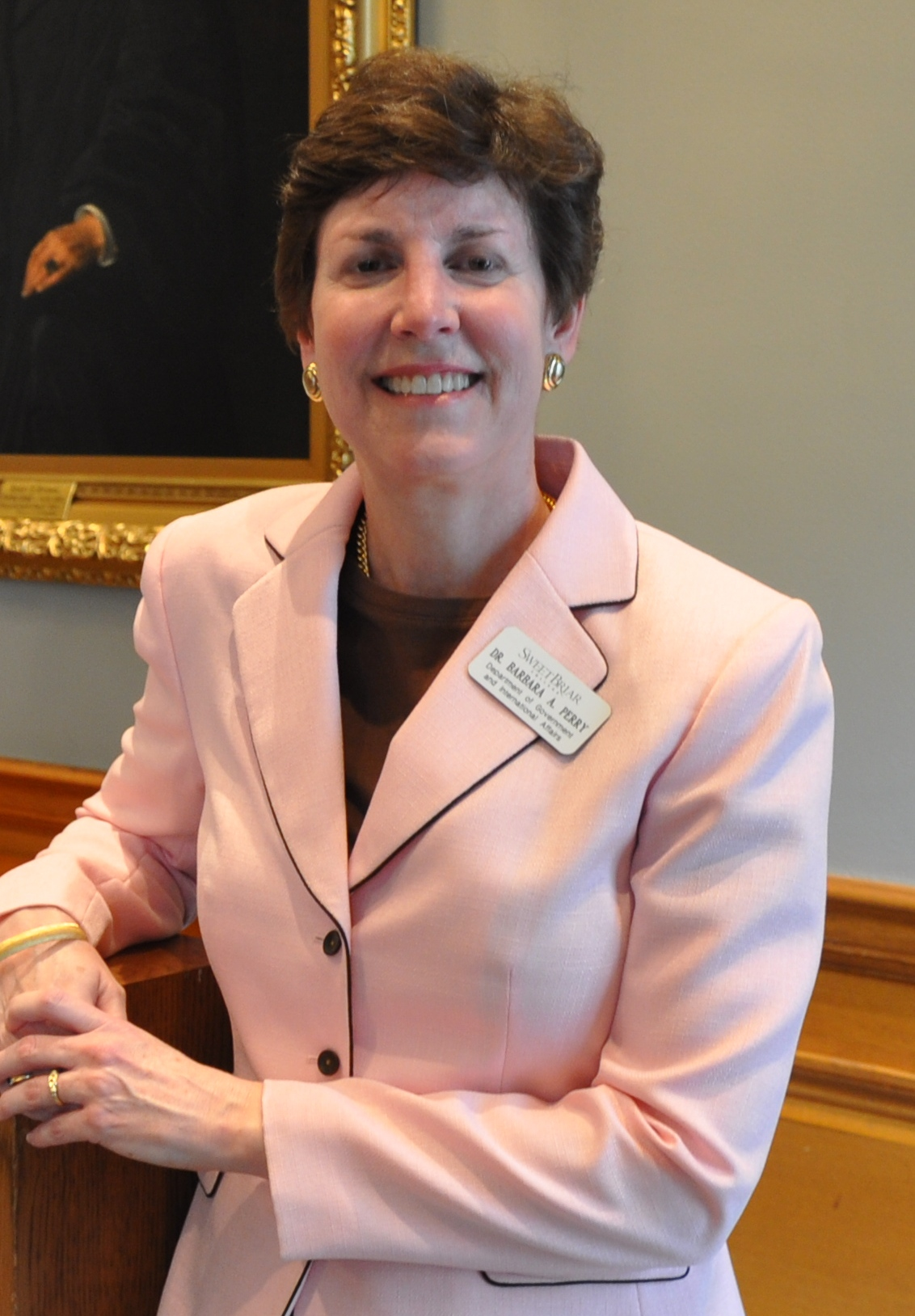
- Barbara Perry at the U.S. Supreme Court attending award ceremony for Justice Ruth Bader Ginsburg, June 29, 2009.
- Born: Louisville, KY, U.S.
- Occupations: Professor, Author
- Website: https://millercenter.org/experts/barbara-perry

Barbara Ann Perry is a presidency and U.S. Supreme Court expert, as well as a biographer of the Kennedys. She is also the J. Wilson Newman Professor in Presidential Studies at the University of Virginia's Miller Center, where she co-chairs the Presidential Oral History Program. As an oral historian, Perry has conducted more than 160 interviews for the George H. W. Bush, Bill Clinton, George W. Bush, Barack Obama, Donald Trump, and Joe Biden Presidential Oral History Projects and directed the Edward Kennedy Oral History Project.

== Early life and education ==
Perry was born in Louisville, Kentucky.

Perry earned a Bachelor of Arts degree in Political Science from University of Louisville, a Master of Arts degree in Politics, Philosophy, and Economics from Hertford College, Oxford, and a Ph.D. in American government from the University of Virginia.

== Career ==
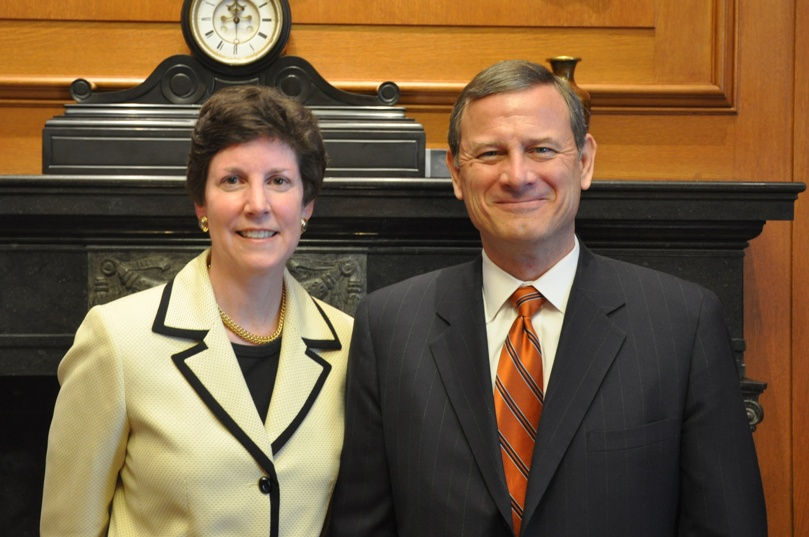
Perry with Chief Justice John G. Roberts in his chambers. Chief Justice Roberts introduced Perry's lecture at the U.S. Supreme Court, April 20, 2010.

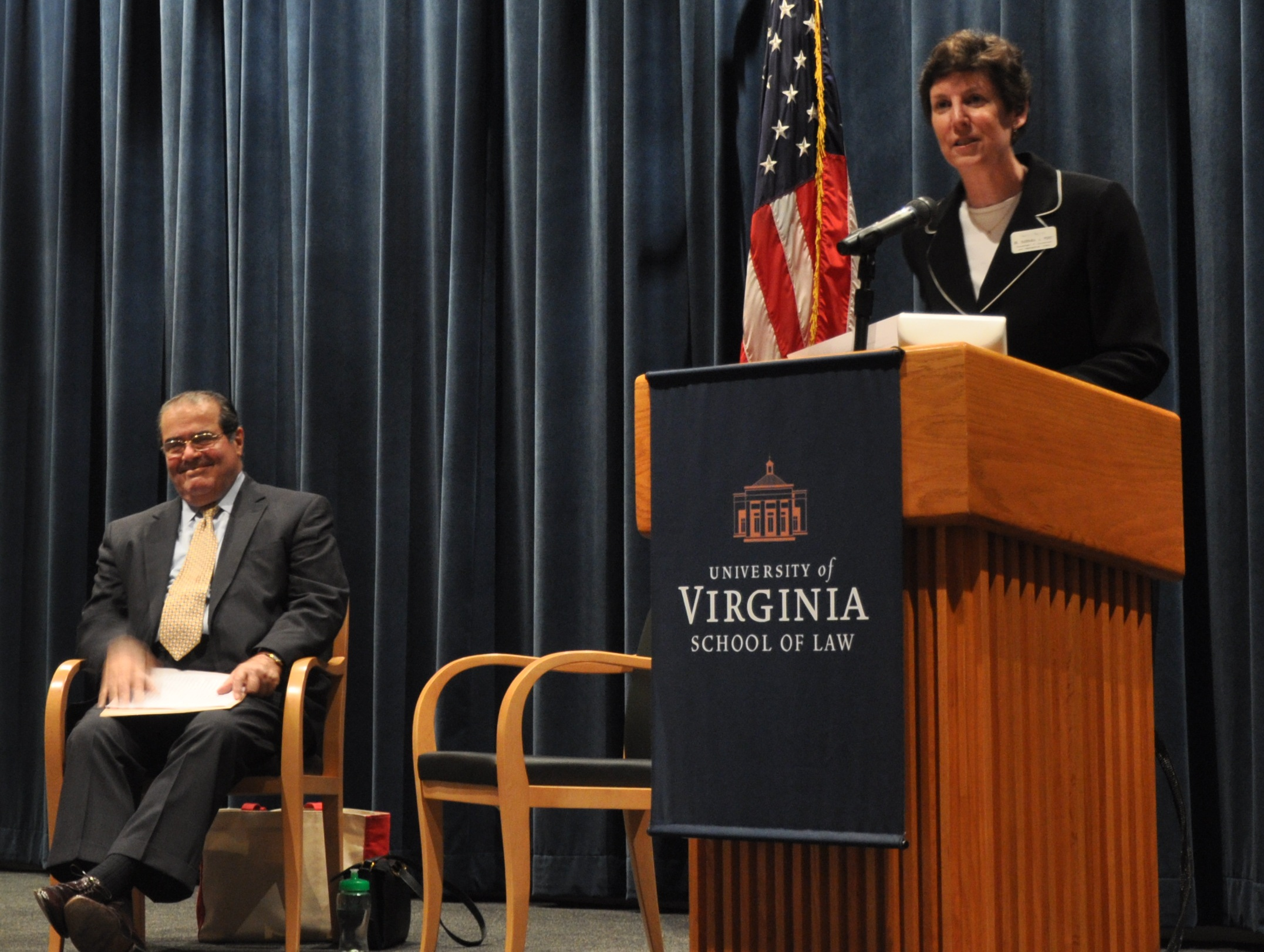
Perry introduces Justice Antonin Scalia at the Henry Abraham lecture at the University of Virginia Law School on April 16, 2010.

From 1989 to 2010 Perry was a member of the Department of Government at Sweet Briar College, where she became the Carter Glass Professor and established the Center for Civic Renewal. She served as the 1994-95 Judicial Fellow at the U.S. Supreme Court.

Perry assisted the Chief Justice in researching and writing speeches and provided briefings for hundreds of foreign dignitaries from around the world. In 2006-07 she served as a Senior Fellow at the McConnell Center at the University of Louisville and remains a Non-Resident Fellow there.

Perry is the J. Wilson Newman Professor in Presidential Studies at the University of Virginia's Miller Center. She is the Co-chair of Presidential Oral History Program.

Perry has authored or edited 17 books and has lectured to public audiences across the country, in the UK and Ireland, and in numerous teacher institutes, sponsored by the Supreme Court Summer Institute, Street Law, and the Gilder Lehrman Institute of American History. She also served as an adjunct professor at the Federal Executive Institute in Charlottesville, Virginia, and provided seminars for the Aspen Institute and the New York Historical Society. Her topics have included Supreme Court appointments, John F. Kennedy, the presidency, political leadership, First Ladies, the Kennedy family, and civil rights and liberties.

Perry is a member of the Board of Directors of the White House Historical Association, the Supreme Court Historical Society, the John F. Kennedy Presidential Library Foundation Advisory Board, and the Friends of the John F. Kennedy National Historical Site. She chairs the Steering Committee for the Henry J. Abraham Distinguished Lecture, held each year at the University of Virginia.

Perry frequently provides political analysis of and historical context for current public affairs to media outlets throughout the nation and the world, appearing as a quoted expert in newspaper features, providing radio and television interviews, and writing op-eds. She regularly contributes to the University of Virginia's blog, “Thoughts from the Lawn.”

== Works ==
- A "Representative" Supreme Court? The Impact of Race, Religion, and Gender on Appointments (Greenwood 1991) ISBN 9780313277771
- The Priestly Tribe: The Supreme Court's Image in the American Mind (Praeger 1999; winner of a 2001 Choice Award) ISBN 978-0275965990
- Freedom and the Court: Civil Rights and Liberties in the United States, 8th edition (with Henry J. Abraham, University Press of Kansas 2003) ISBN 0700612629
- Jacqueline Kennedy: First Lady of the New Frontier (University Press of Kansas 2004) ISBN 978-0700613434
- The Michigan Affirmative Action Cases (University Press of Kansas 2007) ISBN 978-0700615490
- The Supremes: An Introduction to the United States Supreme Court Justices, 2nd ed. (Peter Lang 2009) ISBN 978-0820495484
- Rose Kennedy: The Life and Times of a Political Matriarch (W.W. Norton 2013) ISBN 978-0393349467
- 41: Inside the Presidency of George H.W. Bush (edited with Michael Nelson; Cornell University Press 2014) ISBN 978-0801479274
- 42: Inside the Presidency of Bill Clinton (edited with Michael Nelson and Russell Riley; Cornell University Press 2016) ISBN 978-0801456893
- Edward Kennedy: An Oral History (Oxford University Press, 2019) ISBN 978-0190644840

== Awards ==
- 1994-1995 Supreme Court Fellows’ Tom C. Clark Award.
- 2012 Scholar Award in Political Science. Presented by Virginia Social Science Association.
- 2013 Silver Good Citizenship Medal. Presented by The Sons of American Revolution, Virginia Society.
- 2014 Alumni Fellow. Presented by University of Louisville College of Arts & Sciences. (October 16, 2014)
