= Patrick Connors =

American lawyer

Patrick M. Connors
- Born: New York City
- Education: Chaminade High School; Georgetown University; St. John's University School of Law
- Known for: New York Civil Practice, Legal Ethics
- Scientific career
- Workplaces: Albany Law School

Patrick M. Connors is an American law professor and legal commentator.

== Education & Early career ==
A graduate of Chaminade High School, Professor Connors earned a B.A. from Georgetown University in 1985 and a Juris Doctor from St. John's University School of Law in 1988. While at St. John's, Connors was a member of the editorial board of the St. John's Law Review and a research assistant to David D. Siegel.

After graduating from law school, Connors clerked for New York Court of Appeals Judge Richard D. Simons for three years before joining the Syracuse, New York law firm of Hancock & Estabrook. During Connors nine years with the firm he was also an adjunct professor at Syracuse University School of Law.

== Writing ==
Connors joined the faculty of Albany Law School in 2000. He received tenure in 2006. In 2011 he was awarded the faculty award for Excellence in Service.

Connors' writings focus on providing practical commentary to attorneys, primarily those who practice in the state of New York. He is best known for his numerous practice commentaries in McKinney's New York Laws and his regular columns on Legal Ethics and New York Civil Practice in the New York Law Journal. His writings have been cited in opinions issued by the New York Court of Appeals seven times and by the other courts of New York State more than ninety times. He is also the author of nine law review articles.

Connors has also taken over writing the widely used legal treatise New York Practice. The publication had been authored by David D. Siegel since its creation in 1978.

== Professional Activities ==
Professor Connors is an active member of the New York State Bar Association. Most notably he has served as the Reporter on the Task Force on Nonlawyer Ownership and the Special Committee to Review the Code of Judicial Conduct. He has also served as Reporter on the New York State Committee on Pattern Jury Instructions and as Chair of the New York State Racing and Wagering Board's Racing Fan Advisory Counsel. More recently, Professor Connors has been engaged by litigation workflow systems provider American LegalNet to publish articles on New York civil practice, Federal practice and general risk management practices within law firms.
