= Albany Government Law Review =

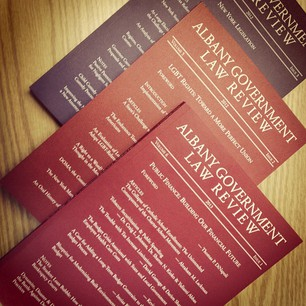
- Discipline: Law
- Language: English
- Edited by: Claudia Cadenillas

Publication details
- History: 2007-present
- Publisher: Albany Law School (United States)
- Frequency: Biannual
- Open access: Yes

Standard abbreviations
- Bluebook: Alb. Gov't L. Rev.
- ISO 4: Albany Gov. Law Rev.

Indexing
- ISSN: 2328-2975 (print); 2328-3033 (web)
- LCCN: 2008250055
- OCLC no.: 196429571

Links
- Journal homepage; Online archive

The Albany Government Law Review is a biannual student-edited law review at Albany Law School. It covers legal aspects of government and public policy. The journal hosts a symposium each year. In 2011 and 2012, the journal published a third issue focused on New York legislation.

== History ==
The Albany Government Law Review replaced the Environmental Outlook Journal in the 2007–2008 academic year.

== Editors-in-chief ==
The following persons have been editor-in-chief of the journal:

- Monique F. Mazza (2007–2008)
- Molly Adams Breslin (2008–2009)
- Benjamin L. Loefke (2009–2010)
- Robert S. Barrows (2010–2011)
- Andrew M. Stengel (2011–2012)
- Katie Valder (2012–2013)
- Heath Hardman (2013–2014)
- Michael LiPetri (2014–2015)
- Christopher D. Acosta (2015-2016)
- Brenda T. Baddam (2016-2017)
- Gabriella A. Romero (2017-2018)
- Claudia C. Cadenillas (2018-2019)
- Gianna R. Fernandez (2019-2020)
- Andrew D. Ellis (2020-2021)
- Kristen A. Davis (2021-2022)
- Kyle Pittman (2022-2023)
- Sarah Coon (2023-2024)
- Caroline Drenkard (2024-2025)
- Konrad Dalland (2025-2026)

== See also ==
- Albany Law Journal of Science and Technology
