= Vincent Martin Bonventre =

American law professor

- Born: 1948 (age 77–78); Brooklyn, New York
- Education: Union College (BS); University of Virginia (MA, PhD); Brooklyn Law School (JD)
- Known for: Constitutional law
- Scientific career
- Fields: Law, government
- Institutions: Albany Law School

Vincent Martin Bonventre is an American legal scholar.

== Education ==
Bonventre received his B.S. from Union College in 1972 where he studied electrical engineering and chemistry.

Bonventre received a Juris Doctor in 1976 from Brooklyn Law School where he was active in the Moot Court Honor Society and the International Law Society. He received the Phi Alpha Delta International Legal Fraternity scholarship and won American Jurisprudence Awards, including one for Criminal Procedure, which has since been an area of his concentration.

He attended graduate school at the University of Virginia, earning a Master of Arts in public administration in 1981 and a Ph.D. in government in 2003, studying under Henry J. Abraham and David M. O'Brien. His doctoral dissertation focused on discerning the ideological views of judges based on their voting patterns, a theme that would continue throughout his later scholarship. While a PhD student, he was appointed Acting Assistant Professor of Government and taught courses in constitutional law and history.

== Career ==
From 1970 to 1973, Bonventre served in the United States Army, earning a commission from Officers Candidate School at Fort Benning. He was assigned to Fort Huachuca, where he taught on the faculty of the Army Intelligence Center and School. After earning law school, Bonventre returned to the Army in 1977 as criminal trial counsel in the Judge Advocate General's Corps. While there he held the offices of Chief of Prosecution and Chief of Defense. Bonventre would serve in the JAG Corps until 1980.

Starting in 1983, Bonventre began clerking at the New York Court of Appeals. He clerked for Judge Matthew J. Jasen from 1983 to 1985 and Judge Stewart F. Hancock Jr. in 1986, and again from 1987 to 1990. In between his clerkships, he was a Supreme Court of the United States Judicial Fellow, having been selected by then Chief Justice Warren Burger and the Judicial Fellows Commission.

=== Academia ===
Bonventre is the Justice Robert H. Jackson Distinguished Professor at Albany Law School. He joined the faculty of Albany Law School in 1990 as an assistant professor. At the end of that first academic year, he was appointed faculty advisor of the Albany Law Review, a position which he still holds. In 1996, he added the State Constitutional Commentary issue to that publication, serving as its professional editor. In 1993 he was made an associate professor, and in 1996 granted tenure and made a professor of law.

Bonventre has also taught as a visiting professor at the Syracuse University College of Law and the Maxwell School of Citizenship and Public Affairs.

In 1999, Bonventre founded the Government Law and Policy Journal, a publication of the New York State Bar Association. He served as editor-in-chief of that publication until 2005. In 2002, Bonventre founded the Center for Judicial Process, a non-profit organization devoted to studying judicial decision-making and other judicial issues. The center went online in 2010 and Bonventre remains its director. Since 2008, Bonventre has maintained a regular blog, New York Court Watcher, which focuses on developments related to the New York Court of Appeals and United States Supreme Court. In 2011, he founded and became director of International Law Studies, a forum for the publication of international and comparative law scholarship.

His scholarship has been cited by the United States District Court for the Eastern District of New York and the Wyoming Supreme Court.

He is listed in Who's Who in America and Who's Who in American Law, and others.
