= Government Law Center =

Center at Albany Law School, New York, US

- Founded at: Albany Law School
- Type: nonpartisan law and public policy center
- Purpose: immigration law state constitutions aging and disability law access to justice in rural communities police oversight.
- Location: Albany, New York
- Website: www.albanylaw.edu/government-law-center

The Government Law Center at Albany Law School is a nonpartisan law and public policy center based in Albany, New York. It produces independent legal research and analysis to help state and local governments better serve their communities.

The center currently focuses on several core topics: state and local involvement in immigration law; state constitutions; aging and disability law; access to justice in rural communities; and police oversight.

The GLC prepares students for careers as attorneys in public service though the GLC Fellowship Program, a select opportunity for a small number of applicants from each class.

Capitalizing on its location in the capital of New York State, the center explores emerging issues and connects with government officials through the annual Warren M. Anderson Legislative Breakfast Series and the Edwin L. Crawford Memorial Lecture in Municipal Law, as well as other programs.

The Honorable Leslie E. Stein served as Director of the GLC from January of 2022 until her retirement in the summer of 2024.

Patrick Wildes, an attorney, Albany Law School alum, and former Assistant Secretary to Governor Kathy Hochul for Human Services and Mental Hygiene, has served as Director since January 2025. (https://www.albanylaw.edu/government-law-center/news/patrick-wildes-16-former-human-services-leader-ny-governors-office-lead)

== Mission ==
The principal aim of the center's work is to serve as a resource for governments and, by helping governments inform themselves about the law, to promote their ability to serve their communities. While the GLC has special expertise on governments in New York State, its research aims to have a nationwide impact. The GLC has a nonpartisan identity and does not participate in advocacy on disputed policy issues. Central to its mission is training skilled lawyers and future leaders in the legal profession. Connecting the law school to the community is a key part of the center's mission as well.

== Core topics ==
State and local immigration law. The Government Law Center publishes explainers—short policy papers—designed to help policymakers and others understand the complex laws that apply to state and local governments' choices about immigration policy.

State constitutional law and history. The center produces legal research and analysis on the role, powers, and structure of state and local government as determined by state constitutions; additional protections and rights recognized by state constitutions not found in federal law; and the history of constitutional provisions.

Aging and disabilities law. Established as part of the GLC in 1994, the Institute for Aging and Disabilities Law focuses on local, state, and national topics of specific concern to older adults and individuals with disabilities. The GLC's Edgar '46 & Margaret Sandman Fellowship in Aging and Health Law and Policy is awarded to Albany Law School students to research emerging issues in aging or health law and policy, and the findings are disseminated to lawmakers and policymakers nationwide.

== Programs and initiatives ==
GLC Fellowship program. Launched in 2015, the program includes substantive preparation for public-service practice, creating a sense of community for students interested in public service, and connecting students to attorneys in public-private practice.

Warren M. Anderson '40 Legislative Breakfast Series. Held monthly during the New York State Legislative Session, each program features a panel of experts who address legal aspects of a policy issue pending before the State Legislature. The Series was created in 1992 and named after the former Majority Leader of the New York State Senate.

Edwin L. Crawford Lecture on Municipal Law. Endowed in 1996 to honor the memory of the former Executive Director of the New York State Association of Counties, the Lecture is delivered by a government official or another individual who is accomplished in an issue of interest to local government officials.

The Rural Law Initiative. Funded by the USDA, this pilot program brings legal assistance to small businesses in rural Upstate New York.

Citizens Police Review Board. The GLC coordinated reporting and training for this independent body established by the City of Albany to improve communication between the police and the community until the end of 2024.

Center for Continuing Legal Education. The GLC, through this accredited provider, grants Continuing Legal Education credits for alumni and other attorneys attending programs at Albany Law School and at other locations.

Government-Lawyer-in-Residence Program. Retired government experts volunteer at the GLC to mentor students, write on specialized topics, assist with municipal government projects, and oversee law-related events.

== History ==
The Government Law Center was founded in 1978, the product of a grant initiated at the federal level and administered by New York State through the New York State Department of State, under the leadership of Mario M. Cuomo as then-secretary of state. Cuomo worked with Albany Law School professors Sandra Stevenson and Bernard Harvith to secure a grant through the United States Office of Personnel Management and the United States Civil Service Commission.

Professor Sandra Stevenson served as the GLC's director for a few months before J. Langdon Marsh became the first full-time director of the GLC on March 1, 1979 The center contracted with the New York State Department of Environmental Conservation to prepare its first state legal report in 1980, titled "Selected Legal Problems in the Control of Hazardous Wastes." The center proceeded to enter into contracts with several New York State agencies, including the New York State Department of Social Services, Adirondack Park Agency, New York State Department of State, New York State Department of Health, and with the New York State Legislature, to produce reports and offer training. Under Marsh's direction, the center also focused on issues related to hazardous waste, zoning and planning, environmental quality review, economic development, and local government.

Marsh left the center in July 1983, and for a brief time following, Joseph W. Bellacosa served as the center's director. He subsequently was appointed by then-New York State governor Mario M. Cuomo to serve as a judge on the Court of Claims and chief administrative judge of all state courts, followed by a fourteen-year term on the New York Court of Appeals. In 1983, Professor Sandra M. Stevenson was re-appointed associate dean and director of the Government Law Center, assuming the position she had held in the first months of the center's existence. During her tenure, the GLC conducted training programs in alternative dispute resolution (ADR) and tying ADR to intellectual property. Under Stevenson's leadership in 1989, Albany Law School and the Government Law Center became the official repository for tapes of oral arguments heard before the New York Court of Appeals. In 1990, Professor George F. Carpinello was appointed director. Under Carpinello, the center introduced the Warren M. Anderson Legislative Breakfast Seminar Series, a series focused on topics of interest to legislators and policy makers, named for the former president pro llTem and Majority Leader of the New York State Senate. The GLC also began producing a newsletter for the County Attorneys Association of New York State (CAASNY), prepared the first edition of Legal Careers in New York State Government (with later editions published by the New York State Bar Association), and placed student interns in the counsel's office of various state agencies.

Patricia E. Salkin, Raymond and Ella Smith Distinguished Professor of Law and associate dean of Albany Law School, was appointed director of the GLC in 1992, and served as the center's director until her appointment as dean of the Touro College Jacob D. Fuchsberg Law Center in 2012. In the first years under Salkin's leadership, the GLC began the Edgar and Margaret Sandman Fellowship in Aging and Health Law, and created the Senior Citizen's Law Day, a day-long program providing local seniors with free seminars on important issues related to aging. The Aging Law and Policy Program was established in 1994 to focus on issues related to aging.

In 1994, the GLC also received funding through the United States Department of Education to create the Mediation Assistance Program to train and state-certify law and non-law students as volunteer mediators for New York's Community Dispute Settlement Program, leading to the establishment of the Program on Public Policy Dispute Resolution to focus on issues emerging in this field.

In the years that followed, a number of additional programs were initiated. The Lawrence F. Klepper Legal Assistance Program for Non-Profit Organizations, helping to place law students with attorneys who provide pro bono or very low-cost services to nonprofits, was established at the GLC in 1994 by friends of the former Executive Director of the Legal Aid Society and with the support of Congregation Beth Emeth. The Edwin L. Crawford Memorial Lecture in Municipal Law was launched in 1996 to address issues of state and national importance to municipal officials. In 1998, the GLC's Government Law Network began as a way for people working in or with government to meet key law and policy makers at exclusive "Networking Breakfast" forums. The center's Alumni Leaders in Government Networking Series provided students with an opportunity to interact with notable Albany Law School graduates.

In 1999, the GLC together with the Albany Law Clinic and Justice Center established the Semester in Government Program, offering students full-time internships in government counsel offices in Albany and Washington, D.C. The center also began producing The Government Law & Policy Journal for the New York State Bar Association's Committee on Attorneys in Public Service.

In 2000, the GLC started providing services for the City of Albany's newly created Citizen's Police Review Board, established by a law calling upon an academic institution to support the oversight of law enforcement. The GLC moved to its new location on the Albany Law School campus in 2001. The same year, the center hosted the annual "Saratoga Institute on Racing and Gaming Law" as part of its Program on Racing and Gaming Law. The center also received funding from the United States Department of Housing and Urban Development to expand mediation services for area housing communities.

In 2002, the GLC and Squire, Sanders and Dempsey began sponsoring the William B. Sanders Law and Public Policy Forum. New York State officials such as former Governor David A. Paterson, then Attorney General Eliot Spitzer, and Assembly Speaker Sheldon Silver have participated. The Government Lawyer in Residence program at the GLC was established in 2002 to give the center and law students the resources of a former government attorney.

The GLC also produced a new edition of the Manual for Administrative Law Judges and Hearing Officers published by the New York State Department of Civil Service; a conference on the 30th anniversary of the Adirondack Park; New York's first conference on "smart growth"; a program to mark the 25th anniversary of the State Environmental Quality Review Act; and a symposium on siting new power plants in New York.

The GLC hosted the inaugural Nancy M. Sills '76 Memorial Lecture, featuring then-Lieutenant Governor Mary O. Donohue, at the 10th Annual Senior Citizen's Law Day in 2003. The Summer in Government was also introduced as a way to provide students with internship placements with government lawyers in Albany.

In 2004 the GLC, in partnership with public television station WMHT, produced "Inside the Inner Circle," focused on the process of state policymaking, featuring former counsels to five New York governors. In 2005 the center introduced graduate and post-graduate fellowships for law and policy research and a faculty affiliate program to augment its research capability. Historian and scholar Paul Finkelman was named Senior Faculty Fellow at the GLC and Albany Law School's President William McKinley Distinguished Professor of Law and Public Policy. The Clarence D. "Rapp" Rappleyea Government Lawyer in Residence Program was established to recognize the former State Assembly Minority Leader.

In 2005–2007, the GLC took on a number of new projects: a series of procurement law initiatives to help improve New York State's procurement process and identify potential areas of reform in the 1995 Procurement Stewardship Act; providing technical assistance related to consolidations, mergers, dissolutions, cooperative agreements and shared services as part of the Shared Municipal Services Incentive (SMSI) Grant Program, under a contract with the New York State Department of State; establishing a Non-Profit Legal Assistance Program with the assistance of then-U.S. Congressman Michael R. McNulty; and the establishment of the Public Authorities Project, to provide research on legal aspects of public policy issues facing public authorities.

The GLC also hosted a number of conferences and programs during 2005–2007, including: a Cornell University co-sponsored invitational series on New York State water resources; a national teleconference on the legal aspects of commercializing hydrogen technology; a forum on the siting of wind facilities in New York, in partnership with the New York State Energy Research and Development Authority (NYSERDA); a national teleconference series on renewable energy, sponsored by the American Council on Renewable Energy; and a symposium on municipal broadband and WiFi policies, in cooperation with the New York State Office for Technology, the New York State Public Service Commission, the New York State Department of State, and the Empire State Development Corporation. To celebrate the 20th anniversary of the Ethics in Government Act, the GLC convened a symposium in 2007 keynoted by former Fordham Law School Dean John Feerick. The Government Law Center proceeded to sponsor and co-sponsor numerous conferences in 2008–2009, including a 2009 conference on building in the 21st century, co-sponsored with the American Institute of Architects, New York State and the New York City Bar Association; a symposium on E-FOIL and the impact of technology on accessing records featuring Miriam Nisbet, Director of the Office of Government Information Services, United States National Archives and Records Administration; and a symposium on preserving executive records in 2010, with former Governor of Pennsylvania and United States Attorney General Dick Thornburgh and presidential historian Richard Norton Smith.

In 2010–2011, in conjunction with the Albany Law School's Albany Law Review, the GLC held symposia on education reform with Charles Rose, General Counsel for the United States Department of Education; baseball and the law, featuring John Thorn, Major League Baseball's official Baseball Historian; and on lesbian, gay, bisexual and transgender (LGBT) rights, keynoted by Jeh Johnson, general counsel for the United States Department of Defense.

When Salkin left to become dean of Touro College Jacob D. Fuchsberg Law Center in 2012, Assistant Professor Robert Heverly, who had served as the assistant director of the GLC from 1992 to 2001, became the GLC interim director. He was succeeded in 2013 by Assistant Professor Ray Brescia. Brescia served as the GLC director until May 2016.

Under Brescia's leadership, the GLC began an initiative to bolster economic development, entrepreneurship, emerging technologies, and economic justice. The GLC established a regional innovation lab through the Community Loan Fund of the Capital Region to provide technical support on critical housing and economic initiatives and to combat urban blight.

Former U.S. Senator George Mitchell spoke about his experiences negotiating the Good Friday peace agreement at an event presented by the GLC and the Rockefeller Institute of Government. Judge Sterling Johnson, U.S. District Judge for the Eastern District of New York, delivered the Crawford Lecture on police-community relations. The GLC hosted a panel of newly elected women mayors of upstate New York, including Hon. Kathy Sheehan '94 of Albany, the Hon. Lovely Warren '03 of Rochester. The center co-sponsored a conversation with former State Comptroller H. Carl McCall and other experts examining whether a constitutional convention can be the vehicle for state ethics reforms in New York.

Former New York lieutenant governor Richard Ravitch related his experiences as special advisor to the U.S. Bankruptcy Judge in Detroit at a program on the Detroit process and what lessons New York can learn from it. The GLC held a panel discussion, in conjunction with the New York State Committee on Open Government, on the Freedom of Information Law, its evolution of the past forty years, and what may lie ahead in an age of ubiquitous data. Former New York governor David Paterson addressed a forum on executive authority and the budget process, co-presented with the Rockefeller Institute of Government. The GLC's conference on combatting slavery in the 21st century, held at the United Nations, was simulcast worldwide.

The GLC commemorated the 25th anniversary of the Americans with Disabilities Act by hosting a conference highlighting the civil rights law's history and implementation and examining the challenges ahead. It presented a series on end-of-life care exploring legal and regulatory questions, as well as medical, ethical, financial, societal, and religious matters.

In 2016, the GLC established the Rural Law Initiative to bring legal assistance to small and start-up businesses in rural Upstate New York, where there is a shortage of attorneys. The new program was made possible by funding from the USDA.

During Brescia's tenure, Albany Law was ranked first in the country by preLaw magazine's 2016 winter issue for preparing students for career in government, partly due to the work of the GLC and the opportunities it provides students. This included a new student initiative through which entering students could become Government Law Center Fellows.

Bennett Liebman, former executive director of the Government Law Center, served as acting director of the GLC from June 2016 until Andrew B. Ayers took over as GLC director in November 2016.

During the spring 2017 semester, the Government Law Center Fellows met as a group with Honorable Sonia Sotomayor, Associate Justice of the Supreme Court of the United States, during her visit to Albany Law School. The transcript of Justice Sotomayor's appearance at Albany Law School was published in the Albany Law Review in 2018, with an introduction by GLC Director Andy Ayers.

In 2017, the GLC partnered with Albany Law School's Institute for Financial Market Regulation to host a program on the problem of vacant and abandoned properties, or blight.

The Honorable Thomas J. Vilsack '75, former U.S. Secretary of Agriculture, received the Honorable James P. King '59 Lifetime Achievement in Public Service Award at the Albany Law School and Government Law Center Alumni in Government Awards event held on April 27, 2017.

In November 2017, the Rockefeller Institute of Government, in partnership with the Government Law Center, the Rockefeller College of Public Affairs at the University at Albany, and the University at Buffalo School of Law, announced the formation of the new Center for Law and Policy Solutions, or CLPS, to examine pressing issues at the intersection of law and policy in light of their effects on local communities.

During 2017–2018, the GLC and the Rockefeller Institute of Government partnered to publish One Hundred and Six Ideas for Constitutional Change and Protections in the New York State Constitution Beyond the Federal Bill of Rights. The center released research reports on the history of Union College's involvement in New York State's largest lottery and on ambiguities in Section 107 of New York's general ethics law addressing politics in the workplace.

From 2017–2018, the Rural Law Initiative hosted two programs for craft business attorneys and a program on succession planning for farmers, rural lawyers and other community stakeholders. In partnership with the University at Albany's Center for Human Services Research, the RLI surveyed attorneys registered in New York's rural counties to better understand that demographic. It launched a new website of legal resources for rural-based entrepreneurs and businesses.

In 2018, the GLC launched its explainer series of short policy papers designed to help policymakers and others understand the complex laws that apply to state and local governments' choices about immigration policy.

The GLC, in partnership with the Community Loan Fund of the Capital Region, awarded six fellowships to Albany Law School students to support their summer 2018 internships in the fields of community development and economic justice.

On July 19, 2018, the Government Law Center and the Rockefeller Institute of Government presented a program on the increasing relevance of state constitutions in debates about protections for immigrants, reproductive rights, affirmative action, environmental protections, and LGBTQ rights. In September 2018, they released a policy brief, What Happens to Abortion in New York if Brett Kavanaugh is Confirmed?

In September 2021, retired associate judge of the New York Court of Appeals Leslie Stein became the director of the Government Law Center.

In January 2025, attorney and former Assistant Secretary to Governor Kathy Hochul for Human Services and Mental Hygiene, Patrick Wildes, became the latest Director of the GLC.

== Funding ==
The Government Law Center is funded by Albany Law School, corporate and foundation support, contracts and grants, and through individual donations.

== Government Law Center Advisory Board ==
An Advisory Board, composed of the Albany Law School faculty and leaders from the public, private and non-profit sectors, assists the GLC's Director in charting future initiatives.
