= Sally Kohn =

American political commentator, community organizer (born 1977)

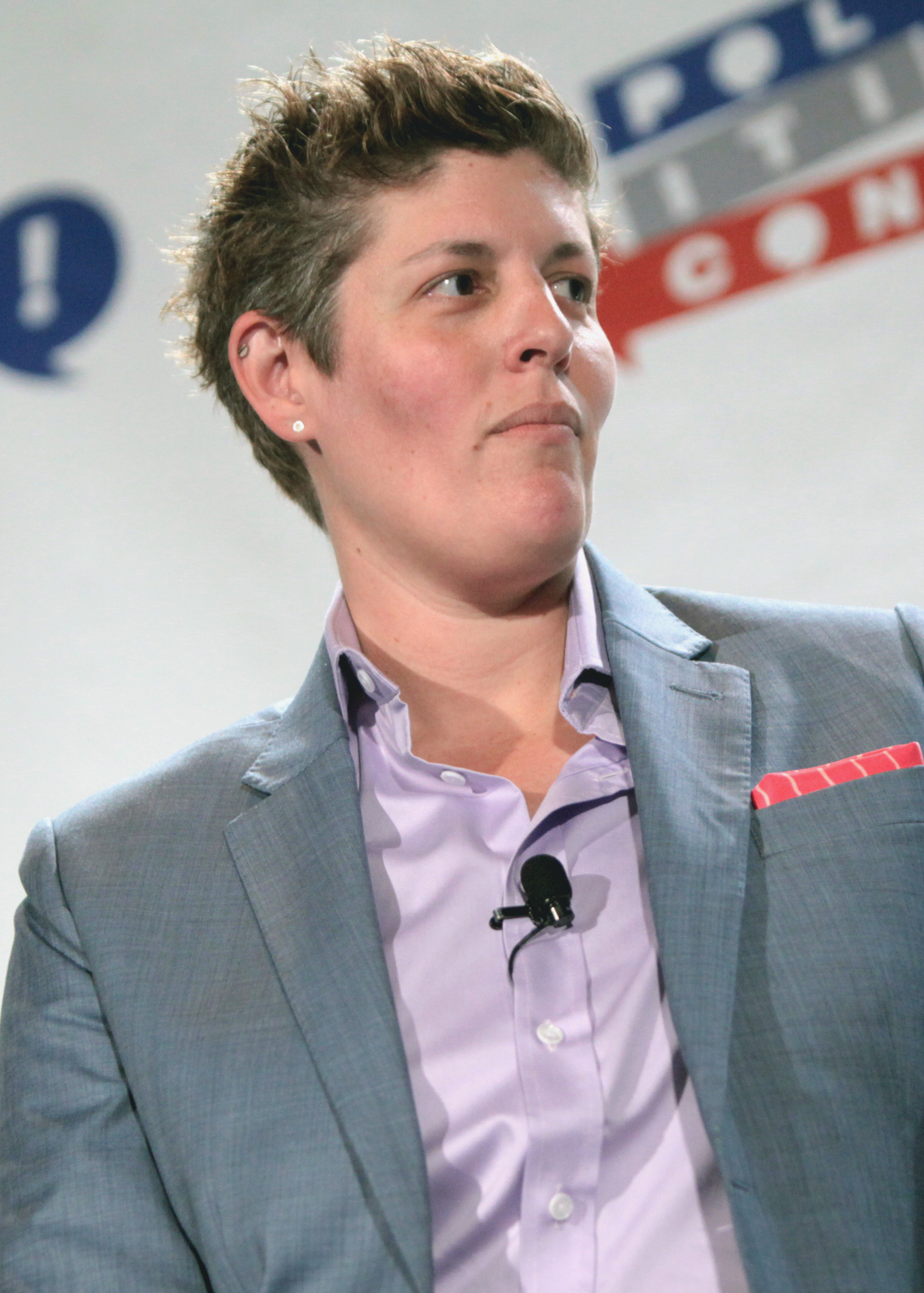
- Kohn at Politicon 2016
- Born: March 27, 1977 (age 49); Allentown, Pennsylvania, U.S.
- Education: George Washington University (BA); New York University (JD, MPA)
- Occupations: Media trainer; Public speaking coach; Speechwriter; Political commentator; Community organizer
- Title: Strategic Communications Consultant, SallyKohn.com
- Political party: Democratic
- Spouse: Sarah Hansen
- Website: www.sallykohn.com

Sally Rebecca Kohn (born March 27, 1977) is an American communications consultant, liberal political commentator, writer, and community organizer. Currently a media trainer, public speaking coach, and ghostwriter, Kohn has been a political commentator on Fox News and CNN. She is the author of The Opposite of Hate: A Field Guide to Repairing Our Humanity (2018), and her political and travel writing has been published in The Washington Post, Afar Magazine, and USA Today, among others. She has given three TED Talks.

== Early life and education ==
Kohn was born in Allentown, Pennsylvania, the daughter of Donald Kohn, an engineer, and Melinda Kohn, a computer programmer. Her family is Jewish.

Kohn was raised in Allentown and attended Moravian Academy in Bethlehem, Pennsylvania. She earned a bachelor’s degree in psychology from George Washington University in Washington, D.C., a juris doctor from New York University School of Law (2002), and a master’s degree in public administration from Robert F. Wagner Graduate School of Public Service. Kohn was a Root Tilden public service scholar at NYU School of Law.

== Career ==
=== Community organizing ===
Kohn was senior campaign strategist with the Center for Community Change, where she served as co-director. She also served as executive director of the Third Wave Foundation. Kohn held a program fellowship at the Ford Foundation, managing more than $15 million in annual grants. She was also a distinguished fellow at the National Gay and Lesbian Task Force Policy Institute. Kohn has consulted at organizations such as the Urban Justice Center.

=== Media career ===
She was recruited into television by former TV executive Geraldine Laybourne.

In 2009, Roger Ailes recruited Kohn to be a paid commentator on Fox News, where she regularly advocated progressive perspectives on shows including Hannity, The O’Reilly Factor, and The Kelly File. Her experience as a “progressive lesbian talking head” on Fox News is the basis for her first TED Talk. In 2013, Kohn and Fox News parted ways, and weeks later, she was hired as a commentator on CNN. During her time at CNN, Kohn co-hosted Crossfire with Newt Gingrich and appeared on an opinion panel show alongside Mel Robbins, Sunny Hostin, and Margaret Hoover.

Kohn also appeared on MSNBC programs such as The Ed Show, Up with Steve Kornacki, and The Last Word with Lawrence O'Donnell. On May 4, 2018, she appeared as a guest on Real Time with Bill Maher.

Kohn has published op-eds for outlets including Fox News, The Washington Post, The Nation, The Christian Science Monitor, and USA Today. She is also a travel writer for Afar Magazine and Fathom, and writes semi-regular home and gardening columns for Remodelista and Gardenista.

=== Training and consulting work ===
Kohn now primarily works as a strategic communications consultant. She leads media training and public speaking workshops for corporate teams, nonprofits, and community organizations, and serves as an executive presence coach for business leaders and Democratic political candidates. She also works as a speechwriter and ghostwriter for op-eds, essays, and books.

Kohn was part of the team that trained speakers for the 2016 Democratic National Convention in Philadelphia, Pennsylvania. She also delivers keynote addresses on strategic communications, creating connections across difference, and other topical issues.

== Published works ==
- Kohn, Sally (2018). The Opposite of Hate: A Field Guide to Repairing Our Humanity. New York: Algonquin Books. ISBN 978-1565127155.

== Personal life ==
Kohn met her wife, Sarah Hansen, at the World Social Forum in Porto Alegre, Brazil, in 2003. Hansen is an activist and consultant who served as executive director of the Environmental Grantmakers Association from 1998 to 2005. The couple has a daughter, Willa Hansen-Kohn, and lives in Park Slope, Brooklyn.

== See also ==
- LGBT culture in New York City
- List of LGBT people from New York City
- New Yorkers in journalism
- Political analysis
- United States cable news
