= Ira Mark Bloom =

American lawyer

- Born: November 10, 1944 (age 81); New York City
- Education: City College of New York (BBA); Syracuse University School of Law (JD)
- Scientific career
- Fields: Estate planning Trusts; Wills; Tax
- Workplaces: Albany Law School

Ira Mark Bloom is an American law professor, legal scholar, and the Justice David Josiah Brewer Distinguished Professor of Law at Albany Law School.

== Education and early career ==
Bloom received a BBA from City College of New York in 1966 and a JD magna cum laude from Syracuse University College of Law in 1969. While at Syracuse he was research editor of the Syracuse Law Review.

After graduating from law school, Bloom spent five years as a trial and appellate attorney with the Tax Division of the United States Department of Justice through its Honors Program.

== Academia ==
Professor Bloom is currently the Justice David Josiah Brewer Distinguished Professor of Law at Albany Law School, where he has taught since 1979. Prior to joining the faculty at Albany, Bloom was a visiting professor at Loyola University New Orleans College of Law, University of the Pacific, McGeorge School of Law, Ohio State University Moritz College of Law, and Tulane University Law School. His courses include Estate Planning, Federal Estate and Gift Taxation, Federal Income Taxation, Future Interests, Property, Trusts and Estates, and Wealth Transmission Process.

Bloom is the co-author of the books Fundamentals of Trusts and Estates, Federal Taxation of Estates, Trusts and Gifts, Estates and Trusts: Cases, Problems and Materials and Drafting New York Wills. His fifth and newest edition of Fundamentals of Trusts and Estates was released in the summer of 2017. He is also the author of fourteen law review articles.

While at Albany Law School, Bloom has served as an advisor for the Tax Moot Court Team of Albany Law School from 1980 through 1989.

== Professional activities ==
Bloom is the chair of the New York State Bar Association Trusts and Estates Law Section. He is also an academic fellow at the American College of Trust and Estate Counsel, a New York State Bar Foundation fellow, and a member of the American Law Institute consultative groups on the restatements of the law of property and trusts.

Bloom was a consultant to the EPTL-SCPA Legislative Advisory Committee in New York State from 1991 to 1993. Bloom also consulted on transfer taxation with the Legislative Tax Study Commission of New York from 1982 to 1983.

== Awards ==
Bloom won Loyola Student Bar Association's Best Professor Award in both 1975 and 1978. In 2009, Bloom received Albany Law School's Excellence in Service Award.
