= Victoria A. Graffeo =

American judge (born 1952)

Associate Judge of the New York Court of Appeals
- In office 2000–2014
- Appointed by: George Pataki
- Preceded by: Joseph W. Bellacosa
- Succeeded by: Leslie Stein

Associate Justice of the Third Judicial Department
- In office 1998–2000
- Appointed by: George Pataki

Justice of the New York Supreme Court, Third Judicial District
- In office 1996–1998
- Appointed by: George Pataki

Solicitor General of New York
- In office 1995–1996
- Appointed by: Dennis Vacco
- Preceded by: Jerry Boone
- Succeeded by: Barbara Gott Billet

Personal details
- Born: April 13, 1952 (age 74) Rockville Centre, New York, U.S.
- Education: State University of New York at Oneonta; Albany Law School

Victoria A. Graffeo (born April 13, 1952) is a former judge of the New York State's Court of Appeals. Judge Graffeo was appointed to the court by Republican Governor George Pataki in 2000 for a 14-year term. Governor Andrew Cuomo declined to appoint her to a second term, and she left the bench on November 29, 2014.

== Education ==
Graffeo graduated from the State University of New York at Oneonta in 1974. She earned her law degree from Albany Law School three years later.

== Legal experience ==
She was in private practice (1978–1982) before entering government service in 1982 as an assistant counsel to the New York State Division of Alcoholism and Alcohol Abuse.

She served as counsel to then New York State Assembly Minority Leader Pro Tempore Kemp Hannon (1984) and as chief counsel to then Assembly Minority Leader Clarence D. Rappleyea, Jr. (1989–1994).

On January 1, 1995, she was appointed Solicitor General for the State of New York by Attorney General Dennis C. Vacco and served in that capacity until appointed, in September 1996, by Governor George E. Pataki to fill a vacancy in the State Supreme Court, Third Judicial District.

She was elected that November to a full term as Justice of New York's State Supreme Court and, in March 1998, became an associate justice of the Appellate Division of the Supreme Court, Third Judicial Department.

Her selection for a 14-year term to New York State's Court of Appeals, also by Governor Pataki, was confirmed by the New York State Senate on November 29, 2000. Judge Graffeo applied to the New York State Commission on Judicial Nominations to be considered for appointment to a second term. The Commission included Graffeo on its list of seven candidates for the position. Governor Andrew Cuomo declined to reappoint Graffeo and instead selected Appellate Division, Third Department Justice Leslie E. Stein for the position. Stein's nomination was confirmed by the New York State Senate on January 9, 2015.

== Personal life ==
Victoria Graffeo, who comes from an Italian American family, resides in Guilderland, New York.

Legal offices
Preceded by Jerry Boone	Solicitor General for the State of New York; 1995-1996	Succeeded by Barbara Gott Billet
Preceded by Joseph W. Bellacosa	Associate Judges of the New York Court of Appeals; 2000–2014	Succeeded by Leslie E. Stein
