= Henry J. Abraham =

American political scientist (1921–2020)

- Abraham in 1972
- Born: August 25, 1921; Offenbach, Weimar Republic
- Died: February 26, 2020 (aged 98); Charlottesville, Virginia, U.S.
- Education: Kenyon College (BA); Columbia University (MA); University of Pennsylvania (PhD)
- Occupations: Professor, writer, lecturer
- Spouse: Mildred K. Abraham (m. 1954)
- Children: 2

Henry Julian Abraham (August 25, 1921 – February 26, 2020) was a German-born American scholar on the judiciary and constitutional law. He was James Hart Professor of Government Emeritus at the University of Virginia. He was the author of 13 books, most in multiple editions, and more than 100 articles on the U.S. Supreme Court, judicial appointments, judicial process, and civil rights and liberties.

== Early life and education ==
Abraham was born in Offenbach, Weimar Republic, the son of Frederick and Liesel Kullman Abraham. His family was Jewish. In 1937, Abraham was sent to the United States to live with relatives during the rise of the Nazi regime. His father was arrested on Kristallnacht and spent two months in Dachau concentration camp. In 1939, Abraham was reunited with his parents and brother Otto, and the family settled in Pittsburgh, PA.

He served in World War II as an enlisted man and officer in U.S. Army Intelligence on duty in Western and Central Europe. He received two Battle Stars and the Commendation Medal. When the war ended in the European Theater, Abraham, who was fluent in German, French, and English, and adequate in Danish, served in a military unit that gathered evidence for use in the Nuremberg War Crimes Trials.

In 1948, Abraham graduated from Kenyon College in Ohio with a bachelor's degree with highest honors in political science, first in his class, summa cum laude and Phi Beta Kappa. He earned his M.A. in public law and government from Columbia University in 1949, and he received his Ph.D. in political science from the University of Pennsylvania in 1952, where he began his teaching career.

== Career ==
After serving in the University of Pennsylvania's Department of Political Science for 23 years (1949–1972), Abraham became a chaired professor in the Department of Government and Foreign Affairs at the University of Virginia in 1972. A pioneer in comparative judicial studies, he served as a Fulbright Scholar in Denmark at the Universities of Copenhagen and Aarhus, where he was instrumental in establishing the country's first Department of Political Science. He lectured throughout the world under U.S.I.A. auspices. He retired from full-time teaching in 1997 after nearly a half-century in the classroom, but he continued to teach in lifelong learning programs in Charlottesville, Virginia.

== Notable students ==
During the span of his career, Abraham taught many notable students, including U.S. Senator Arlen Specter (D.-Penn.); Judge Edward R. Becker, U.S. Third Circuit Court of Appeals; Judge Susan J. Dlott, Chief Judge, U.S. District Court in Ohio; Judge John Roll, U.S. District Court in Arizona; Judge Charles R. Weiner, U.S. District Court in Pennsylvania; Judge Mark S. Davis, U.S. District Court in Virginia; Judge Stefan R. Underhill, U.S. District Court in Connecticut; Chief Justice Leroy Rountree Hassell, Sr., Virginia Supreme Court; Justice Elizabeth B. Lacy, Virginia Supreme Court; author and professor Larry J. Sabato; author and professor Barbara A. Perry; author and professor David A. Yalof; attorney and Pennsylvania State Rep. Mark B. Cohen; author and Law professor Vincent Martin Bonventre; author and professor David Cingranelli; author and professor Bruce Allen Murphy; author and professor Robert Sitkoff; and author John Aloysius Farrell, the biographer of Clarence Darrow.

== Selected publications ==
- The Judicial Process: An Introductory Analysis of the Courts of the United States, England, and France, 7th ed. Oxford University Press. OCLC 801163904
- Freedom and the Court: Civil Rights and Liberties in the United States, 8th ed., with Barbara A. Perry. University Press of Kansas. OCLC 493046218
- Justices, Presidents, Senators: A History of U.S. Supreme Court Appointments from Washington to Bush II, 5th ed. Rowman & Littlefield Publishers, Inc. OCLC 493670891
- The Judiciary: The Supreme Court in the Governmental Process, 10th ed.. New York University Press OCLC 247627575

== Awards and honors ==
In 1983 Abraham was awarded the University of Virginia's most prestigious recognition, the Thomas Jefferson Award, and in 1993 he received the First Lifetime Achievement Award of the Organized Section on Law and Courts of the American Political Science Association. The Daughters of the American Revolution (DAR) awarded him their 2007 Annual Award for Americanism at their national headquarters, Constitution Hall, in Washington, D.C. Other awards include the recipient of the first $1,000 award for "Excellence in Undergraduate Teaching," University of Pennsylvania, 1959; Phi Beta Kappa National Visiting Scholar, 1970–1971; "IMP" Society, Outstanding Contribution to the University Community Award for 1978, University of Virginia; "Z" Society, Distinguished Faculty Award for 1978, the University of Virginia; the 1983 Distinguished Service Award, Virginia Social Science Association; and the 1986 University of Virginia Alumni Association Distinguished Professor Award. Two scholarships were given in Abraham's name at the University of Pennsylvania's Wharton School and its Department of Political Science. He is listed in Who's Who in the World, and Who's Who in America, and others.

In his honor, Professor Abraham's former students and colleagues established the Abraham Distinguished Lecture Series at the University of Virginia School of Law in 1997 under the auspices of the Thomas Jefferson Center for the Protection of Free Expression.

Abraham Lecturers have included Chief Justice William H. Rehnquist of the U.S. Supreme Court; Judge J. Harvie Wilkinson III, 4th U.S. Circuit Court of Appeals; Chief Justice Leroy Rountree Hassell, Sr., Virginia Supreme Court; General William K. Suter Clerk, U.S. Supreme Court; Dean and Professor John Jeffries, University of Virginia School of Law; Dean Kenneth Starr, Pepperdine University School of Law; Theodore Olson, attorney with Gibson, Dunn, and Crutcher; Professor Linda Greenhouse, Yale Law School; Joan Biskupic, USA Today; Jan Crawford Greenburg, ABC News; and Professor Tinsley Yarbrough, East Carolina University. Associate Justice Antonin Scalia of the U.S. Supreme Court was the 2010 Abraham Lecturer. Professor Nadine Strossen, American Civil Liberties Union President (1991–2008), delivered the Abraham Lecture on April 1, 2011.

His alma mater Kenyon College, calling Professor Abraham the most loyal donor in its history (having contributed every year since 1955), created the Henry J. Abraham Society to recognize steadfast and repeated alumni support.

In 2013 the Virginia Social Science Association named their "Best Graduate Student Paper Award", a distinction awarded at their annual conference, after Abraham.
