= Alicia Ouellette =

American lawyer

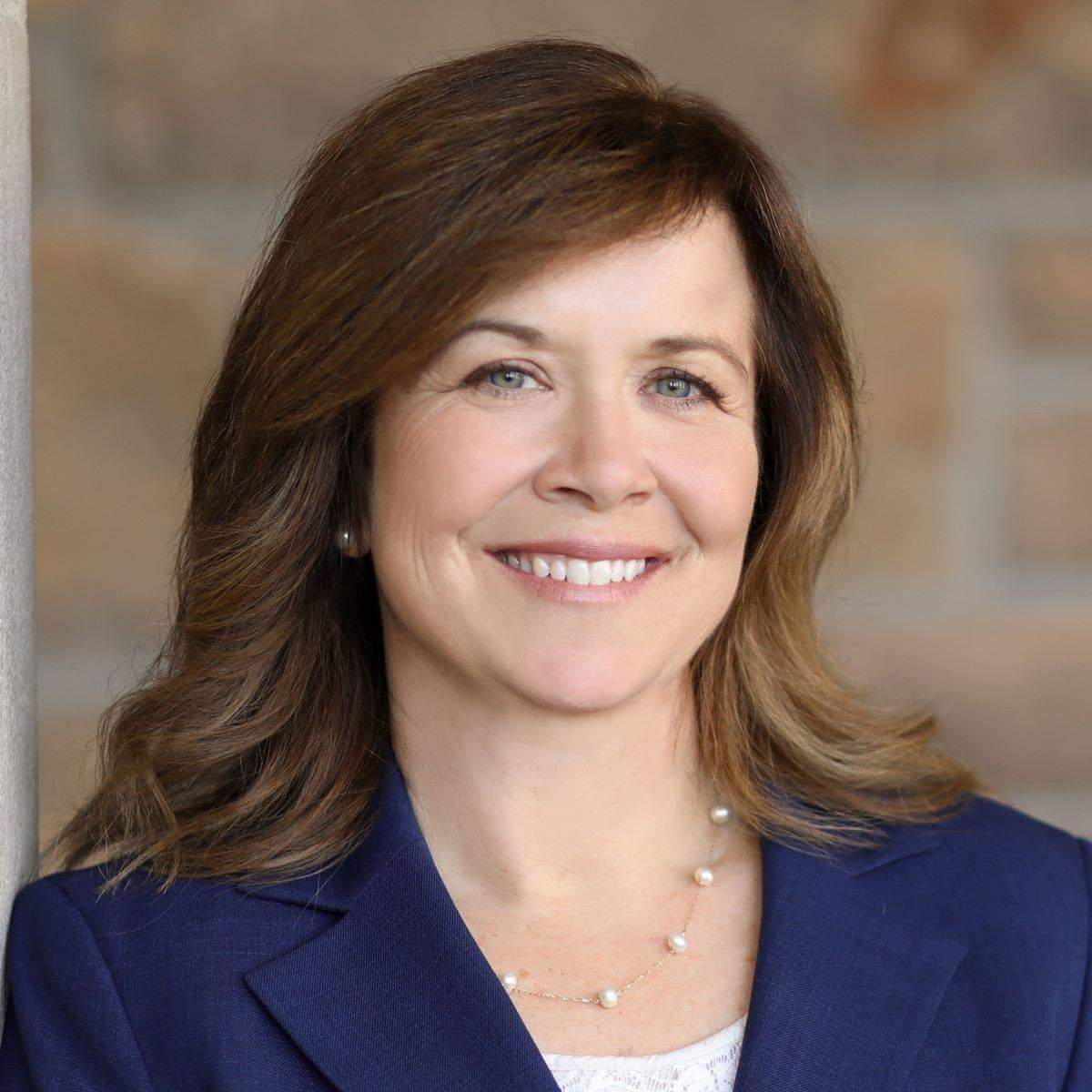
- Education: Hamilton College (BA); Albany Law School (JD)

Alicia Ouellette is an American academic who has served as the dean of the Northwestern School of Law at Lewis and Clark College since January 2025.

She was previously a law professor, President and Dean Emeritus at Albany Law School, and Professor of Bioethics at Union Graduate College and the Mount Sinai School of Medicine.

== Education ==
Oullette attended Longmeadow High School, graduating in 1984. She then graduated cum laude with a degree in psychology from Hamilton College in 1988. In 1994, she graduated from Albany Law School magna cum laude. While there, she was editor-in-chief of the Albany Law Review.

== Legal career ==
After graduating from law school, Ouellette clerked for two years for Judge Howard A. Levine of the New York Court of Appeals. She then worked for a year in the Albany, New York law firm of Whiteman Osterman & Hanna as an associate. She left the firm to join the New York Attorney General's office. There she served as an Assistant Solicitor General, arguing over one hundred cases before the New York Court of Appeals, the United States Court of Appeals for the Second Circuit, and the Appellate Division of the Supreme Court, Third Judicial Department.

== Academia ==
Ouellette joined the faculty of Albany Law School in 2001 as a lawyering professor. She was a founding core faculty member and director of the Health Law and Bioethics program of the Alden March Bioethics Institute of Albany Medical College. In 2006 she received the Distinguished Educator for Excellence in Service Award.

In 2007, she was made an associate professor at the law school and a professor of bioethics in a bioethics program jointly run by Union Graduate College and the Mount Sinai School of Medicine.

She was promoted to professor of law and granted tenure in 2010, and received the Award for Excellence in Scholarship the following year.

In 2012 she was appointed Associate Dean for Student Affairs. She later became Associate Dean for Academic Affairs and Intellectual Life, and Associate Dean for Faculty Scholarship and Professional Development. She was also a Director of the State University of New York at Albany Global Institute for Health and Human Rights.

On October 14, 2014, the board of trustees appointed Ouellette as acting dean after Penelope Andrews stepped down as the leader of Albany Law School. She became the 18th Dean and President of Albany Law School on July 1, 2015, and served in that role until June 30, 2023.

== Publications ==
She has written 18 shorter works, such as law review articles, given over forty professional presentations, and is the author of the book Bioethics and Disability.
