= Urban Justice Center =

Non-profit organization in New York City, U.S.

- Founded: 1984
- Type: Non-profit
- Location(s): 40 Rector Street; 9th Floor; New York City, NY U.S.
- Services: Legal aid Class action litigation Legislative advocacy Community education
- Key people: Doug Lasdon, Executive Director and Founder
- Staff: 100+
- Website: urbanjustice.org

The Urban Justice Center is a non-profit legal services and advocacy organization serving the New York City area. It is known as an incubator for progressive programs and initiatives and for being a significant legal presence in the struggles of New York's poverty stricken and minority populations. Urban Justice Center won the 2020 Webby People's Voice Award for Law in the category Web.

== History ==
Founded in 1984 as the Legal Action Center for the Homeless by Doug Lasdon, the Urban Justice Center (UJC) works for vulnerable New Yorkers through direct civil legal, political organizing, legislative advocacy and policy education. Some of the UJC's important legal victories in aid of the indigent include Doe v. City of New York, Tolle v. Dinkins, and joint legal action with other groups against the Grand Central Partnership and the 34th Street Partnership for hiring homeless employees at $1 an hour. The UJC's community building and immigrant aid programming was also recently recognized by New York City by their naming as finalists in the Competition THRIVE.

Originally operating from a burned-out building in Harlem staffed only by Lasdon the UJC has relocated to Lower Manhattan and as of 2013 has a staff of over 100 with an operating budget of over $7.5 million. The UJC has provided 96,000 people with community legal education and has closed 8,881 cases thus far. Real estate deals undertaken by Lasdon in 2007 led to the $5.7 million sale, close to 10 times the initial amount paid for, of the UJC office space at 666 Broadway in 1997. The UJC's headquarters are located on Rector Street, and were purchased with its real estate profits and a $5 million grant from New York City.

The UJC sponsors the International Refugee Assistance Project (IRAP), which works to organize law students and lawyers to develop and enforce legal and human rights for refugees and displaced persons. They have offices in New York City, Jordan, and Lebanon. IRAP is a plaintiff in the 2017 decision International Refugee Assistance Project v. Trump and co-counsel in Darweesh v. Trump.

== Organization ==
The UJC is made up of 10 anti-poverty projects devoted to specific goals and clientele. Projects are led by directors, who are empowered to manage the staffing, fundraising and advocacy work for their individual projects almost autonomously. The executive office of the UJC provides overhead funding for the organization and overall mission direction. The executive office led by the UJC's founder and executive director along with two associate directors and maintains a support staff of administrators, development and financial officers.

== Notable alumni ==
- Cory Booker, United States Senator from New Jersey, former UJC Staff Attorney
- Raymond Brescia, Law professor, former UJC Associate Director and Community Development Project Director
- Harvey Epstein, New York State Assemblyman, former associate director and Community Development Project Director
- Sally Kohn, Political commentator, former UJC Consultant
- Erin Siegal McIntyre, Photographer and writer, co-director and co-producer of the UJC-funded documentary "Taking the Pledge"
