= Madeline Singas =

American judge (born 1966)

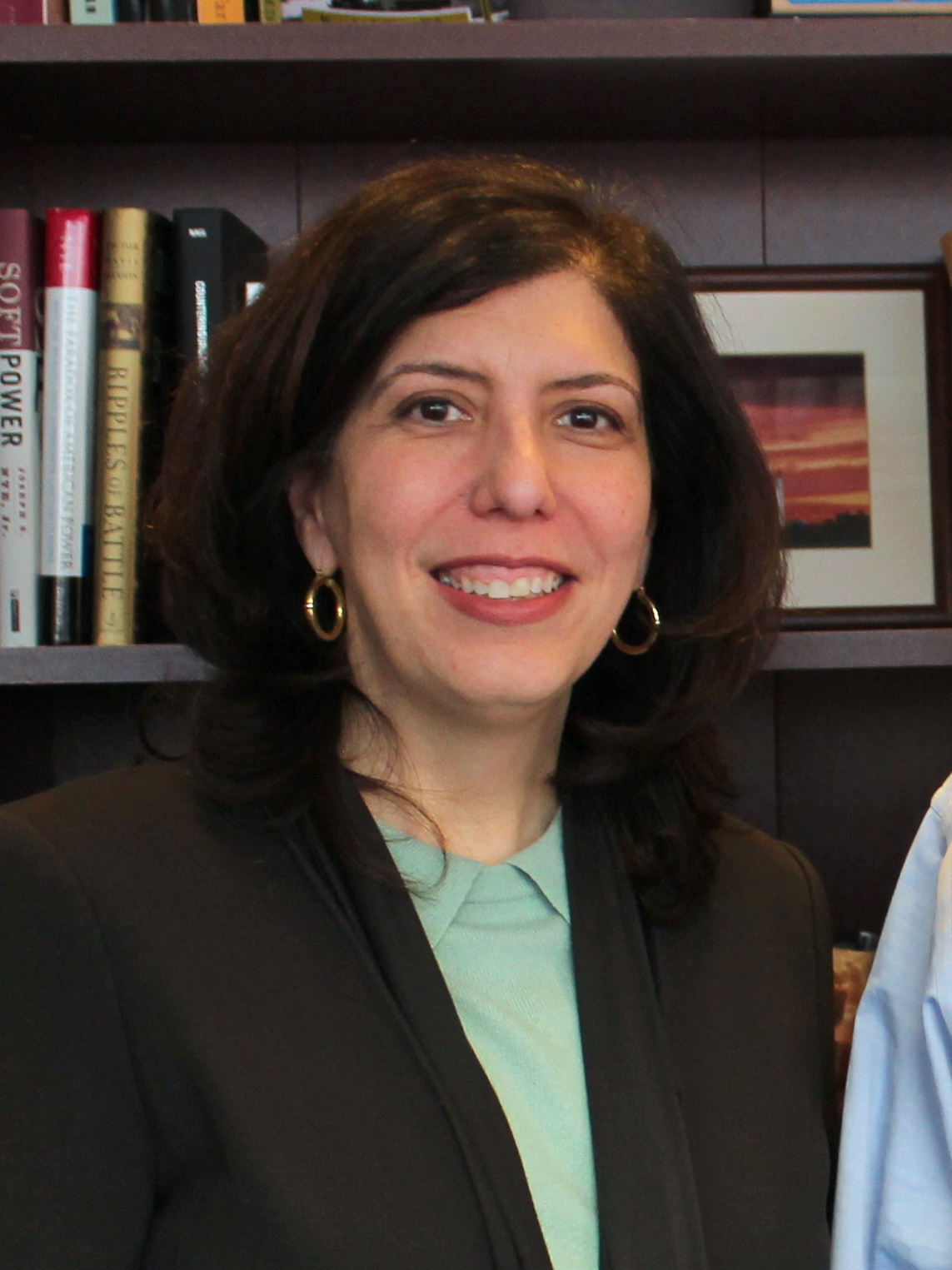
- Singas in 2015

Associate Judge of the New York Court of Appeals
- Incumbent
- Assumed office June 8, 2021
- Appointed by: Andrew Cuomo
- Preceded by: Leslie Stein

District Attorney of Nassau County
- In office January 6, 2015 – June 7, 2021
- Appointed by: Andrew Cuomo
- Preceded by: Kathleen Rice
- Succeeded by: Anne Donnelly

Personal details
- Born: 1966 (age 59–60) Worcester, Massachusetts, U.S.
- Party: Democratic
- Education: Barnard College (BA); Fordham University (JD)

Madeline Singas (born 1966) is an American attorney and judge who serves as an associate judge of the New York Court of Appeals since 2021.

== Early life and education ==
Singas was born in Worcester, Massachusetts in 1966 to a family of Greek immigrants. She grew up in Astoria, Queens. She graduated from The Bronx High School of Science in Bronx, New York. She earned degrees at Barnard College at Columbia University in New York City and Fordham University School of Law.

== Career ==
Before joining the Nassau County District Attorney's Office, Singas was an assistant district attorney in the New York City borough of Queens. She began there in 1991, and worked in the Domestic Violence Bureau. After joining the Nassau County District Attorney's Office, she was appointed chief of the newly created Special Victims Bureau in 2006 by Nassau County district attorney Kathleen Rice. Singas became Chief Assistant District Attorney in Nassau County in 2011.

=== District attorney of Nassau County ===
Singas served as acting Nassau DA starting in January 2015, assuming the role following Rice's election to Congress. Upon taking office, Singas became the first Greek-American and the second woman to become the top law enforcement official of Nassau County. She was elected in November 2015 and took office for a four-year term in January 2016.

During an interview with Bill Ritter in late 2017, referring to crimes committed by MS-13 gang members, Singas stated: "The crimes that we're talking about are brutal. Their weapon of choice is a machete. We end up seeing people with injuries that I've never seen before. You know, limbs hacked off. And that's what the bodies look like that we're recovering. So they're brutal. They're ruthless, and we're gonna be relentless in our attacks against them." On March 27, 2018, Singas announced the establishment of the Nassau County School & Community Safety Task Force to enhance the security of schools, colleges, places of worship, and public buildings. The Task Force is chaired by Deputy Executive Assistant District Attorney for Community Relations, Joyce Smith. Among the Task Force's goals is to "prepare a training curriculum for educators and mental health practitioners regarding the health and safety exceptions to . . . privacy laws such as the Health Insurance Portability and Accountability Act (HIPAA) and the Family Education Rights and Privacy Act (FERPA), [which] are frequently cited by medical professionals and school officials as obstacles to information-sharing regarding potential threats."

=== Appointment as special prosecutor ===
In May 2018, in the wake of allegations of sexual assault by then-attorney general Eric Schneiderman, New York Governor Andrew Cuomo appointed Singas as special prosecutor to investigate such allegations, as well as any facts "suggesting that the attorney general staff and office resources may have been used to facilitate alleged abusive liaisons."

=== Public policy advocacy ===
As District Attorney, Singas was a vocal advocate for reform in the criminal legal system. Working with the Unified Court System, she volunteered her office to lead a pilot program that served as a precursor to the state's “Raise the Age” law. She was an advocate for eliminating cash bail, and replacing it with a validated risk assessment tool, writing in 2019 with Suffolk County District Attorney Timothy Sini in Newsday, “We need to overhaul New York’s bail system because no one should be in jail awaiting trial simply because they’re poor. We support the transition to cashless bail." As to discovery, they wrote "New York’s discovery laws, which detail how information must be shared before trial, also warrant reform." They continued, " The state legislature is considering other worthy reforms to ensure defendants receive a speedy trial, reduce immigration consequences of minor offenses, and reduce reincarceration for minor technical violations of parole. New Yorkers deserve comprehensive criminal justice reform this year that enhances fairness..." In 2020, she joined fellow District Attorneys Darcel D. Clark, Eric Gonzalez, Melinda Katz, Michael E. McMahon, Anthony A. Scarpino Jr., and Cyrus R. Vance Jr. calling for further reforms, and reiterating the call to eliminate cash bail, in an op-ed in The New York Times. Despite her very public record of advocacy for broad criminal justice reforms, including the complete abolition of cash bail, opponents of her confirmation to the Court of Appeals claimed, falsely, that Singas opposed bail reform.

Singas also was among the first prosecutors to support the “Less Is More Act,” which made broad changes to New York's parole system to spare those on parole the draconian consequences of minor, technical violations.

Singas served on the Board of Directors of Prosecutors Against Gun Violence and was a vocal advocate of comprehensive gun reform. On April 3, 2018, Singas appeared at a rally and spoke before an audience of about 200 people at Temple Beth Israel, a synagogue in Port Washington, New York, advocating in favor of what she described as common sense gun legislation. She was quoted as having said: "Why is legislation so difficult to get passed? I don’t know the answer to that question."

Singas was the defendant in a federal constitutional case, Maloney v. Singas (formerly Maloney v. Rice), in which the plaintiff is seeking a declaration that he has a constitutional right to possess nunchaku, a martial-arts weapon, in his home for peaceful martial-arts practice and home defense. In that case, through counsel, Singas has argued that nunchaku are "dangerous and unusual" weapons that may be banned totally even for such use.

=== New York court of appeals service ===
On May 25, 2021, governor Andrew Cuomo announced that he would nominate Singas to serve as an associate judge of the New York Court of Appeals, replacing Leslie Stein. She was confirmed by the New York State Senate on June 8, 2021, and took office that same day. Her formal investiture ceremony took place on April 5, 2022.

== Electoral history ==
2019 Nassau County District Attorney election
Party	Candidate	Votes	%
Democratic	Madeline Singas (incumbent)	82,933	60.34%
Republican	Francis McQuade	54,509	39.66%
Total votes		137,442	100.0%
Democratic hold			

2015 Nassau County District Attorney election
Party	Candidate	Votes	%
Democratic	Madeline Singas	113,110	57.96%
Republican	Kate Murray	82,028	42.04%
Total votes		195,138	100.0%
Democratic hold			

== See also ==
- List of Fordham University School of Law alumni
- List of Bronx High School of Science alumni

Legal offices
Preceded by Leslie Stein	Associate Judge of the New York Court of Appeals; 2021–present	Incumbent
