= Erin Siegal McIntyre =

American photographer

- Born: Erin Siegal; United States of America
- Education: Columbia University, Parsons School of Design, School of Visual Arts
- Notable work: Finding Fernanda
- Awards: Overseas Press Club of America 2011 Citation for Excellence, Robert Spiers Benjamin Award for Best Reporting in Any Medium on Latin America; 2012 James Madison Freedom of Information Award

Erin Siegal McIntyre is an American investigative journalist, photographer and author. She is a journalism professor at UNC Chapel Hill. She was previously a senior fellow at the Schuster Institute for Investigative Journalism at Brandeis University, and her photography is represented by Redux Pictures in New York. Siegal McIntyre's work has appeared in The New York Times, Newsweek, Time, Rolling Stone, and many other magazines and newspapers. She is based in Tijuana and reports from the U.S.-Mexico border.

== Education ==
Siegal McIntyre attended the School of Visual Arts and Parsons School of Design. In 2008, Siegal was a fellow at the Stabile Center for Investigative Reporting at the Columbia University Graduate School of Journalism, where she earned a master's degree with honors in 2009. Her master's project was advised by Wayne Barrett and focused on organized crime and corruption in international adoption.

== Professional career ==
Siegal McIntyre began her career in photojournalism as an assistant to Magnum Photos photographer Susan Meiselas. She also worked as studio manager for war photographer and VII Photo co-founder James Nachtwey.

Siegal McIntyre's work has appeared in numerous publications including Rolling Stone, The New Yorker, and The New York Times. Her work has been selected for inclusion in Reuters' 2008 Images of the Year, Redux Pictures' Year in Pictures 2007, and Reuters' "Photos of the Month" in March 2007, December 2006 and October 2005.

In 2006, Siegal McIntyre co-directed and co-produced a 13-minute documentary, “Taking the Pledge”, exploring the impact of a Bush administration rule within USAID that stipulated that organizations receiving U.S. funds for HIV/AIDS prevention must sign an anti-prostitution pledge. The effects of this Presidential Emergency Plan for AIDS Relief (PEPFAR) clause are explained by directly impacted sex workers from around the world in Khmer, Thai, French, Portuguese, and Bengali (with English subtitles). “Taking the Pledge” screened at the 2008 International AIDS Conference in Mexico City, the 2007 World Social Forum in Atlanta, and the 2007 International Conference on AIDS in Asia and the Pacific in Mali. The film was produced in collaboration with the Network of Sex Work Projects and funded by the Urban Justice Center of New York City.

The Hearst company group investigation "Dead by Mistake", undertaken collaboratively with the 2008–2009 Stabile Fellows at Columbia University Graduate School of Journalism, was awarded a 2009 Sigma Delta Chi Award for Investigative Reporting.

In 2012, Siegal McIntyre was part of a three-person team that received a 2012–2013 Soros Justice Fellowship from the Open Society Foundations to report on life after deportation for immigrants removed from the United States. She worked alongside legal scholar Beth C. Caldwell and deportee Joel Medina, who had previously served a 14-year prison sentence and was pardoned by California governor Jerry Brown. Together, the team produced stories for a variety of print and broadcast media outlets including Univision's Aqui y Ahora, Symbolia Magazine, and Al Jazeera. Their radio series on the American children of deportees for the KJZZ Fronteras Desk won Best Radio/Audio Feature Series of 2014 from the Society of Professional Journalists.

While working as an investigative producer and correspondent for Univision, Siegal McIntyre and Deborah Bonello co-produced a story for the Fusion news program America with Jorge Ramos examining sexual assault perpetrated against women and girls on the migrant trail along Mexico's southern border with Guatemala. Donald Trump later cited the Fusion report when he falsely called Mexican nationals in the U.S. "rapists" during the 2015 U.S. presidential campaign. When questioned about his claim, Trump expressed confusion, asking CNN host Don Lemon "Well, somebody's doing the raping, Don. I mean somebody's doing it. Who's doing the raping? Who's doing the raping?" When she appeared on CNN to talk about the investigation, which was honored with a 2015 Clarion Award for Best National Television News Magazine and a 2015 Sunshine State Award for Best Feature Reporting for TV, Siegal McIntyre said, "I'm not sure if Mr. Trump actually read the article or watched the 8-minute broadcast story... I have to say I'm still a little bit baffled."

On the U.S-Mexico border, Siegal McIntyre has covered a variety of topics, including human rights, criminal justice, human trafficking, the Border Patrol, and extensive coverage of immigration issues, including the deportation of U.S. military veterans. Her work has been supported by various grants and institutions including the Fund for Investigative Journalism, the Investigative Reporters and Editors Freelance Fellowship, the Journalism and Women Symposium Joan Cook Fellowship, the Anne McCormick O'Hare Memorial Award from the Newswomen's Club of New York and the Leonard C. Goodman Institute for Investigative Reporting.

== Books and anthologies ==
Finding Fernanda: Two Mothers, One Child, and a Cross-border Search for Truth (Beacon Press 2012) investigates a case of child kidnapping for international adoption while exposing entrenched criminal networks and corruption that became endemic to U.S. adoptions from Guatemala. Siegal McIntyre's work on the topic was featured on an hour-long CBS 48 Hours special investigation, "Perilous Journey", which went on to win a 2015 Emmy Award.

The U.S. Embassy Cables: Adoption Fraud in Guatemala, 1987-2010 (Cathexis Press, 2012) is a three-part volume consisting of diplomatic cables obtained via Freedom of Information Act requests over a two-year period. The compilation contains unedited cable communications between the U.S. State Department and the U.S. Embassy in Guatemala.

Her work has appeared in the following anthologies:

- “$pread: The Best of the Magazine that Illuminated the Sex Industry and Started a Media Revolution” by various authors, edited by Rachel Aimee, Eliyanna Kaiser, and Audacia Ray, The Feminist Press, March 2015.
- “American Youth” by the photographers of Redux Pictures, published by Contrasto, June 2009.
- “Shut Them Down: The G8, Gleneagles 2005 and the Movement of Movements” by various authors, edited by D. Harvie, K. Milburn, B. Trott, and D. Watts, Autonomedia, January 2006.
