= Albany Law Review =

- Discipline: Law
- Language: English

Publication details
- History: 1936–present
- Publisher: Albany Law School (United States)
- Frequency: Quarterly

Standard abbreviations
- Bluebook: Alb. L. Rev.
- ISO 4: Albany Law Rev.

Indexing
- ISSN: 0002-4678
- LCCN: 97660517
- OCLC no.: 01479006

Links
- Journal homepage; Online archive

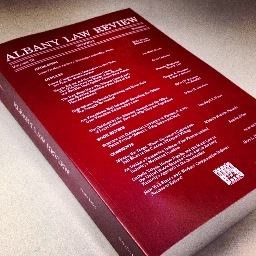

The Albany Law Review is a law review edited by students at Albany Law School. The Albany Law Review is one of three student-edited law journals published by the school.

== History ==
The Albany Law Review was founded in 1936. Its founding followed the publication of the Albany Law School Journal, the first student-edited legal periodical in the United States. The Albany Law Review considers itself to be the Albany Law School Journal's successor publication. The only verified surviving copy of the Albany Law School Journal hangs in the office of the editor-in-chief of the Albany Law Review.

The Albany Law Review has historically published four issues annually. In 1996, the Albany Law Review absorbed the Rutgers publication State Constitutional Commentary and Notes, dedicating one of its four annual issues, titled State Constitutional Commentary, to scholarship related to state constitutional law. In 2010, the journal dedicated a second issue, titled New York Appeals, to the study of appellate courts in New York state. The following year, a third issue, titled Miscarriages of Justice (and now known as Justice Commentaries), was dedicated to exploring failures in the criminal justice system. That issue was initially created in partnership with the State University of New York at Albany's School of Criminal Justice.

In addition, the Albany Law Review has also sponsored a series of symposia, bringing noted speakers on contemporary legal topics to the law school. These speakers range from politicians, to legal academics, to sitting members of the judiciary. In recent years, the Albany Law Review has held two symposia each year.

== Membership ==
The members of the Albany Law Review are all students at Albany Law School. As with many law reviews, attaining membership on the Albany Law Review is a competitive process. Students become eligible for journal membership upon completion of their first year of law school. Offers of membership are extended based on student class standing or on the results of a writing competition jointly administered by the school's three student-edited journals. Members are given editorial and research related assignments in their second year of law school, and are required to produce a note or comment of publishable quality. In their third year, members may be elected to the editorial board, which handles the overall production and publication of the journal.

The faculty advisor of the Albany Law Review is Vincent Martin Bonventre.

== Notable symposia ==
- Criminal Justice on Trial: Failings, Possibilities, and Aspirations (April 15, 2025)
  - Panelists: New York Chief Judge Rowan D. Wilson, Former New York Chief Judge Jonathan Lippman, President Karol V. Mason, and Prof. Annie Rody-Wright
  - Moderators: Prof. Vincent Martin Bonventre and Prof. Dale Margolin Cecka
- From Arizona v. United States to Now: The Status of Immigration Federalism (February 7, 2025)
  - Panelists: Prof. Michael Wishnie, Prof. Monica W. Varsanyi, Prof. Rick Su, Prof. Jennifer Chacón, and Prof. Ava Ayers
  - Moderator: Prof. Lauren DesRosiers
- The New York Court of Appeals: The Untold Secrets of Eagle Street (March 21, 2013)
  - Panelists: New York Chief Judge Jonathan Lippman; Associate Judges Robert S. Smith, Victoria A. Graffeo, Susan Phillips Read, Eugene F. Pigott, Jr., and Jenny Rivera.
- What Are We Saying: Violence, Vulgarity, Lies . . . and the Importance of 21st Century Free Speech (September 27, 2012)
  - Moderators: Adam Liptak and Ronald K.L. Collins
  - Panelists: Floyd Abrams, Alan Morrison (lawyer), Susan N. Herman, Robert M. O'Neil, and Robert D. Richards
- The State of State Courts (March 8, 2012)
  - Moderator: New York Chief Judge Jonathan Lippman
  - Panelists: Wisconsin Chief Justice Shirley S. Abrahamson, Utah Chief Justice Christine M. Durham, and Connecticut Chief Justice Chase T. Rogers
- Great Women, Great Chiefs (February 16, 2011)
  - Speakers: Massachusetts Chief Justice Margaret H. Marshall, Iowa Chief Justice Marsha K. Ternus, and South Carolina Chief Justice Jean H. Toal

== Notable alumni ==
- Warren M. Anderson, New York State Senate Majority Leader
- Howard C. Bushman, Jr., Law Clerk to Robert H. Jackson
- Frances E. Cafarell, Clerk of the Appellate Division, Fourth Department
- Anthony V. Cardona, former Presiding Justice of the New York Appellate Division, Third Department
- Jeremy Cooney, New York State Senator
- Craig J. Doran, Administrative Judge for the Seventh Judicial District
- Domenick L. Gabrielli, Associate Judge, New York Court of Appeals
- Michael J. Garcia, Associate Judge, New York Court of Appeals, former U.S. Attorney for the Southern District of New York
- Megyn Kelly, news anchor, Fox News Channel
- Alicia Ouellette, 18th President and Dean, Albany Law School
- Richard Parsons, Chairman & former CEO of Time Warner
- Stephen P. Younger, 113th President of the New York State Bar Association

== Rankings ==
Among United States law journals, Albany Law Review is ranked #234 by Washington and Lee University Law School and #111 by a professor at the University of Oregon School of Journalism and Communication.
