= Sale v. Haitian Centers Council, Inc. =

Sale v. Haitian Centers Council
- Supreme Court of the United States

Argued March 2, 1993 Decided June 21, 1993
- Full case name: Sale, Acting Commissioner, Immigration and Naturalization Service, et al., Petitioners v. Haitian Centers Council, Inc.
- Citations: 509 U.S. 155 (more) 113 S. Ct. 2549; 125 L. Ed. 2d 128; 1993 U.S. LEXIS 4247
- Argument: Oral argument

Holding
- Neither 243(h) nor Article 33 limits the President's power to order the Coast Guard to repatriate undocumented aliens intercepted on the high seas.

Court membership
- Chief Justice William Rehnquist Associate Justices Byron White · Harry Blackmun; John P. Stevens · Sandra Day O'Connor; Antonin Scalia · Anthony Kennedy; David Souter · Clarence Thomas

Case opinions
- Majority: Stevens, joined by Rehnquist, White, O'Connor, Scalia, Kennedy, Souter, Thomas
- Dissent: Blackmun

Sale v. Haitian Centers Council, 509 U.S. 155 (1993), is a case that the U.S. Supreme Court decided on June 21, 1993. The Court ruled that the President's executive order requiring all aliens intercepted on the high seas to be repatriated was not limited by the Immigration and Nationality Act of 1952 or Article 33 of the United Nations Convention Relating to the Status of Refugees.

== Background ==
In 1981, the United States and the Haitian government made an agreement to stop all vessels coming to the United States and return any undocumented persons who were not refugees. The Haitian government promised that the passengers on these vessels would not be harmed upon return. After a regime change in Haiti, American policy changed such that all undocumented aliens would be sent back unless they landed and made an entry onto the territory of the United States.

The Court heard oral argument on March 2, 1993. The argument for the plaintiff was made by then-Yale law professor Harold Koh (from 2009 to 2013, Koh was the Legal Adviser of the Department of State).

== Decision ==
The 8–1 decision was delivered by Justice John Paul Stevens with Justice Harry Blackmun dissenting, and overturned a decision of the Second Circuit Court of Appeals.

Criticizing the majority decision in his dissent, Justice Blackmun wrote, "Today's majority ... decides that the forced repatriation of the Haitian refugees is perfectly legal, because the word "return" does not mean return, because the opposite of "within the United States" is not outside the United States, and because the official charged with controlling immigration has no role in enforcing an order to control immigration." (citations omitted)

A slightly different case with the name Haitian Centers Council v. Sale was argued and won by Koh's team of law students from Yale before Judge Sterling Johnson of the U.S. District Court for the Eastern District of New York. Lead counsel was provided on a pro bono basis by Joe Tringali of Simpson Thacher & Bartlett. However, this decision was later vacated due to a negotiated settlement deal made by the Clinton Administration and Yale Law School. The full background and details of both cases are found in the book Storming the Court by Brandt Goldstein.

== See also ==
- List of United States Supreme Court cases, volume 509
- List of United States Supreme Court cases
- Lists of United States Supreme Court cases by volume
- List of United States Supreme Court cases by the Rehnquist Court
