= I. India Thusi =

Nigerian American lawyer and academic

- Occupation: Law professor

Academic background
- Education: Emory University (BA) Fordham University School of Law (JD) University of Witwatersrand (PhD)
- Alma mater: University of Witwatersrand

Academic work
- Discipline: Law
- Sub-discipline: Criminal law, regulation of vice, police abolition, critical race theory, feminist legal theory
- Institutions: Indiana University Bloomington

I. India Thusi is a lawyer and academic specializing in criminal law, especially as it relates to vice, police abolition, and critical race theory. She is currently a law professor at Indiana University Bloomington and serves on the Academics Committee of the American Bar Association Professional Development Division. She was a visiting Professor of Law at Cornell Law School in 2023-2024.

== Career ==
Thusi was born in Nigeria and moved to the United States at an early age. She attended Gorton High School and received her BA from Emory University, where she studied anthropology and English. After graduation, she taught at Gorton for a year. She then enrolled at Fordham University School of Law, where she wrote a student note about criminal procedure for the Fordham Urban Law Journal.

After graduating cum laude, she clerked for Judge Robert L. Carter at the United States District Court for the Southern District of New York. She then worked at the American Civil Liberties Union for a year, where she focused on the school-to-prison pipeline. After that, she clerked for Judge Damon Keith on the United States Court of Appeals for the Sixth Circuit. She then clerked for Justice Johann van der Westhuizen at the Constitutional Court of South Africa.

Following her clerkships, she enrolled at the University of the Witwatersrand, where she completed her PhD in Social Anthropology & Law and Society. Following her W.E.B. Du Bois Institute Fellowship at Harvard University, she worked at the Opportunity Agenda for two years. In 2017, she was named to the faculty of California Western School of Law. While there she earned Fulbright Global Scholar award to support her research in Sweden and New Zealand. She taught for one year at Widener University Delaware Law School, and currently teaches at Indiana University Bloomington, where she holds a joint appointment at Indiana University Maurer School of Law and the Kinsey Institute.

== Published works ==
=== Books ===
- Thusi, I. India. (2022). Policing Bodies: Law, Sex Work, and Desire in Johannesburg. Stanford: Stanford University Press. ISBN 978-1-5036-2975-2

=== Academic articles ===
- Thusi, I. India. (2020). "Blue Lives & The Permanence of Racism". Cornell Law Review Online. 105:14. 14–30 – via SSRN.
- Thusi, I. India. (2010). "Deconstructing the Marginalization of Underclass Students: Disciplinary Alternative Education". University of Toledo Law Review. 42. 429–465 – via HeinOnline.
- Thusi, I. India & Kim, Catherine Y. (2009). "Policing in Schools: Developing a Governance Document for School Resource Officers in K-12 Schools".
- Thusi, I. India. (2018). "Radical Feminist Harms on Sex Workers". Lewis & Clark Law Review. 22:1. 185–229 – via HeinOnline.
- Thusi, I. India (2021). "Feminist Scripts for Punishment". Harvard Law Review. 134:7. 2449–2484 – via Harvard Law Review.

=== News articles ===
- Thusi, I. India. (September 10, 2020). "South Africa Shows that Diversity is not the Answer to Police Violence". The Hill. Retrieved October 24, 2023.
- Thusi, I. India. (December 20, 2021). "It's Time to Stop Policing Women's Bodies". The Hill. Retrieved October 24, 2023.
- Thusi, I. India. (December 4, 2016). "Failure to Prosecute Cops Undermines Public Trust". The Hill. Retrieved October 24, 2023.

== Awards and honors ==
- In 2019 Thusi was named one of the American Bar Association’s Top 40 Young Lawyers On the Rise.
- In 2020 Thusi was named Top 40 Under 40 Emory University Alum.
- In 2024 The Law and Society Association awarded Thusi the John Hope Franklin Prize.
