= Albany Law School =

Private law school in Albany, New York, US

Coordinates: 42°39′08.51″N 73°46′38.40″W

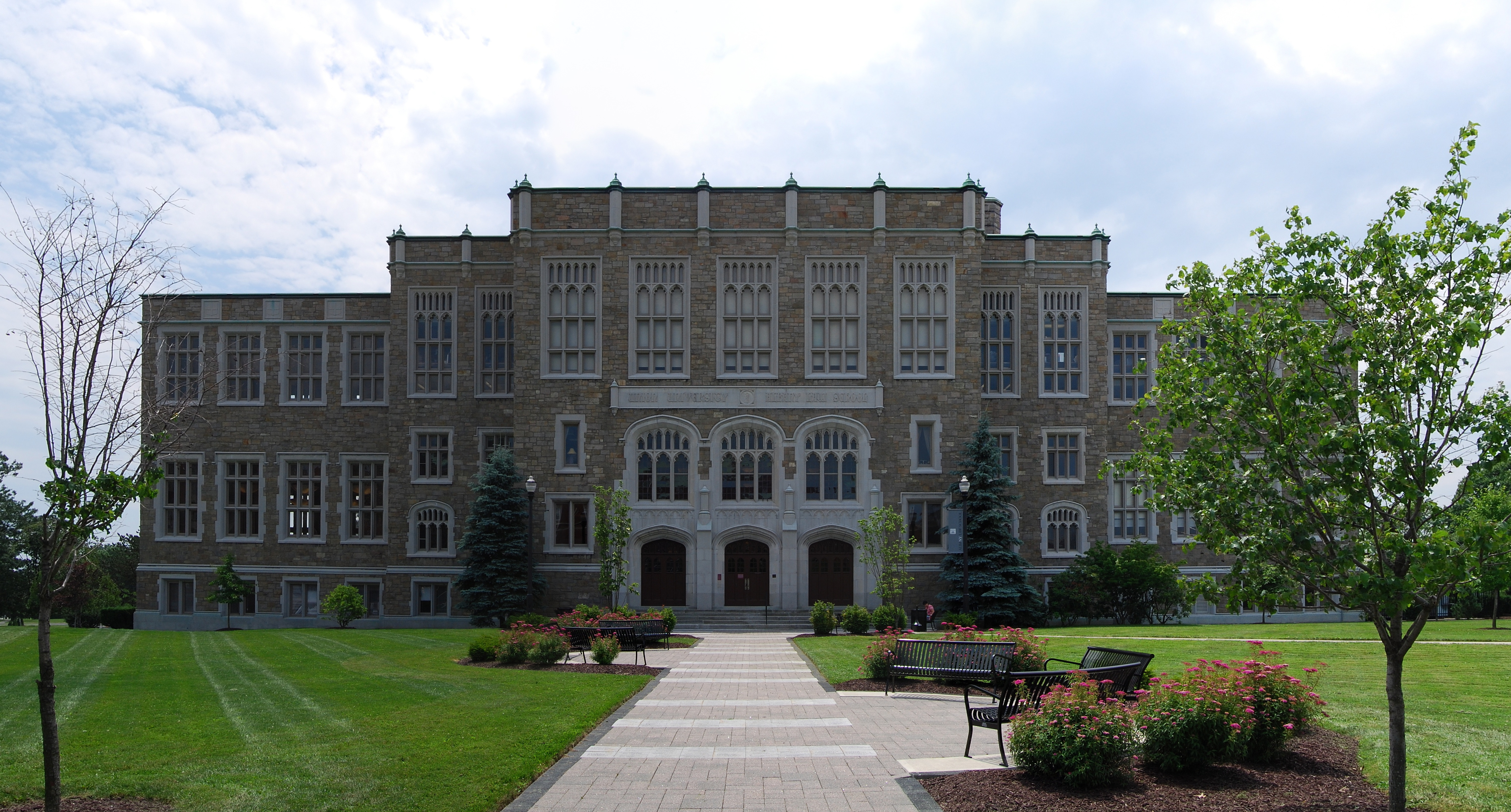
- Parent school: Union University
- Established: 1851
- School type: Private law school
- Dean: Cinnamon Carlarne
- Location: Albany, New York, United States
- Enrollment: 594 (2025)
- Faculty: 48 full-time, 29 part-time (2025)
- USNWR ranking: 105th (2024)
- Bar pass rate: 91.2% (class of 2023 2-year bar admission)
- Website: www.albanylaw.edu

Albany Law School is a private law school in Albany, New York. Founded in 1851, it is the oldest independent law school in the nation. It is accredited by the American Bar Association and the Middle States Commission on Higher Education. While not part of the State University of New York system, it has an affiliation agreement with University at Albany that includes a few shared programs.

== History ==
Albany Law School is the oldest independent law school in the United States. It was founded in 1851 by Amos Dean (its dean until 1868), Amasa J. Parker, Ira Harris, and others.

It is officially named Albany Law School of Union University with the Middle States Commission on Higher Education. Beginning in 1878, the Albany College of Pharmacy, Albany Law School, Albany Medical College, Dudley Observatory and Union College created the loose association today known as Union University; however, each member institution has its own governing board, is fiscally independent, and is responsible for its own programs.

Albany Law School has a historically close relationship with the New York Court of Appeals. One of the original members of the court, Greene C. Bronson, helped to found the law school. Since that time, Albany Law School alumni have been members of the court nine times with two serving as Chief Judge of the New York Court of Appeals. In addition, the school hosts the Fund for Modern Courts' Hugh R. Jones Memorial Lecture, which is typically given by a current or former member of the court.

== Employment and rankings ==
Albany Law School has repeatedly been ranked the #1 law school in the nation for government by National Jurist’s preLaw magazine, with editors writing:

“As the only law school located in New York State’s capital, Albany Law School benefits from unmatched proximity to state government institutions, including the governor’s office, legislature, courts and key agencies. We rank the law school No. 1 for Best School in Government.”

National Jurist also ranked Albany Law among the top law schools in the country for preparing students to work in government roles as part of the Government Law Honor Roll. In 2026, Albany was the only law school to receive an 'A' in the Government Law category other than Harvard Law School.

Albany Law School is well known for preparing students for law careers in public service. In 2024, over half of graduates were employed in the public service sector at non-profits and government agencies such as public defenders offices.

For the 2024 general rankings across all possible criteria, U.S. News & World Report ranked Albany Law School #117 out of all ABA-accredited law schools in the nation.

== Programs and centers ==
Albany Law School offers 14 concentrations for J.D. candidates, as well as an L.L.M program, and joint J.D./M.B.A, J.D./M.P.A., J.D./M.R.P., J.D./M.S., and J.D./M.S.W. programs.

Albany Law School's Schaffer Law Library holds a collection of more than 730,000 volumes and equivalents, including videotapes of oral arguments before the New York State Court of Appeals dating back to 1989.

== Notable alumni ==
Albany Law School has numerous notable alumni. It is one of only twelve law schools in the United States to have graduated two or more justices of the United States Supreme Court: Robert H. Jackson and David Josiah Brewer.

Nine judges of the New York State Court of Appeals and over a dozen members of the United States Congress are alumni of Albany Law.

Other notable alumni include:

- Kate Stoneman (1851), the first woman admitted to the New York State Bar
- William McKinley (1867), 25th President of the United States
- James Campbell Matthews (1870), the first African American man to graduate from law school in New York State, and later the first African American municipal judge
- Amaro Cavalcanti (1881), former justice of the Supreme Court of Brazil and the International Court of Justice at the Hague, and author of the Brazilian Constitution of 1891
- Martin H. Glynn (1894), first Irish American Roman Catholic head of government and former Governor of the State of New York
- Lawrence H. Cooke (1939), former Chief Judge of New York State
- Richard D. Parsons (1971), former Chairman of Citigroup, Time Warner CEO, and co-chair of the advisory board of the National Museum of African American History and Culture
- Thomas J. Vilsack (1975), Governor of Iowa and U.S. Secretary of Agriculture under Biden Administration
- Jeanine Pirro (1975), United States attorney for the District of Columbia, Fox News television host, and first woman to serve as a judge of the Westchester County Court
- Leslie Stein (1981), Associate Judge, New York State Court of Appeals
- Andrew Cuomo (1982), former Manhattan assistant district attorney and former Governor of the State of New York
- Lee Zeldin (2003), Administrator of the U.S. Environmental Protection Agency

== Academics ==
Albany Law School offers courses and concentrations for the following degree programs: J.D., LL.M., and M.S. It offers joint degrees with the University at Albany, Russell Sage College, Rensselaer Polytechnic Institute, Alden March Bioethics Institute at Albany Medical College, Mount Sinai School of Medicine, as well as other institutions. Albany Law School has an affiliation agreement with University at Albany that includes shared programs and access for students and faculty to learn from one another.

== Costs ==
The total annual tuition at Albany Law School is $64,234 for the 2025–2026 academic year, with an estimated annual cost of living in Albany of $21,844 (including all non-tuition related expenses, such as transportation, books, housing, food, etc.).

In 2024, Albany Law awarded $22.1 million in financial aid, and over 70% of first-year students received unconditional scholarships. Around 10% of all Albany Law School students are charged full tuition.

== Leadership and faculty ==
=== President & Dean ===
1. Amos Dean (1851–1868)
2. Issac Edwards (1868–1879)
3. Horace E. Smith (1879–1889)
4. George W. Kirchway (1889–1891)
5. Lewis B. Hall (1891–1895)
6. J. Newton Fiero (1895–1924)
7. Harold D. Alexander (1924–1945)
8. Andrew V. Clements (1945–1965)
  - J. Vanderbilt Straub (Acting) (1965)
9. Samuel M. Hesson (1965–1975)
  - John C. Welsh (Acting) (1975)
10. Ralph D. Semerad (1975–1977)
  - John C. Welsh (Acting) (1977–1979)
11. Richard J. Bartlett (1979–1985)
12. Martin Belsky (1986–1995)
13. John Baker (1991–1993)
  - John C. Welsh (Acting) (1993–1995)
14. Thomas Sponsler (1995–2002)
15. Thomas Guernsey (2002–2011)
16. Penelope Andrews (2012–2015)
17. Alicia Ouellette (2015–2023)
18. Cinnamon P. Carlarne (2023–present)

=== Notable faculty ===
Full-time faculty:

- Alicia Ouellette, president and dean emeritus
- Ira Mark Bloom, trusts, estates, and property lawyer
- Vincent M. Bonventre, judicial and constitutional law lawyer and commentator
- Raymond H. Brescia, public interest law lawyer and commentator
- Patrick M. Connors, New York civil practice and legal ethics lawyer

Adjunct faculty:

- Mae D'Agostino, United States district judge for the Northern District of New York
- Lawrence E. Kahn, senior United States district judge for the Northern District of New York
- Eleanor Stein, administrative law judge, former member of Weather Underground and Students for a Democratic Society

Former faculty:

- Penelope Andrews, dean of the faculty of law at the University of Cape Town
- Learned Hand, United States judge and legal philosopher
- Patricia Salkin, dean of Touro Law Center
- David D. Siegel, commentator on New York civil practice

== Law journals ==
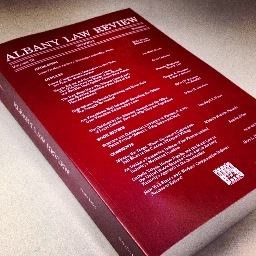

In 1875, Albany Law published the nation's first student-edited legal periodical, the Albany Law School Journal, which existed for only one academic year before being discontinued. Currently, the school publishes three journals, which are listed in order of their founding:

- Albany Law Review
- Albany Law Journal of Science and Technology
- Albany Government Law Review

== Athletics ==
Albany Law School has one of the oldest law school rugby clubs in the nation. The Albany Law School Rugby Football Club, founded in 1966, annually hosts the William Watkins tournament in the spring to honor its club founder, Professor William Watkins. Remarkably, since its inception, Albany Law is undefeated in inter-league law school rugby competition.
