= List of associate judges of the New York Court of Appeals =

This is a list of associate judges of the New York Court of Appeals, with their tenure on the court.

== Associate judges serving before 1870 ==
Judge	Years served	Party	Comment
William F. Allen	1854, 1862, 1870–1878	Democrat	
William J. Bacon	1860, 1868		
Greene Carrier Bronson	1847–1851	Democrat	
John W. Brown	1857, 1865		
Daniel Cady	1849		
William W. Campbell	1865		
George F. Comstock	1855–1861	American	Also served as Chief Judge of the New York Court of Appeals
Charles Daniels	1869		
Noah Davis	1865		
Gilbert Dean	1855		
Robert Earl	1868–1870, 1870–1894	Democrat	Also served as Chief Judge of the New York Court of Appeals
Samuel A. Foote	1851		
Addison Gardiner	1847–1855	Democrat/Anti–Rent	Also served as Chief Judge of the New York Court of Appeals
Hiram Gray	1851, 1859		
Martin Grover	1859, 1867–1870, 1870–1875	Democrat	
Augustus C. Hand	1855		
Ira Harris	1850, 1858		
Ward Hunt	1865–1870	Republican	Also served as Chief Judge of the New York Court of Appeals
Amaziah B. James	1861, 1869		
Freeborn G. Jewett	1846–1853	Democrat	
Alexander S. Johnson	1852–1859, 1873–1874	Democrat	
Samuel Jones	1847–1848		
John A. Lott	1861, 1869–1870	Democrat	
Richard P. Marvin	1855, 1863		
Charles Mason	1853, 1861, 1868–1869		
John Maynard	1850	Whig	
Theodore Miller	1868, 1875–1886	Democrat	
Joseph Mullin	1864		
Amasa J. Parker	1854		
Rufus W. Peckham Sr.	1866, 1870–1873	Democrat	
John K. Porter	1865–1867	Republican	
Daniel Pratt	1850, 1858		
Charles Herman Ruggles	1847–1855	Democrat	Also served as Chief Judge of the New York Court of Appeals
Henry R. Selden	1862–1865		
Samuel Lee Selden	1856–1862	Democrat	Also served as Chief Judge of the New York Court of Appeals
Selah B. Strong	1849, 1859		
Theron R. Strong	1858		
Josiah Sutherland	1862, 1870		
John Willard	1853	Democrat	
Lewis B. Woodruff	1868–1869	Republican	Also served on the Second U.S. Circuit Court

== Associate judges serving between 1870 and 1974 ==
Judge	Years served	Appointing Governor/Party	Comment
William F. Allen	1870–1878	Democrat	
Charles Andrews	1870–1897	Republican	Also served as Chief Judge of the New York Court of Appeals
William Shankland Andrews	1917–1928		
Edward T. Bartlett	1894–1910	Republican	
Willard Bartlett	1906–1916	Democrat	Also served as Chief Judge of the New York Court of Appeals
Francis Bergan	1964–1972	Nelson A. Rockefeller, Republican	Also served as Presiding Justice of Appellate Division of the Supreme Court, Third Judicial Department
Charles D. Breitel	1967–1978	Republican/Liberal	Also served as Chief Judge of the New York Court of Appeals
Bruce Bromley	1949	Thomas E. Dewey, Republican	
Adrian P. Burke	1955–1973	Democrat/Liberal	
Benjamin N. Cardozo	1914–1932	Democrat/Republican	Also served as Chief Judge of the New York Court of Appeals and an Associate Justice of the United States Supreme Court
Emory A. Chase	1906–1921	Frank W. Higgins, Republican	
Frederick Collin	1910–1920	Charles Evans Hughes, Republican	
Albert Conway	1940–1959	Democrat/Republican	Also served as Chief Judge of the New York Court of Appeals
Lawrence H. Cooke	1974–1984	Democrat	Also served as Chief Judge of the New York Court of Appeals
Leonard C. Crouch	1932–1936	Franklin D. Roosevelt, Democrat	
William H. Cuddeback	1913–1919	Democrat/Independence League	
Edgar M. Cullen	1900–1913	Democrat/Republican	Also served as Chief Judge of the New York Court of Appeals
George F. Danforth	1879–1889	Republican	
Charles S. Desmond	1940–1966	Democrat/Republican	Also served as Chief Judge of the New York Court of Appeals
Marvin R. Dye	1945–1965	Democrat/American Labor/Liberal	
Robert Earl	1868–1870, 1870–1894	Democrat	
Abram I. Elkus	1919–1920	Al Smith, Democrat	
Edward R. Finch	1935–1943	Democrat	
Charles J. Folger	1870–1881	Republican	Also served as Chief Judge of the New York Court of Appeals
Francis M. Finch	1880–1895		
Henry A. Foster	1870		
Sydney F. Foster	1960–1963	Nelson A. Rockefeller, Republican	Also served as Presiding Justice of Appellate Division of the Supreme Court, Third Judicial Department
Charles W. Froessel	1950–1962	Democrat/Liberal	
Jacob D. Fuchsberg	1975–1983	Democrat	
Stanley H. Fuld	1946–1973	Republican/Democrat	Also served as Chief Judge of the New York Court of Appeals
Domenick L. Gabrielli	1973–1982	Republican/Conservative	
James Gibson	1969–1972	Nelson A. Rockefeller, Republican	Also served as Presiding Justice of Appellate Division of the Supreme Court, Third Judicial Department
John Clinton Gray	1888–1913		
Martin Grover	1859, 1867–1870, 1870–1875	Democrat	
Albert Haight	1895–1912	Republican	
Samuel Hand	1878–1879		
Frank H. Hiscock	1906–1926	Republican/Progressive	Also served as Chief Judge of the New York Court of Appeals
John W. Hogan	1913–1923	Democrat	
William B. Hornblower	1914	Democrat	
Irving G. Hubbs	1929–1939	Republican	Also served as Presiding Justice of Appellate Division of the Supreme Court, Fourth Judicial Department
Matthew J. Jasen	1968–1985		
Alexander S. Johnson	1852–1859, 1873–1874	Democrat	
Hugh R. Jones	1973–1984	Republican/Conservative	
Kenneth B. Keating	1965–1969	Republican	Also served as U.S. Senator from New York
Henry T. Kellogg	1927–1934		
Irving Lehman	1923–1945	Democrat/Republican/American Labor	Also served as Chief Judge of the New York Court of Appeals
Edmund H. Lewis	1940–1954	Republican/Democrat/Liberal	Also served as Chief Judge of the New York Court of Appeals
John T. Loughran	1934–1953	Democrat/Republican/American Labor/Liberal	Also served as Chief Judge of the New York Court of Appeals
Celora E. Martin	1896–1904	Republican	
Isaac H. Maynard	1892–1893		
Chester B. McLaughlin	1918–1926	Charles S. Whitman, Republican	
George Z. Medalie	1945–1946	Thomas E. Dewey, Republican	Also served as U.S. Attorney for the Southern District of New York
Nathan Lewis Miller	1913–1915	Republican	Also served as Governor of New York
Theodore Miller	1868, 1875–1886	Democrat	
Denis O'Brien	1889–1907	Democrat	Also served as New York Attorney General
John F. O'Brien	1927–1934	Al Smith, Democrat	
Rufus W. Peckham Jr.	1886–1895	Democrat	Also served as an Associate Justice of the United States Supreme Court
Rufus W. Peckham Sr.	1866, 1870–1873	Democrat	
Cuthbert W. Pound	1915–1934	Republican/Democrat	Also served as Chief Judge of the New York Court of Appeals
Samuel Rabin	1974	Malcolm Wilson, Republican	Also served as Presiding Justice of Appellate Division of the Supreme Court, Second Judicial Department
Charles A. Rapallo	1870–1887	Democrat	
Harlan W. Rippey	1937–1944	Democrat	
John F. Scileppi	1963–1972	Democrat/Liberal	
Samuel Seabury	1914–1916	Democrat/Progressive/Independence League/American	
Charles B. Sears	1940	Herbert H. Lehman, Democrat	Also served as Presiding Justice of Appellate Division of the Supreme Court, Fourth Judicial Department
Harold A. Stevens	1974	Malcolm Wilson, Republican	Also served as Presiding Justice of Appellate Division of the Supreme Court, First Judicial Department
Thomas D. Thacher	1943–1948	Thomas E. Dewey, Republican	Also served as Solicitor General of the United States and as a U.S. District Court for the Southern District of New York
Benjamin F. Tracy	1881–1882	Alonzo B. Cornell, Republican	Also served as the United States Attorney for the Eastern District of New York and the United States Secretary of the Navy
Irving G. Vann	1895–1912	Levi P. Morton, Republican	
John Van Voorhis	1953–1967	Thomas E. Dewey, Republican	
Sol Wachtler	1973–1992	Republican	Also served as Chief Judge of the New York Court of Appeals
William E. Werner	1900–1916	Republican/Democrat	

== Associate judges serving since 1974 ==
Judge	Years served	Appointing Governor/Party	Comment
Sheila Abdus-Salaam	2013–2017	Andrew Cuomo, Democrat	
Fritz W. Alexander II	1985–1992	Mario Cuomo, Democrat	
Joseph W. Bellacosa	1987–2000	Mario Cuomo, Democrat	
Charles D. Breitel	1967–1978	Republican/Liberal	Also served as Chief Judge of the New York Court of Appeals
Anthony Cannataro	2021–	Andrew Cuomo, Democrat	
Carmen Beauchamp Ciparick	1994–2012	Mario Cuomo, Democrat	
Lawrence H. Cooke	1974–1984	Democrat	Also served as Chief Judge of the New York Court of Appeals
Eugene M. Fahey	2015–2021	Andrew Cuomo, Democrat	
Paul G. Feinman	2017–2021	Andrew Cuomo, Democrat	
Jacob D. Fuchsberg	1975–1983	Democrat	
Domenick L. Gabrielli	1973–1982	Republican/Conservative	
Michael J. Garcia	2016–	Andrew Cuomo, Democrat	
Victoria A. Graffeo	2000–2014	George Pataki, Republican	Also served as Solicitor General for the State of New York
Caitlin Halligan	2023–	Kathy Hochul, Democrat	
Stewart F. Hancock Jr.	1986–1993	Mario Cuomo, Democrat	
Matthew J. Jasen	1968–1985		
Hugh R. Jones	1973–1984	Republican/Conservative	
Theodore T. Jones	2007–2012	Eliot Spitzer, Democrat	
Judith S. Kaye	1983–2008	Mario Cuomo, Democrat	Also served as Chief Judge of the New York Court of Appeals
Howard A. Levine	1993–2002	Mario Cuomo, Democrat	
Bernard S. Meyer	1979–1986	Hugh L. Carey, Democrat	
Eugene F. Pigott Jr.	2006–2016	George Pataki, Republican	Also served as Presiding Justice of New York Supreme Court, Appellate Division, Fourth Department
Susan Phillips Read	2003–2015	George Pataki, Republican	
Jenny Rivera	2013–	Andrew Cuomo, Democrat	
Albert Rosenblatt	1998–2007	George Pataki, Republican	
Richard D. Simons	1983–1997	Mario Cuomo, Democrat	
Madeline Singas	2021–	Andrew Cuomo, Democrat	
George Bundy Smith	1992–2006	Mario Cuomo, Democrat	
Robert S. Smith	2004–2014	George Pataki, Republican	
Leslie E. Stein	2015–2021	Andrew Cuomo, Democrat	
Vito J. Titone	1985–1998	Mario Cuomo, Democrat	
Shirley Troutman	2022–	Kathy Hochul, Democrat	
Sol Wachtler	1973–1992	Republican	Also served as Chief Judge of the New York Court of Appeals
Richard C. Wesley	1997–2003	George Pataki, Republican	Subsequently appointed to the U.S. Court of Appeals for the Second Circuit
Rowan D. Wilson	2017–2023	Andrew Cuomo, Democrat	Subsequently appointed as Chief Judge of the New York Court of Appeals

== See also ==
- List of chief judges of the New York Court of Appeals
- Judiciary of New York
- New York Constitution
- Government of New York state
- Court of Appeals of New York
