= Caitlin Halligan =

American judge (born 1966)

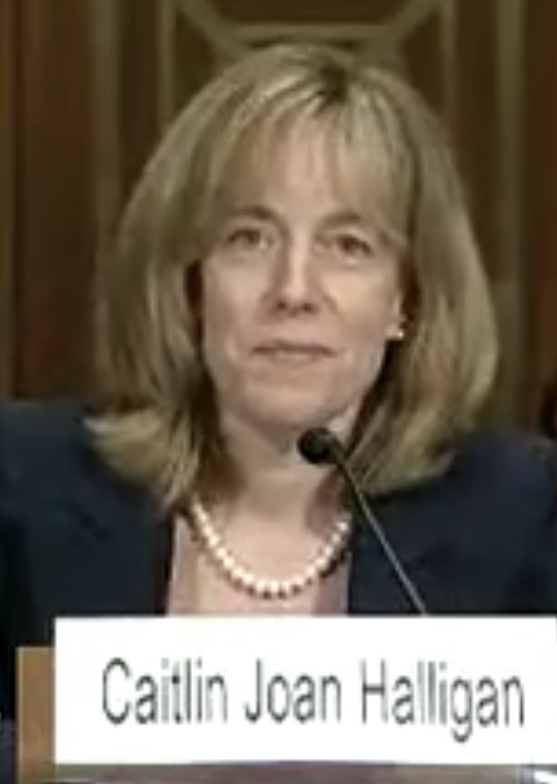
- Halligan in 2011

Associate Judge of the New York Court of Appeals
- Incumbent
- Assumed office April 19, 2023
- Appointed by: Kathy Hochul
- Preceded by: Rowan D. Wilson

Solicitor General of New York
- In office September 24, 2001 – January 1, 2007
- Governor: George Pataki
- Preceded by: Preeta Bansal
- Succeeded by: Barbara Underwood

Personal details
- Born: December 14, 1966 (age 59) Xenia, Ohio, U.S.
- Party: Democratic
- Education: Princeton University (BA); Georgetown University (JD)

Caitlin Joan Halligan (born December 14, 1966) is an American lawyer who has served as an associate judge of the New York Court of Appeals since April 2023. She served as Solicitor General of New York from 2001 until 2007. President Barack Obama nominated her several times to fill a vacancy on the United States Court of Appeals for the District of Columbia Circuit, but the U.S. Senate did not vote directly on the nomination, and in March 2013, Obama withdrew the nomination at her request.

== Early life and education ==
Halligan was born in Xenia, Ohio on December 14, 1966, to teachers John J. Halligan Jr. and Christine H. Smith.

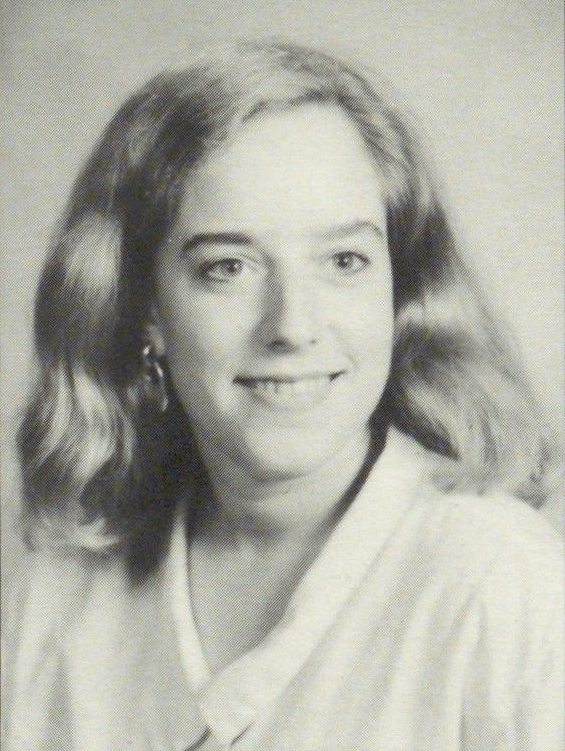
Halligan in the Princeton University yearbook, 1988

Halligan graduated cum laude with a B.A. in history from Princeton University in 1988 after completing a 123-page long senior thesis titled "Origins and Development of Labor Radicalism in Pullman, Illinois, 1881–1894." She then received a J.D. magna cum laude from Georgetown University Law Center in 1995. She was the managing editor of the Georgetown Law Journal (1994–1995).

Before law school, Halligan served as a legislative aide for U.S. Rep. William Vollie Alexander Jr., and as a policy associate at Georgians for Children, a non-profit organization devoted to improving state policies for families and children. Halligan also taught writing, American history, and American literature at a university in Wuhan, China, through the Princeton in Asia program.

== Career ==
After law school, Halligan served as a law clerk, first for United States Court of Appeals for the District of Columbia Circuit Judge Patricia Wald and then for Justice Stephen Breyer of the Supreme Court of the United States.

After her clerkships, Halligan served as an associate with Howard, Smith & Levin LLP (now merged with Covington & Burling). She then spent eight years with the New York Attorney General's Office. From 1999 to 2000, she served as the first Chief of the Office's Internet Bureau, where she developed and coordinated statewide law enforcement and policy initiatives regarding online consumer fraud, privacy, online securities trading, and other Internet-related issues. Halligan served as First Deputy Solicitor General in 2001, and then served as Solicitor General from 2001 until 2007.

Halligan has served as adjunct faculty at Columbia Law School since 2005.

After leaving the Solicitor General's office in 2007, Halligan joined the law firm Weil, Gotshal & Manges to head up its appellate practice.

In 2009, Nina Totenberg of National Public Radio included Halligan's name on a list of possible nominees to the U.S. Supreme Court.

In early 2010, Halligan left Weil Gotshal to join the Manhattan district attorney's office as its general counsel.

In March 2014, Halligan joined Gibson Dunn in New York as one of the firm's Appellate & Constitutional Law Practice Group leaders. Halligan represented Chevron in a landmark climate case against Steven Donziger using the civil provisions of RICO law to shield corporations from having to pay environmental damages. In March 2019, she joined the firm Selendy & Gay.

Halligan has argued six cases before the U.S. Supreme Court.

== Judicial career ==
=== Expired nomination to the D.C. Circuit ===
On May 26, 2010, legal blogger Ed Whelan reported that President Obama has placed Halligan on "the inside track" to be nominated to one of two vacancies on the United States Court of Appeals for the District of Columbia Circuit. In July 2010, the Blog of Legal Times reported that two unidentified lawyers said agents with the Federal Bureau of Investigation had interviewed them regarding Halligan, which is standard for federal judicial nominees and often is precursor to a nomination. On September 29, 2010, Obama nominated Halligan to replace John G. Roberts. On December 22, 2010, the Senate returned the nomination to the President, having taken no action on the nomination in the One Hundred and Eleventh Congress.

On January 5, 2011, President Obama renominated Halligan for the same post. On February 2, 2011, the Senate Judiciary Committee held a hearing on her nomination and on March 10, 2011, the Judiciary Committee reported her nomination to the floor favorably, in a 10–8 vote. On December 6, 2011, the Senate failed to invoke cloture in a 54–45 vote, falling six votes short of the 60 votes needed to move forward with a floor vote on her nomination. Her nomination was returned to the President on December 17, 2011, pursuant to the rules of the Senate.

Halligan was renominated on June 11, 2012. Two more attempts to gain cloture on her confirmation failed, and on August 3, 2012, her nomination was again returned to the White House. She was renominated on September 19, 2012. Her nomination was again returned to the President on January 2, 2013, due to the sine die adjournment of the Senate.

On January 3, 2013, she was renominated to the same office. Her nomination was reported by the Senate Judiciary Committee on February 14, 2013, initially in a 10–8 vote, strictly along party lines. However, Sen. Lindsey Graham later changed his vote to "pass," making the final committee vote 10–7.

On March 4, 2013, Senate Majority Leader Harry Reid again filed a motion to invoke cloture on Halligan's nomination. On March 6, 2013, cloture failed by a vote of 51 ayes to 41 nays. According to Senator Charles E. Grassley, one objection of Republicans to the nominee was based on the legal theory she advanced while Solicitor General of New York, which was that "gun manufacturers, wholesalers and retailers contributed to a 'public nuisance' of illegal handguns in the state."

On March 22, 2013, Halligan requested that Obama withdraw the nomination and he did so.

=== Appointment to the New York Court of Appeals ===
Halligan was one of seven candidates under consideration for appointment to the New York Court of Appeals after the retirement of Judge Paul Feinman on March 23, 2021.

On March 24, 2023, Halligan was again selected as a finalist under consideration for appointment to the New York Court of Appeals, this time for the position of Chief Judge following the retirement of Chief Judge Janet DiFiore and the subsequent rejection of Justice Hector LaSalle's nomination to that seat by the New York State Senate.

On April 10, 2023, Governor Kathy Hochul announced her intention to nominate Halligan as an associate judge of the New York Court of Appeals, replacing Rowan D. Wilson, who was nominated for chief judge on the same day. On April 19, the New York Senate confirmed Halligan as associate judge by a vote of 47–12, she took her oath the same day.

== Personal ==
Halligan married Marc C. Falcone, the son of former New York Times food critic, Mimi Sheraton, in a civil ceremony on January 22, 1999. The couple has one daughter and live in Manhattan's West Village neighborhood. Halligan is an avid runner and has been a member of the New York Road Runners club.

== See also ==
- Barack Obama Supreme Court candidates
- Barack Obama judicial appointment controversies
- List of law clerks for the second seat of the Supreme Court of the United States

Legal offices
Preceded by Preeta Bansal	Solicitor General of New York; 2001–2007	Succeeded by Barbara Underwood
Preceded by Rowan D. Wilson	Associate Judge of the New York Court of Appeals; 2023–present	Incumbent
