= Shirley Troutman =

American judge (born 1959 or 1960)

Associate Judge of the New York Court of Appeals
- Incumbent
- Assumed office January 12, 2022
- Appointed by: Kathy Hochul
- Preceded by: Eugene M. Fahey

Personal details
- Born: 1959 or 1960 (age 66–67)
- Party: Democratic
- Education: State University of New York, Buffalo (BS); Albany Law School (JD)

Shirley Troutman (born 1959 or 1960) is an American lawyer and jurist who has served as an associate judge of the New York Court of Appeals since 2022. She served as an associate justice of the New York Supreme Court, Appellate Division from 2016 to 2022.

== Education ==
Troutman received her Bachelor of Science from State University of New York at Buffalo in 1982 and her Juris Doctor from Albany Law School of Union University.

== Career ==
During her legal career, Troutman served as an Assistant United States Attorney for the Western District of New York, as an assistant attorney general for the State of New York and an assistant district attorney for Erie County. She has served as an adjunct professor at University at Buffalo Law School and the Buffalo State College.

=== Judicial service ===
Troutman was elected to the Buffalo City Court in 1994. She then served as a judge of the Erie County Court from 2003 to 2009. She later served as a justice of the Supreme Court, 8th Judicial District from 2010 to 2016. In February 2016, Governor Andrew Cuomo appointed Troutman to the New York Supreme Court, Appellate Division, Fourth Department.

==== New York Court of Appeals service ====
In April 2021, Troutman was one of seven nominees recommended to Governor Andrew Cuomo to fill the vacancy left by the retirement of Judge Leslie Stein; that seat was eventually filled by Madeline Singas. On November 24, 2021, Governor Kathy Hochul nominated Troutman to the seat on the New York Court of Appeals vacated by Judge Eugene M. Fahey when he retired on December 31, 2021. The Senate confirmed her on January 12, 2022. Her formal investiture ceremony took place on April 5, 2022. Troutman is the second African-American woman to serve on the state court of appeals. On March 24, 2023, Troutman was selected as a finalist under consideration for appointment to the New York Court of Appeals, this time for the position of chief judge following the retirement of Chief Judge Janet DiFiore and the subsequent rejection of Justice Hector LaSalle's nomination to that seat by the New York State Senate.

Legal offices
Preceded by Eugene M. Fahey	Associate Judge of the New York Court of Appeals; 2022–present	Incumbent
