= Harry Taylor (1890s first baseman) =

American baseball player (1866–1955)

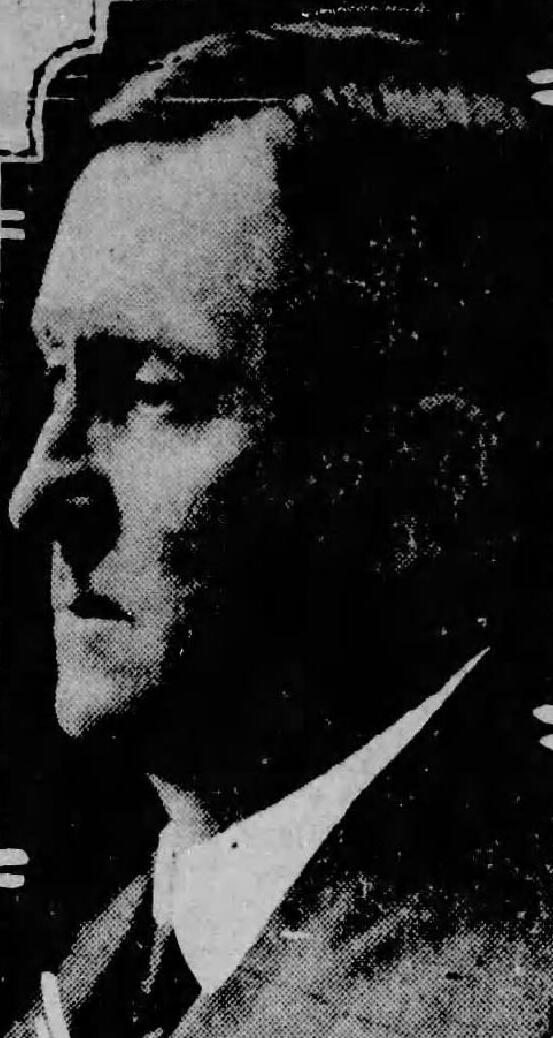
- Taylor circa 1926
- First baseman
- Born: April 4, 1866; Halsey Valley, New York, U.S.
- Died: July 12, 1955 (aged 89); Buffalo, New York, U.S.
- Batted: Left Threw: Unknown

MLB debut
- April 18, 1890, for the Louisville Colonels

Last MLB appearance
- September 29, 1893, for the Baltimore Orioles

MLB statistics
- Batting average: .286
- Home runs: 3
- Runs batted in: 176
- Stats at Baseball Reference

Teams
- Louisville Colonels (1890–1892); Baltimore Orioles (1893)

Harry Taylor

Associate Justice of the Fourth Judicial Department
- In office 1924–1936
- Appointed by: Al Smith

Harry Leonard Taylor (April 4, 1866 – July 12, 1955) was an American professional baseball player who played for the American Association's Louisville Colonels and the National League's Baltimore Orioles.

Taylor played baseball at Cornell University before finishing his undergraduate degree in 1888.

After playing well in the minor leagues, Taylor reached the major leagues; he was signed on 23 October 1889 by the Louisville Colonels. The Colonels were coming off a horrendous season in which they'd finished in last place in the American Association, but the 1890 Louisville Colonels season made history; the team won the league championship, thereby becoming the first major league team to go from last place to first place in the span of a single year. The club's historic achievement is celebrated in The 1890 Louisville Cyclones, a 2026 book written by Perry T. Cooper and published by McFarland & Company, Publishers. Harry Taylor was the club's starting first baseman, and he played very well, hitting .306 and helping the club win its unexpected championship. He played in every one of the Louisville club's games in 1890.

During his baseball career, Taylor attended Cornell Law School each offseason. Oddly, despite the fact that he was a professional player (his career as a major league player didn't end until October 1893), in January 1893 he was named captain of Cornell's baseball team. After law school, he began practicing law in Buffalo, New York. In the early twentieth century, he was president of the International League, then known as the Eastern League. In 1906, Taylor was appointed to the county court of Erie County by Governor Frank W. Higgins. In 1913, he was elected to the Supreme Court for Erie County. However, before he could complete his term, he was appointed to the New York Supreme Court, Appellate Division, Fourth Department by Governor Al Smith in 1924.

Harry Taylor died at age 89 in Buffalo, New York. He was a lifelong bachelor.
