= New York Supreme Court, Appellate Division, Fourth Department =

Court in New York State

Coordinates: 43°9′27″N 77°36′10″W

Supreme Court of the State of New York, Appellate Division, Fourth Judicial Department
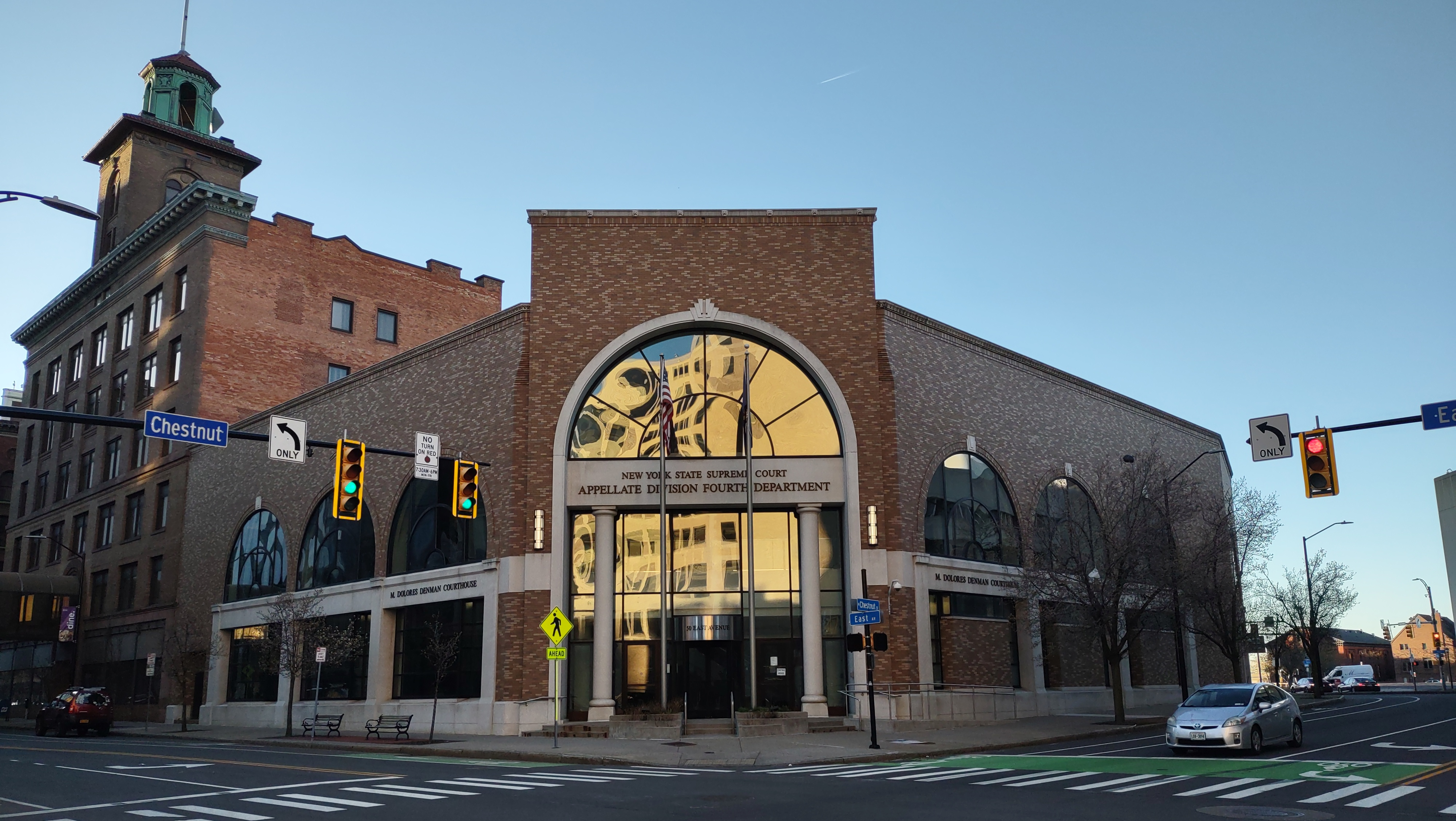
- M. Dolores Denman Courthouse
- Interactive map of Supreme Court of the State of New York, Appellate Division, Fourth Judicial Department
- Established: 1894
- Location: Rochester, New York
- Composition method: Gubernatorial appointment
- Authorised by: Constitution of the State of New York
- Appeals to: New York Court of Appeals
- Website: www.nycourts.gov/courts/ad4/

The Supreme Court of the State of New York, Appellate Division, Fourth Judicial Department, or simply the Fourth Department, is one of the four geographical components of the New York Supreme Court, Appellate Division, the intermediate appellate court of the State of New York. Its courthouse is located in Rochester, New York.

== Jurisdiction ==
The Fourth Department of the Appellate Division holds jurisdiction over 22 counties in Central and Western New York State, and includes the cities of Buffalo, Rochester, and Syracuse. Geographically, the Fourth Department extends from the St. Lawrence River in the north to the Pennsylvania border in the south and from the Mohawk Valley in the east to Lake Erie and the Province of Ontario to the west.

Appeals are taken to the Appellate Division, as a matter of right, in civil and criminal cases, from the Supreme Court, Surrogate's Court, Family Court, and Court of Claims.

Along with the state's other three Appellate Departments, it shares responsibility for all admissions to the New York bar. Under the state's bar admission rules, all bar applicants must be interviewed in person by one of the Appellate Departments. Once admitted by one department, a new attorney may practice in any New York state court. The Court is also responsible for oversight of attorney conduct, as well as the administration of special protections for minors and the incapacitated within the Department.

== Presiding justices ==
- George A. Hardin 1895–1899
- William II. Adams 1899–1903
- Peter Baillie McLennan 1903–1913
- Frederick W. Kruse 1913–1922
- Irving G. Hubbs 1923–1928
- Charles Brown Sears 1929–1940
- Harley N. Crosby 1940–1943
- Benjamin B. Cunningham 1944
- Marsh N. Taylor 1945–1953
- Francis D. McCurn 1953–1959
- Alger A. Williams 1960–1968
- Earle C. Bastow 1968
- Harry D. Goldman 1969–1973
- John S. Marsh 1973–1978
- Michael F. Dillon 1979–1991
- M. Dolores Denman 1991–1999
- Eugene F. Pigott Jr. 2000–2006
- Henry J. Scudder 2006–2015
- Gerald J. Whalen 2016–present

== See also ==
- New York Court of Appeals
- New York State Supreme Court, Appellate Division, First Department
- New York State Supreme Court, Appellate Division, Second Department
