= People v. LaValle =

Landmark decision by New York Court of Appeals that ended capital punishment in New York

- Court: New York Court of Appeals
- Full case name: The People of New York v. Stephen S. LaValle
- Decided: June 24, 2004
- Citation: 3 N.Y.3d 88

Case history
- Prior history: Defendant convicted, N.Y. Sup. Ct. Suffolk Co.

Holding
- The current statute of capital punishment in the state of New York was unconstitutional as it violated article one, section six of the state constitution.

Court membership
- Chief judge: Judith Kaye
- Associate judges: Robert S. Smith, George Bundy Smith, Carmen Beauchamp Ciparick, Albert Rosenblatt, Victoria A. Graffeo, Susan Phillips Read

Case opinions
- Majority: G. Smith, joined by Kaye, Ciparick
- Concurrence: Rosenblatt
- Dissent: R. Smith, joined by Graffeo, Read

Laws applied
- N.Y. Const. art. I, § 6; N.Y. C.P.L. § 400.27(10)

People v. LaValle, 3 N.Y.3d 88 (2004), was a landmark decision by the New York Court of Appeals, the highest court in the U.S. state of New York, in which the court ruled that the state's death penalty statute was unconstitutional because of the statute's direction on how the jury was to be instructed in case of deadlock. New York has since then abandoned the death penalty, as the law has not been amended.

== Background of the case ==
Stephen LaValle, a paroled sex offender who raped, sexually molested, and murdered high-school track coach Cynthia Quinn (stabbed seventy-three times with a screwdriver) during her Sunday morning jog on May 31, 1997, was tried and convicted by a lower court of first degree murder. The Supreme Court of Suffolk County sentenced him to death in August 1999. LaValle largely argued the case himself (despite a complete lack of legal training), after a falling out between him and his two attorneys; they wanted to take the case in different directions. The case was eventually appealed to the highest court in New York State.

== Court of Appeals decision ==
LaValle argued that his death sentence had been improperly imposed on two grounds. First, he alleged that one of the jurors (juror 16) had been biased against him from the beginning, and that during voir dire the juror had expressed an inclination towards assigning the death penalty to rapists and murderers. LaValle also argued that the emotional testimony of Quinn's husband was largely irrelevant to the case, and served only to earn him a harsher sentence from the jury.

While the court upheld LaValle's conviction, citing "overwhelming evidence of guilt" to support it (largely based on LaValle's own confession as well as eyewitness testimony), the court did invalidate the death sentence, on the grounds that it violated Article 1, Section 6 of the New York Constitution.

The Court held that Section 400.27(10) of the New York Criminal Procedure Law was unconstitutional. That section addressed what would happen if a jury deadlocked on the penalty to be imposed: life without the possibility of parole, or death. In that circumstance, the trial judge would be empowered to sentence the defendant to as little as 20 years to life or as much as life without parole. Moreover, the statute required the judge to instruct the jury as to what would occur if they deadlocked.

The Court found that such an instruction could have a coercive effect on jurors who believed life without parole was the appropriate sentence, but feared that if they stuck to their vote and a deadlock resulted the defendant could be eligible for parole in as little as twenty years. This potential for coercion violated the due process clause of the New York State Constitution. The court further held that some instruction as to the consequence of deadlock was required by the due process clause, but that it was for the legislature, not the court, to provide a new instruction.

== Effects ==
The court remanded the case to the Supreme Court of Suffolk County with instructions that a new sentence be imposed: either 20 or 25 years to life, or life imprisonment without eligibility for parole. LaValle was resentenced to life in prison without parole. The death sentences of New York's other two death-row inmates were also invalidated.

In April 2007, there were talks by state officials of the Republican Party, notably the then-State Senate Majority Leader Joseph Bruno, to reinstate a state death penalty that permits its usage for "cop-killers." Eliot Spitzer, the governor at the time, expressed agreement with the intention of the legislation, but did not actually express support for passing it. Then-lieutenant-governor David Paterson did not take a position, but according to state senator Liz Krueger, Paterson has always been against capital punishment.

In October 2007, the New York Court of Appeals decided People v. John Taylor which involved the last inmate on New York's Death Row (see Wendy's massacre). In that case, the District Attorney of Queens County sought to carve an exception to Lavalle, but the court rejected that effort.
