= Second Department =

Second Department may refer to:

- Second Department of Polish General Staff, Poland's military intelligence arm, 1918–1939
- New York Supreme Court, Appellate Division, Second Department
