= Rowan D. Wilson =

American judge (born 1960)

Rowan Wilson
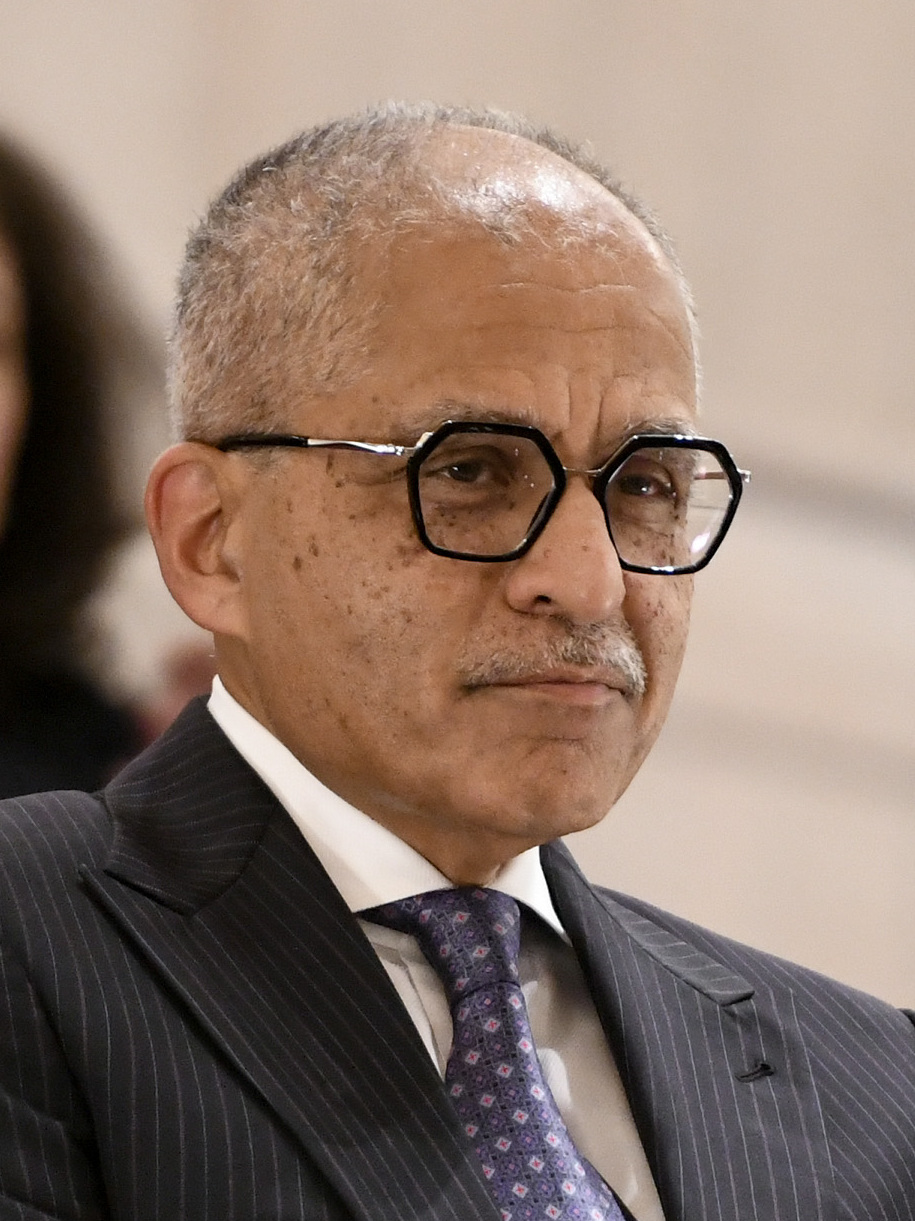
- Wilson in 2023

Chief Judge of the New York Court of Appeals
- Incumbent
- Assumed office April 18, 2023
- Appointed by: Kathy Hochul
- Preceded by: Anthony Cannataro (acting)

Associate Judge of the New York Court of Appeals
- In office June 1, 2017 – April 18, 2023
- Appointed by: Andrew Cuomo
- Preceded by: Eugene F. Pigott Jr.
- Succeeded by: Caitlin Halligan

Personal details
- Born: September 3, 1960 (age 65) Pomona, California, U.S.
- Party: Democratic
- Education: Harvard University (BA, JD)

Rowan D. Wilson (born September 3, 1960) is an American judge who has served as a judge of the New York Court of Appeals since 2017 and as chief judge of that court since 2023. He is the first African-American to serve as chief judge of the New York Court of Appeals.

== Early life and education ==
Wilson was born on September 3, 1960 in Pomona, California and grew up in Berkeley, California. His parents were schoolteachers. Wilson graduated from Harvard College in 1981 with a Bachelor of Arts, cum laude, and from Harvard Law School in 1984 with a Juris Doctor, cum laude. At Harvard Law, he was an editor of the Harvard Civil Rights–Civil Liberties Law Review. His mother was diagnosed with breast cancer; she died while he was a student at Harvard.

== Career ==
After serving a two-year term as law clerk to James R. Browning, Chief Judge of the United States Court of Appeals for the Ninth Circuit, Wilson started working as an attorney at Cravath, Swaine & Moore in 1986. He became a partner at the firm in 1991 and spent 30 years as a litigator there. During his time at Cravath, Swaine & Moore, Wilson headed the firm’s pro bono practice and represented the law firm as a trustee at the Lawyers' Committee for Civil Rights Under Law. Wilson was also the chair of the Neighborhood Defender Services of Harlem, providing legal representation to indigent residents of New York.

Wilson was nominated as an associate judge of the New York Court of Appeals by Governor Andrew Cuomo on January 15, 2017 and was confirmed by the New York State Senate on February 6, 2017. He was sworn in as a judge of the Court of Appeals on June 1, 2017.

On March 24, 2023, Wilson was selected as a finalist under consideration for appointment to the New York Court of Appeals, this time for the position of chief judge following the retirement of Chief Judge Janet DiFiore and the subsequent rejection of Justice Hector LaSalle's nomination to that seat by the New York State Senate. On April 10, 2023, Governor Kathy Hochul announced Wilson's nomination for Chief Judge of the New York Court of Appeals. On April 18, the New York State Senate confirmed Wilson as Chief Judge by a vote of 40–19. Wilson was sworn in as chief judge on September 12, 2023. He is the first African-American to serve as chief judge of the New York Court of Appeals.

According to Reuters, Wilson "is viewed as a liberal and has issued rulings favorable to civil rights, unions and criminal defendants". Professor Vincent Bonventre of Albany Law School has stated that Wilson is "known for his intellectual heft and his dissents, which often oppose the government and business interests". Wilson has described himself as a "progressive pragmatist".

In 2022, Wilson penned a dissenting opinion in which he argued that the court should not have dismissed a habeas corpus petition that was filed in an effort to obtain an elephant's release from the Bronx Zoo.

== Personal life ==
Wilson is married to Grace Wilson.

== See also ==
- List of African-American jurists

Legal offices
Preceded by Eugene F. Pigott Jr.	Associate Judge of the New York Court of Appeals; 2017–2023	Succeeded by Caitlin Halligan
Preceded by Anthony Cannataro; Acting	Chief Judge of the New York Court of Appeals; 2023–present	Incumbent
