= Theodore Olson =

American lawyer (1940–2024)

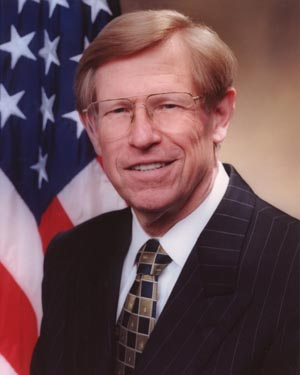
- Official portrait, c. 2001

42nd Solicitor General of the United States
- In office June 11, 2001 – July 10, 2004
- President: George W. Bush
- Preceded by: Seth P. Waxman
- Succeeded by: Paul Clement

United States Assistant Attorney General for the Office of Legal Counsel
- In office 1981–1984
- President: Ronald Reagan
- Preceded by: John Harmon
- Succeeded by: Charles Cooper

Personal details
- Born: Theodore Bevry Olson; September 11, 1940 Chicago, Illinois, U.S.
- Died: November 13, 2024 (aged 84) Falls Church, Virginia, U.S.
- Party: Republican
- Spouses: Karen Beatie (m. 1964; div. 1986) Jolie Bales (m. 1987; div. 1990) Barbara Bracher (m. 1996; died 2001) Lady Booth (m. 2006)
- Education: University of the Pacific (BA); University of California, Berkeley (JD)

Theodore Bevry Olson (September 11, 1940 – November 13, 2024) was an American lawyer who served as the 42nd solicitor general of the United States from 2001 to 2004 in the administration of President George W. Bush. He previously served as the Assistant Attorney General of the Office of Legal Counsel of the U.S. Department of Justice from 1981 to 1984 under President Ronald Reagan, and he was also a longtime partner at the law firm Gibson Dunn.

== Early life and education ==
Olson was born on September 11, 1940, in Chicago, the son of Yvonne Lucy (née Bevry) and Lester W. Olson. He grew up in Mountain View, California, in the San Francisco Bay Area. After graduating from Los Altos High School in 1958, he studied communications and history at the University of the Pacific, where he was a charter member of the Phi Kappa Tau fraternity chapter. He graduated in 1962 with a Bachelor of Arts, cum laude. He then attended the UC Berkeley School of Law, where he was a member of the California Law Review and campaigned for Republican Senator Barry Goldwater for president in 1964. He graduated in 1965 with Order of the Coif membership.

== Legal career ==
=== Early legal career: 1965 to 2000 ===
In 1965, Olson joined the Los Angeles office of Gibson, Dunn & Crutcher as an associate. In 1972, he was named a partner. From 1981 to 1984, Olson served as an Assistant Attorney General (Office of Legal Counsel) in the Ronald Reagan administration. While serving in the Reagan administration, Olson was Legal Counsel to President Reagan during the Iran-Contra Affair's investigation phase. Olson was also the Assistant Attorney General for the Office of Legal Counsel when then-President Ronald Reagan ordered the Administrator of the EPA to withhold documents on the ground that they contained "enforcement sensitive information."

This led to an investigation by the U.S. House Judiciary Committee that later produced a report suggesting Olson had given false and misleading testimony before a House subcommittee during the investigation. The Judiciary Committee forwarded a copy of the report to the Attorney General, requesting the appointment of an independent counsel investigation. Olson argued that the Independent Counsel took executive powers away from the office of the President of the United States and created a hybrid "fourth branch" of government that was ultimately answerable to no one. He argued that the broad powers of the Independent Counsel could be easily abused or corrupted by partisanship. In the United States Supreme Court Case Morrison v. Olson, the Court disagreed with Olson and found in favor of the Plaintiff and independent counsel Alexia Morrison.

Olson returned to private law practice as a partner in the Washington, D.C., office of his firm, Gibson Dunn. A high-profile client of his in the 1980s was Jonathan Pollard, who had been convicted of selling government secrets to Israel. Olson handled the appeal to United States Court of Appeals for the D.C. Circuit. Olson argued the life sentence Pollard received was in violation of the plea bargain agreement, which had specifically excluded a life sentence. Olson also argued that the violation of the plea bargain was grounds for a mistrial. The Court of Appeals ruled (2‑1) that no grounds for mistrial existed. Olson argued a dozen cases before the Supreme Court prior to becoming Solicitor General. In one case, he argued against federal sentencing guidelines, and, in a case in New York state he defended a member of the press who had first leaked the Anita Hill story.

Olson successfully represented presidential candidate George W. Bush in the Supreme Court case Bush v. Gore, which effectively ended the recount of the contested 2000 U.S. presidential election. On December 11, 2000, Olson personally delivered the oral arguments before the Supreme Court on behalf of Bush.

=== Later legal career: After 2000 ===
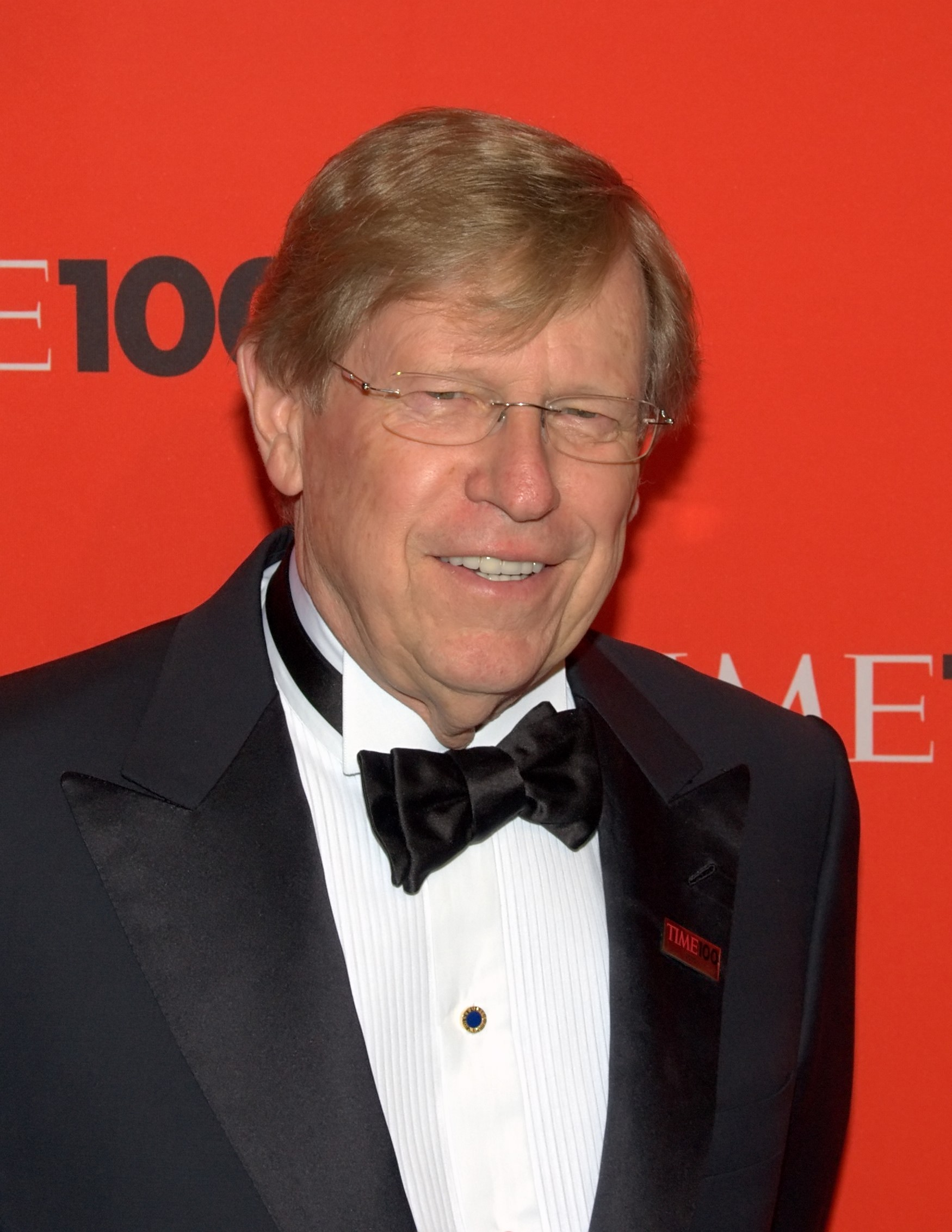
Olson in 2010

Olson was nominated for the office of Solicitor General by President Bush on February 14, 2001. He was confirmed by the United States Senate on May 24, 2001, and took office on June 11, 2001. Olson was solicitor general during the 9/11 terrorist attacks, and his wife died on board American Airlines Flight 77, which was crashed into the Pentagon. In 2002, Olson argued for the federal government in the Supreme Court case Christopher v. Harbury (536 U.S. 403), in which Supreme Court agreed with Olson's position in its unanimous opinion written by Justice Souter. Olson maintained that the government had an inherent right to lie: "There are lots of different situations where the government quite legitimately may have reasons to give false information out."

In July 2004, Olson retired as Solicitor General and returned to private practice at the Washington office of Gibson Dunn. In 2006, Olson represented a defendant journalist in the civil case filed by Wen Ho Lee and pursued the appeal to the Supreme Court. Lee sued the federal government to discover which public officials had named him as a suspect to journalists before he had been charged. Olson wrote a brief on behalf of one of the journalists involved in the case, saying that journalists should not have to identify confidential sources, even if subpoenaed by a court. In 2011, Olson represented the National Football League Players Association in the 2011 NFL lockout.

In 2009, Olson joined with President Bill Clinton's former attorney David Boies, who was also his opposing counsel in Bush v. Gore, to bring a federal lawsuit, Perry v. Schwarzenegger, challenging Proposition 8, a California state constitutional amendment banning same-sex marriage. His work on the lawsuit earned him a place among the Time 100's greatest thinkers. In 2010, Olson and Floyd Abrams argued in favor of the Citizens United vs FEC case before the Supreme Court, which granted corporations the same free speech rights as individuals, and allowed unlimited corporate spending in elections. In 2011, Olson and David Boies were awarded the ABA Medal, the highest award of the American Bar Association. In 2014, Olson received the Golden Plate Award of the American Academy of Achievement presented by Awards Council member Brendan V. Sullivan, Jr.

Apple Inc. hired Olson to fight the FBI–Apple encryption dispute court order to unlock an iPhone, which ended with the government withdrawing its case. Olson also represented New England Patriots quarterback Tom Brady in the Deflategate scandal, which ended with Brady electing not to pursue Supreme Court appeal of a four-game suspension. In 2017, Olson represented a group of billboard advertisers in a lawsuit against the City of San Francisco. The group challenged a city law requiring soda companies to include in their advertisements warnings that consumption of sugar-sweetened beverages is associated with serious health risks like diabetes. The suit claimed that the law is an unconstitutional restriction on commercial speech. In September 2017, a panel of the 9th Circuit Court of Appeals agreed with Olson and provisionally barred the city's mandated warnings.

In March 2018, Olson turned down an offer to represent Donald Trump in the probe of Russian interference in the 2016 election. In November 2019, Olson represented the DACA recipients in the Supreme court case Department of Homeland Security v. Regents of the University of California. On June 18, the Supreme Court upheld the program due to the failure of the Trump administration to follow the Administrative Procedure Act while rescinding DACA. In 2023, Olson wrote in an op-ed that the U.S. should conclude the criminal cases of the remaining Guantanamo Bay defendants. Citing the complicated nature of death penalty cases, as well as the fact that many of the convictions already secured had been partially or fully overturn by appeals courts, he publicly encouraged the government to offer sentences of life in prison.

== Personal life ==
Olson was married four times. His first marriage was to Karen Beatie whom he met in college at the University of the Pacific. They divorced in 1986. Olson's second wife was Jolie Ann Bales, an attorney and a liberal Democrat. They divorced in 1990. Olson's third wife, Barbara Kay Olson (née Bracher), an attorney and conservative commentator, was a passenger aboard the hijacked American Airlines Flight 77 that crashed into a sector of the Pentagon on his birthday, September 11, 2001. Her original plan was to fly to California on September 10, but she delayed her departure until the next morning so she could wake up with her husband on his birthday. Before she died, she called her husband to warn him about the flight. On October 21, 2006, Olson married Lady Evelyn Booth, a tax attorney from Kentucky and a lifelong Democrat. They remained married for 18 years until his death. Olson died of a stroke at a hospital in Falls Church, Virginia, on November 13, 2024, at the age of 84.

== Politics ==
Olson was a founding member of the Federalist Society. He served on the board of directors of The American Spectator magazine. Olson was a prominent critic of Bill Clinton's presidency, and he helped prepare the attorneys of Paula Jones prior to their Supreme Court appearance. Olson served on Rudy Giuliani's 2008 presidential campaign as its judicial committee chairman. In 2012 he participated in Paul Ryan's preparation for the vice presidential debate, role-playing Joe Biden. He was an outspoken advocate for gay marriage in the Republican Party.

== Executive appointment speculation ==
Prior to President Bush's nomination of D.C. Circuit Court of Appeals Judge John G. Roberts, Olson was considered a potential nominee to the Supreme Court of the United States to fill Sandra Day O'Connor's post. Following the withdrawal of Harriet Miers' nomination for that post, and prior to the nomination of Third Circuit Court of Appeals Judge Samuel Alito, Olson's name was again mentioned as a possible nominee. In September 2007, Olson was considered by the Bush administration for the post of Attorney General to succeed Alberto Gonzales. The Democrats were so vehemently opposed that Bush nominated Michael Mukasey instead.

== Controversies ==
Olson, who served as Ronald Reagan's assistant attorney general from 1981 to 1983, recommended that Reagan invoke executive privilege to prevent a Democratic Party-led investigation into the scandal-ridden Superfund program. These claims ultimately proved to be false, in large part. In the end, it was Olson's mistakes that led to the departure of Reagan's appointed Environmental Protection Agency administrator, Anne Gorsuch Burford. As a result, Reagan's plan to reform environmental policy was derailed indefinitely.

In the 1980s, Olson provided evasive answers to questions asked by the Congress about the scandal. He was then investigated by an independent counsel for allegedly providing false testimony to Congress, which some have termed as perjury, in an effort to conceal his own wrongdoing. The investigation ended with the independent counsel ruling that Olson's testimony was "misleading and disingenuous". Olson was a prominent figure in the Arkansas Project, which used the tax-exempt The American Spectator to transfer over $2 million to private investigators digging out anti-Clinton trash. He suggested that officials of the Clinton administration were involved in illegal activities and compared the White House to a Mafia family in anonymous pieces for the Spectator.

Olson challenged California tribal gaming law, namely California's Proposition 5, from 1998 on. In January 2022, Olson began representing Maverick Gaming, a Las Vegas-based, in a challenge to gaming compacts in Washington state that gave exclusivity to more than a dozen Washington tribes for sports betting. The case has been described as a threat to tribal sovereignty and may potentially result in a return to Termination Era policies of the 1950s. After participating as a defendant, the Shoalwater Bay Tribe filed a move to dismiss the case in October 2022. In February 2023, the case was dismissed by David Estudillo, the chief judge of the U.S. District Court for the Western District of Washington.

== Bibliography ==
- Olson, Theodore B. (2006). The Senate Confirmation Process: Advise and Consent, or Search and Destroy?. Washington, D.C.: National Legal Center for the Public Interest. OCLC 70790172.
- Boies, David & Olson, Theodore B. (2014). Redeeming the Dream: The Case for Marriage Equality. New York: Viking. ISBN 9780670015962.

Legal offices
Preceded by Barbara Underwood (acting)	Solicitor General of the United States; 2001–2004	Succeeded by Paul Clement
