= List of LGBTQ state supreme court justices in the United States =

Below is a list of the names of openly LGBT persons who have served on the highest court of a state or territory in the United States.

The first state with an openly LGBT justice was Oregon, where Rives Kistler was named to the bench in 2003. The first U.S. territory with an openly LGBT justice was Guam, where Benjamin Cruz was appointed in 1997. As of October 31, 2025, there are 10 openly LGBT state supreme court justices, serving in 9 states.

== In U.S. states ==
=== Current ===
Order	State	Court	Justice	Ref	Service as justice	As chief justice	Mandatory retirement
1	Colorado	Colorado Supreme Court	Monica Márquez		2010–present	2024–present	2041
2	Hawaii	Supreme Court of Hawaii	Sabrina McKenna		2011–present	–	2027
3	Connecticut	Connecticut Supreme Court	Andrew J. McDonald		2013–present	September 6, 2024–September 30, 2024	2036
4	Washington	Washington Supreme Court	Mary Yu		2014–present	–	2032
5	Nevada	Supreme Court of Nevada	Lidia S. Stiglich		2016–present	2023–2024	2024
6	New Mexico	New Mexico Supreme Court	C. Shannon Bacon		2019–present	2022–2024	2026
7	Washington	Washington Supreme Court	Helen Whitener		2020–present	–	2039
8	New York	New York State Court of Appeals	Anthony Cannataro		2021–present	2022–2023	2035
9	California	Supreme Court of California	Kelli Evans		2023–present	–	2026
10	Massachusetts	Massachusetts Supreme Judicial Court	Gabrielle Wolohojian		2024–present	–	2030

=== Former ===
Order	State	Court	Justice	Ref	Service as justice
1	Oregon	Oregon Supreme Court	Rives Kistler		2003–2018
2	Oregon	Oregon Supreme Court	Virginia Linder		2007–2016
3	Massachusetts	Massachusetts Supreme Judicial Court	Barbara Lenk		2011–2020
4	New York	New York State Court of Appeals	Paul Feinman		2017–2021
5	Vermont	Vermont Supreme Court	Beth Robinson		2011–2021
6	Oregon	Oregon Supreme Court	Lynn Nakamoto		2016–2021
7	Massachusetts	Massachusetts Supreme Judicial Court	Elspeth B. Cypher		2017–2024
8	Minnesota	Minnesota Supreme Court	Margaret Chutich		2016–2024
9	California	Supreme Court of California	Martin Jenkins		2020–2025

== In U.S. territories ==
Order	Territory	Court	Justice	Ref	Service as justice	As chief justice
1	Guam	Supreme Court of Guam	Benjamin Cruz		1997–2001	1999–2001
2	Puerto Rico	Supreme Court of Puerto Rico	Maite Oronoz Rodríguez		2014–present	2016–present

== See also ==
- State supreme courts
- List of LGBT jurists in the United States
- List of the first LGBT holders of political offices in the United States

== Other topics of interest ==
- List of African-American jurists
- List of Asian American jurists
- List of Hispanic and Latino American jurists
- List of Jewish American jurists
- List of Native American jurists
- List of first women lawyers and judges in the United States
- List of first minority male lawyers and judges in the United States
