= Hector LaSalle =

New York State judge

Presiding Justice of the New York State Supreme Court, Appellate Division, Second Department
- Incumbent
- Assumed office 2021
- Appointed by: Andrew Cuomo
- Preceded by: William F. Mastro (acting)

Personal details
- Born: Hector Daniel LaSalle; July 30, 1968 (age 58) Brentwood, New York, U.S.
- Party: Democratic
- Children: 2
- Education: Pennsylvania State University (BA); University of Michigan (JD)

Hector Daniel LaSalle (born 1967/1968) is an American lawyer and jurist who is the presiding judge of the New York Supreme Court, Appellate Division, Second Department.

In 2022, LaSalle was nominated by Governor Kathy Hochul to serve as chief judge of the New York Court of Appeals, the state's highest court. His nomination drew opposition from a wide variety of Democratic groups and constituencies, including numerous unions and trade groups, criminal justice advocates, elected officeholders, and local party affiliates, who raised concerns about his track record on issues relating to abortion, criminal justice, corporate interests, and the environment.

In January 2023, the State Senate's Judiciary Committee narrowly voted to reject LaSalle's nomination. However, Hochul threatened to sue the Senate to force a full vote on the nomination. On February 15, the full Senate overwhelmingly voted 39–20 to reject the nomination. Hochul attempted to sue but eventually acknowledged the result, and nominated Rowan D. Wilson.

== Early life and education ==
LaSalle was born in Brentwood on Long Island, New York, and graduated from Brentwood High School. He earned a Bachelor of Arts degree from Pennsylvania State University in 1990, and a Juris Doctor from the University of Michigan Law School in 1993.

== Career ==
LaSalle served as an assistant district attorney in the Suffolk County District Attorney's office from 1993 to 1998 and as deputy bureau chief of the office's Special Investigation Bureau from 2002 to 2008. He also worked as an associate at Ruskin Moscou Faltishek, P.C. and served as a deputy attorney general in the New York Attorney General's Office, Claims Bureau (Medical Malpractice Section). In 2021, New York Governor Andrew Cuomo nominated him to serve as the presiding judge of the New York Supreme Court, Appellate Division, Second Department.

=== Nomination for chief judge of the Court of Appeals ===
In 2022, the New York Commission on Judicial Nominations (CJN) chose LaSalle and six others from a collection of candidates, all of whom had applied for the job, to be placed on a list of candidates to replace Janet DiFiore as chief judge of the New York Court of Appeals. Late that December, Governor Kathy Hochul nominated LaSalle. Had he been confirmed, he would have been the state's first Latino chief judge.

LaSalle's nomination faced substantial opposition from more than a dozen Democratic members of the State Senate, labor unions, civil rights groups, the Manhattan Democratic Party, and other Democratic-aligned advocacy groups and organizations, who criticized his record on abortion, labor, and criminal justice cases. Others objected to his background as a prosecutor, arguing that the higher courts needed a defense lawyer's perspective to balance out the many former prosecutors on the bench. The nomination was also criticized because, during her recent gubernatorial campaign, Hochul had promised to appoint a strongly liberal judge to DiFiore's position in order to reverse what many saw as a conservative drift for a court with a historical reputation for bold progressive decisions, especially at a time when the U.S. Supreme Court had become more conservative.

LaSalle's defenders, primarily older Latino Democratic officeholders such as Senator Luis R. Sepúlveda, argued that he was being held to an impossibly high standard because of his ethnicity, despite that younger Latino leaders were among LaSalle's fiercest opponents. They also argued that his critics had distorted and misrepresented decisions he had joined to make him appear more conservative than he actually was. Some of the state's major unions, such as the Public Employees Federation, which represents white-collar workers in state government, and New York City's Transit Workers Union, criticized their fellow unions' opposition and called for him to receive a full Senate vote while not directly endorsing him.

Both sides accused the other of manipulating the process. LaSalle's opponents noted that three other sitting judges on the Court—Jenny Rivera, Shirley Troutman, and Rowan D. Wilson—were also reportedly among the 41 people who applied to the CJN for consideration but did not make the final list. They noted that those three had frequently dissented in some of the narrowly-decided rulings of the DiFiore Court lamented by liberals, particularly the 2022 case that invalidated a congressional redistricting map drawn by the legislature after the state's independent redistricting commission had failed to agree on one and assigned the task to a special master. Many Democrats blamed those maps for allowing Republicans enough competitive seats to retake a slight majority in the U.S. House of Representatives. Furthermore, four of the 12 members of the CJN are appointed by the Chief Judge, and three of those four were DiFiore appointees. An additional five were appointed by either former governor Andrew Cuomo, who had appointed and strongly supported DiFiore, or Republican legislative leaders. That created a nine-member bloc that could have prevented Rivera, Troutman, or Wilson from gaining the necessary seven votes to advance, while allowing the more conservative Anthony Cannataro, the only other sitting judge on the Court who applied, to advance. Opponents cited reports that DiFiore's three appointees had in fact actively worked to prevent the three liberal judges from reaching the shortlist. (Note: This was not the first time the CJN had been accused of purposely frustrating a governor's stated intent to appoint a particular category of judge. When governor Mario Cuomo, who had promised during his campaigns that he would appoint a woman as chief judge, had the opportunity during the early 1980s to appoint a new chief judge, the commission returned a list of exclusively male candidates.)

LaSalle's supporters, meanwhile, criticized Democratic leadership in the State Senate for expanding the membership of its Judiciary Committee from 15 to 19 as the legislature reconvened for its new session. The move was described as routine housekeeping, but his supporters noted that some of the Democrats newly assigned to the committee, like Jessica Ramos, had already declared their opposition to LaSalle, and called the new committee stacked.

==== Committee vote ====
The Constitution of New York required the State Senate to act on LaSalle's nomination within 30 days. On January 18, after a five-hour hearing, the Judiciary Committee voted 10–9 against advancing his nomination to the floor, the first time since New York began filling Court of Appeals vacancies through gubernatorial appointments rather than elections that lawmakers have rejected a nominee. Hochul suggested she might file suit to force a full Senate vote on LaSalle, arguing that the state constitution required it.

Judiciary Committee chair Brad Hoylman-Sigal spoke about his vote against LaSalle with New York magazine afterwards, saying that "I think he most certainly demonstrated that he is a decent individual who pursues public service for the right reasons and has a moving personal story, as well as potentially the historic role of him being the first Latino chief judge. ... But at the end of the day, I don't think he sufficiently answered my colleagues' questions about some troubling decisions." Like many progressives, Hoylman-Sigal found one of those decisions, People v. Bridgeforth (2014), particularly troubling. In Bridgeforth, LaSalle had joined a short unanimous opinion holding that a black defendant was not prejudiced by the court granting the prosecutor's peremptory challenges striking all dark-skinned jurors from the pool regardless of race, a decision ultimately reversed by the Court of Appeals on the grounds that the state Constitution specifically barred discrimination on the basis of color as well as race. LaSalle and his defenders claimed that the Appellate Division was bound by precedent, but Hoylman-Sigal noted that the opinion had not specifically identified the precedent in question, which LaSalle admitted it should have. Hoylman-Sigal also noted that LaSalle had joined 5,700 decisions as an appellate judge and personally authored only six, two of which were reversed by the Court of Appeals, and that LaSalle had left certain portions of his application for the position incomplete. Lastly, Hoylman-Sigal believed that the backlash LaSalle had provoked made him unlikely to be able to unite a fractious court whose members were openly attacking each other in opinions.

On February 15, the full State Senate voted 39–20 to reject LaSalle. All Democrats present voted against the nomination except Monica Martinez, while all Republicans except Mario Mattera were in support. Four senators, including Sepúlveda, were absent. Hochul threatened to sue the New York Senate, but eventually accepted the result and promised to nominate another candidate soon.
