= Albert Rosenblatt =

American lawyer

Albert M. Rosenblatt

Associate Judge of the New York Court of Appeals
- In office 1998–2006
- Appointed by: George Pataki

Chief Administrative Judge of the Courts
- In office 1987–1989
- Preceded by: Joseph W. Bellacosa
- Succeeded by: Matthew T. Crosson

Personal details
- Born: Albert Martin Rosenblatt; January 17, 1936 New York City, New York
- Education: University of Pennsylvania (BA); Harvard University (LLB)

Albert Martin Rosenblatt (born January 17, 1936, New York City) is a former associate judge of the New York Court of Appeals.

== Early life and education ==
Albert Martin Rosenblatt was born on January 17, 1936, at Royal Hospital in the Bronx to Isaac Rosenblatt and Fannie Dachs. He attended the University of Pennsylvania, graduating in 1957, and Harvard Law School, where he received his law degree in 1960.

== Career as District Attorney and Judge ==
Rosenblatt served two terms as District Attorney of Dutchess County, New York, from 1969 to 1975. He then served as a Dutchess County Court Judge until November 1981, when he was elected to New York Supreme Court. Rosenblatt was New York's Chief Administrative Judge from 1987 to 1989. During his two-year tenure, he created the New York State Advisory Committee on Judicial Ethics. He also established a program for improving court facilities statewide, and established a number of jury reform initiatives including the establishment of the “stand-by” and “call-in” systems to decrease the time prospective jurors spend in the courthouse. He was appointed by Governor George Pataki as an Associate Justice of the New York Supreme Court, Appellate Division, Second Department. He served on that court from 1989 to 1998.

After Governor George Pataki nominated Rosenblatt to serve on the New York Court of Appeals, the State's highest court, he was confirmed by the Senate on December 17, 1998. Rosenblatt served as an Associate Judge of the Court of Appeals until December 2006, when he reached the constitutional age limit.

== Current positions ==
Rosenblatt is currently of counsel to McCabe & Mack LLP, in Poughkeepsie, New York. He also teaches part-time at the New York University School of Law, where he holds the title of Judicial Fellow.

== Sources ==
- George Marlow, "Albert Martin Rosenblatt" in The Judges of the New York Court of Appeals: A Biographical History (Fordham University Press, 2007).
