= Paul Clement =

American lawyer (born 1966)

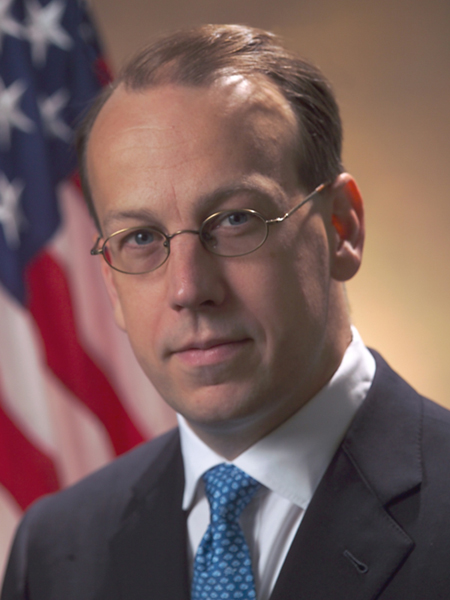
- Official portrait, 2005

Acting United States Attorney General
- In office September 17, 2007 – September 18, 2007
- President: George W. Bush
- Deputy: Craig S. Morford (acting)
- Preceded by: Alberto Gonzales
- Succeeded by: Peter Keisler (acting)

43rd United States Solicitor General
- In office July 11, 2004 – June 19, 2008; Acting: July 11, 2004 – June 13, 2005
- President: George W. Bush
- Deputy: Gregory G. Garre
- Preceded by: Ted Olson
- Succeeded by: Gregory G. Garre

United States Principal Deputy Solicitor General
- In office February 2001 – July 11, 2004
- President: George W. Bush
- Preceded by: Barbara Underwood
- Succeeded by: Gregory G. Garre

Personal details
- Born: Paul Drew Clement; June 24, 1966 (age 60) Cedarburg, Wisconsin, U.S.
- Party: Republican
- Education: Georgetown University (BS); Darwin College, Cambridge (MPhil); Harvard University (JD)

Paul Drew Clement (born June 24, 1966) is an American lawyer who served as Solicitor General of the United States from 2005 to 2008 and is known for his advocacy before the U.S. Supreme Court. He is a distinguished lecturer in law at Georgetown University and a founding partner of the law firm Clement & Murphy.

After serving as Solicitor General during the George W. Bush administration, Clement joined the Georgetown University Law Center as a visiting professor and senior fellow at the Supreme Court Institute. He was a partner at the law firms King & Spalding, Bancroft PLLC, and Kirkland & Ellis. In 2022, Clement left Kirkland & Ellis after the firm decided to stop handling Second Amendment cases and founded Clement & Murphy with fellow Kirkland partner Erin Murphy.

As of April 2026, Clement had argued 124 cases before the Supreme Court. During his career, Clement has argued cases on behalf of many conservative causes, such as opposing gun control; defending a ban on federal recognition of same-sex marriage; advocating to enjoin the Affordable Care Act; defending Republican gerrymandering in North Carolina; and, as Acting Solicitor General, defending the Controlled Substances Act under the Commerce Clause, as well as the Bush administration's treatment of terrorism suspects. Clement has also been a vocal advocate of the principle that all legal clients, even if they are unpopular, deserve representation. He has represented multiple clients challenging Trump administration actions.

== Early life and education ==
Clement was born and raised in Cedarburg, Wisconsin. He was one of four children born to Jean and Jerry Clement.

After graduation from Cedarburg High School in 1984, Clement attended Georgetown University's Walsh School of Foreign Service and in 1988 received a Bachelor of Science (B.S.) in foreign service, summa cum laude. While at Georgetown, Clement successfully competed in the American Parliamentary Debate Association as part of the university's Philodemic Society.

Clement then entered graduate study in economics at Darwin College, Cambridge, receiving a Master of Philosophy (M.Phil.) with distinction in 1989. He then attended Harvard Law School, where he became the Supreme Court editor of the Harvard Law Review. He was one of eight editors of the law review's annual lampoon who oversaw publication of a satirical piece mocking an article by Mary Joe Frug on the one-year anniversary of her murder. Clement and the other seven editors apologized for the parody after backlash from students and faculty. Clement received a Juris Doctor, magna cum laude, from Harvard in 1992.

== Legal career ==
After law school, Clement was a law clerk to U.S. circuit judge Laurence Silberman of the U.S. Court of Appeals for the District of Columbia Circuit from 1992 to 1993, then to U.S. Supreme Court Justice Antonin Scalia from 1993 to 1994.

After his clerkships, Clement entered private practice as an associate in the Washington, D.C. office of the law firm Kirkland & Ellis. Clement went on to serve as Chief Counsel of Subcommittee on the Constitution, Federalism and Property Rights of the U.S. Senate Judiciary Committee. Afterward, he was a partner in the Washington, D.C., office of King & Spalding, where he headed the firm's appellate practice.

From 1998 to 2004, he also served as an adjunct professor at the Georgetown University Law Center, where he taught a seminar on the separation of powers.

Clement joined the United States Department of Justice in February 2001. Before his confirmation as Solicitor General, he served as Principal Deputy Solicitor General, and he became the acting Solicitor General on July 11, 2004, when Theodore Olson resigned. He has argued more than 100 cases before the United States Supreme Court, including McConnell v. FEC, Tennessee v. Lane, Rumsfeld v. Padilla, United States v. Booker, Hamdi v. Rumsfeld, Rumsfeld v. FAIR, Hamdan v. Rumsfeld, Gonzales v. Raich, Gonzales v. Oregon, Gonzales v. Carhart, Hein v. Freedom From Religion Foundation, and Sekhar v. United States. He also argued many of the key cases in the lower courts involving challenges to the Bush administration's conduct of the war on terrorism. As of November 2011 he had argued more cases before the Supreme Court since 2000 than any other attorney.

On August 27, 2007, President Bush named Clement as the future acting Attorney General of the United States, to take office upon the resignation of Alberto Gonzales, effective September 17, 2007. According to administration officials, Clement took that office at 12:01 am September 17, 2007, and left office 24 hours later. On September 17, President Bush announced that Assistant Attorney General for the Civil Division, Peter Keisler would become acting Attorney General, pending a permanent appointment of a presidential nominee.

Clement gave notice of his resignation on May 14, 2008, effective June 2, 2008, and returned to Georgetown University Law Center as a senior fellow. He had been mentioned as a possible Supreme Court nominee in a John McCain presidency, and was a coveted potential hire among D.C. legal firms, who reportedly vied to build a firm around his expertise in appellate matters. Evan Tager of Mayer Brown said: "Paul Clement is the Holy Grail of law firm recruiting... The buzz in the legal world about Clement is like the buzz in basketball when LeBron James was coming out of high school and turning pro. It will be interesting to see where the market will go."

As of November 20, 2008, Clement re-joined King & Spalding as a partner in its expanding appellate litigation practice. As part of King & Spalding, he argued on behalf of the NRA in the Supreme Court case McDonald v. Chicago on March 2, 2010.

Clement was part of the legal team that represented NBA players in labor negotiations during the 2011 lockout. Clement also advised ten NFL players in the spring of 2011 when the NFL was facing a potential lock-out.

As a partner at King & Spalding, Clement was hired in April 2011 by the Republican majority in the U.S. House of Representatives to defend the Defense of Marriage Act, a law that defined marriage as between one man and one woman, after the U.S. Department of Justice chose to stop defending it. King & Spalding withdrew from the case on April 25, 2011, and Clement resigned from the firm to continue his representation, arguing that "representation should not be abandoned because the client's legal position is extremely unpopular in certain quarters."

Clement joined Bancroft PLLC, a boutique law firm led by former Assistant Attorney General Viet D. Dinh.

On March 27, 2013, Clement served for the respondent Bipartisan Legal Advisory Group (BLAG) of the United States House of Representatives at the Supreme Court in United States v. Windsor. On June 26, 2013, the Court ruled against Clement and BLAG by finding the Defense of Marriage Act to be unconstitutional.

Clement led the challenge on behalf of 26 states to overturn the Patient Protection and Affordable Care Act in the Supreme Court on March 26–28, 2012. The Court upheld the "individual mandate" as a tax, but found the States could not be compelled to follow the portion of the law relating to Medicaid expansion.

Clement was mentioned as a potential Supreme Court nominee of Republican presidential nominees John McCain and Mitt Romney. In 2014, Jeffrey Toobin named Clement a likely Supreme Court nominee in the event of a Republican victory in the 2016 presidential election.

In 2019, Clement was an attorney for the appellants in the landmark Rucho v. Common Cause Supreme Court case, in which partisan gerrymandering was declared a non-justiciable issue.

In September 2020, Clement appeared on President Donald Trump's list of potential Supreme Court candidates.

In June 2022, following his clients' Supreme Court victory in New York State Rifle & Pistol Association, Inc. v. Bruen, Clement separated from Kirkland & Ellis, after the firm announced it would "no longer handle Second Amendment litigation". Subsequently, Clement opened a boutique law firm, Clement & Murphy PLLC, with Erin Murphy, another former partner at Kirkland & Ellis.

In February 2025, Clement was appointed by Judge Dale Ho to present outside arguments against the Justice Department's request to drop the corruption case against Eric Adams, Mayor of New York City. In March 2025, Clement recommended the case be dismissed with prejudice.

In March 2025, Clement began representation of big law firm WilmerHale, LLP in its case challenging President Trump's March 27, 2025 Executive Order targeting the law firm.

In April 2025, Clement joined the defense team representing Milwaukee Circuit Judge Hannah Dugan, who was arrested on April 25 for allegedly interfering with an ICE arrest and deportation operation.

== Cases before the Supreme Court ==
Clement has argued over 100 times before the U.S. Supreme Court, making him one of the lawyers who has appeared most frequently before it during the twenty-first century. The cases he has argued include:

- McConnell v. FEC (2003)
- Tennessee v. Lane (2004)
- Rumsfeld v. Padilla (2004)
- United States v. Booker (2005)
- Hamdi v. Rumsfeld (2004)
- Rumsfeld v. FAIR (2006)
- Hamdan v. Rumsfeld (2005)
- Gonzales v. Raich (2005)
- Gonzales v. Oregon (2006)
- Gonzales v. Carhart (2007)
- Hein v. Freedom From Religion Foundation (2007)
- NFIB v. Sebelius (2012)
- Adoptive Couple v. Baby Girl (2013)
- U.S. v. Windsor (2013)
- Sekhar v. United States (2013)
- Burwell v. Hobby Lobby Stores (2014)
- Zubik v. Burwell (2016)
- Cooper v. Harris (2017)
- Epic Systems Corp. v. Lewis (2018)
- Rucho v. Common Cause (2019)
- Seila Law LLC v. Consumer Financial Protection Bureau (2020)
- Little Sisters of the Poor Saints Peter and Paul Home v. Pennsylvania (2020)
- New York State Rifle & Pistol Association, Inc. v. Bruen (2022)
- Kennedy v. Bremerton School District (2022)
- Amgen Inc. v. Sanofi (2023)
- Loper Bright Enterprises v. Raimondo (2024)
- Seven County Infrastructure Coalition v. Eagle County (2024)
- Cox Communications v. Sony Music Entertainment (2025)
- Trump v. Cook (2026)
- Havana Docks Corp. v. Royal Caribbean Cruises (2026)
- Watson v. Republican National Committee (2026)
- Monsanto Co. v. Durnell (2026)

== See also ==
- List of law clerks for the ninth seat of the Supreme Court of the United States
- George W. Bush Supreme Court candidates
- Donald Trump Supreme Court candidates

Legal offices
Preceded by Barbara Underwood	United States Principal Deputy Solicitor General; 2001–2004	Succeeded by Daryl Joseffer
Preceded by Ted Olson	United States Solicitor General; 2004–2008; Acting: 2004–2005	Succeeded by Gregory Garre
Preceded by Alberto Gonzales	United States Attorney General; Acting; 2007	Succeeded by Peter Keisler; Acting
