= Preeta D. Bansal =

American lawyer (born 1965)

Preeta Bansal

Solicitor General of New York
- In office 1999–2001
- Preceded by: Barbara Gott Billet
- Succeeded by: Caitlin Halligan

Personal details
- Born: October 18, 1965 (age 60) Lincoln, Nebraska, U.S.
- Party: Democratic
- Education: Harvard University (BA, JD)

Preeta D. Bansal (born October 18, 1965) is an American lawyer who served as the general counsel and senior policy advisor to the federal Office of Management and Budget from 2009 until 2011. Prior to her work in the Obama administration, she served as a law partner at Skadden, Arps, Slate, Meagher & Flom and as the Solicitor General of New York during Attorney General Eliot Spitzer's first term. She also has been a member and past chair of the United States Commission on International Religious Freedom (USCIRF). She is currently a lecturer at MIT and senior advisor at the Laboratory for Social Machines based at the MIT Media Lab.

== Early life and education ==
Bansal is of Indian origin, her parents having emigrated from India in the 1960s. She was raised in Lincoln, Nebraska. She received an A.B. magna cum laude from Harvard University in 1986 and a J.D. magna cum laude from Harvard Law School in 1989. She served as Supervising Editor of the Harvard Law Review. After graduating from Harvard Law School, she clerked for Chief Judge James L. Oakes of the U.S. Court of Appeals for the Second Circuit from 1989 to 1990 and for United States Supreme Court Justice John Paul Stevens from 1990 to 1991.

== Career ==
Following private practice in Washington, D.C., Bansal worked in the Clinton Administration from 1993 to 1996 as a Counselor in the U.S. Department of Justice and as a White House Special Counsel. At the Justice Department, she assisted Joel Klein, Assistant Attorney General for the Antitrust Division, on United States v. Microsoft and other matters.

In 1999, newly elected New York State Attorney General Eliot Spitzer recruited her to serve in his office as Solicitor General of the State of New York, the statutory ranking officer after the Attorney General. In that capacity, she was in charge of the office's appellate activities, supervising 45 lawyers in the Solicitor General's Office who filed 40 to 50 appellate briefs each week, and she also helped manage the significant legal positions and amicus strategy of the 600 lawyers in the Attorney General's Office. Bansal won the "Best United States Supreme Court Brief" award from the National Association of Attorneys General during every year that she served as New York Solicitor General, and is widely credited with initiating significant managerial reforms to enhance the legal excellence, efficiency and transparency of the Solicitor General's Office and with providing the intellectual underpinning of "federalism" that later animated Attorney General Spitzer's active state enforcement agenda.

Bansal returned to Nebraska and taught Constitutional Law, Federalism, and a seminar on "Courts, Politics and Legal/Social Change: Evaluating the Limits and Successes of Rights-Based Approaches" as a visiting professor at the University of Nebraska College of Law from 2002-2003. She was a visiting fellow at Harvard's John F. Kennedy School of Government in 2003.

Senate Minority Leader Tom Daschle chose Bansal for the bipartisan United States Commission on International Religious Freedom (USCIRF) in 2003, at which time she also rejoined private law practice in New York at Skadden, Arps. As a partner at Skadden, Arps, Slate, Meagher & Flom, Bansal led the firm's appellate litigation and complex legal issues practice. In a "Public Lives" profile of her in 1999, the New York Times referred to her as a "legal superstar." She has appeared as a commentator on legal issues and U.S. Supreme Court matters on CNN, C-SPAN and PBS news programs. She was mentioned as a possible Solicitor General in the Barack Obama Administration before Harvard Law School Dean Elena Kagan was announced as Obama's selection for the post.

On January 19, 2009, the Obama transition announced that Bansal had been chosen to serve at the Office of Management and Budget as General Counsel and Senior Policy Adviser.

In 2011, The National Law Journal reported that Bansal would be stepping down as general counsel of OMB. Following her departure from government, President Obama appointed her as a public, nongovernmental member of the governing Council of the Administrative Conference of the United States, a public-private partnership designed to make government work better.

Bansal is a Henry Crown Fellow at the Aspen Institute and a Member of the Council on Foreign Relations. She received the National Organization of Women's "Woman of Power and Influence Award" in 2006 and was named one of the "50 Most Influential Minority Lawyers in America" by the National Law Journal in its inaugural list in 2008. In 2006, she was a co-chair for then-Attorney General-Elect Andrew Cuomo's transition team, and previously served as a board member of the Clinton Global Initiative, the National Women's Law Center and the New York City Bar Justice Center, and as a Commissioner on Mayor Bloomberg's Election Modernization Task Force.

== See also ==
- List of law clerks for the fourth seat of the Supreme Court of the United States
