= Anthony Cannataro =

American judge (born 1965)

Tony Cannataro
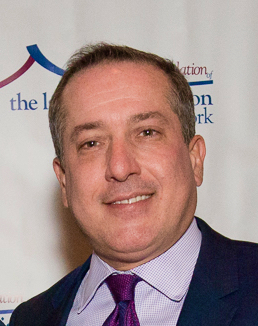

Chief Judge of the New York Court of Appeals
- Acting
- In office September 1, 2022 – April 18, 2023
- Preceded by: Janet DiFiore
- Succeeded by: Rowan D. Wilson

Associate Judge of the New York Court of Appeals
- Incumbent
- Assumed office June 8, 2021
- Appointed by: Andrew Cuomo
- Preceded by: Paul Feinman

Personal details
- Born: July 1965 (age 61) New Jersey, U.S.
- Party: Democratic
- Education: Columbia University (BA); New York Law School (JD)

Anthony Cannataro (born July 1965) is an associate judge of the New York Court of Appeals, serving since September 1, 2022. He has served as an associate judge of the same court since his 2021 appointment by then-Governor Andrew Cuomo. Cannataro previously served as the chief administrative judge of the New York City Civil Court from 2018 to 2021 and as a judge on various New York City courts from 2012 to 2021.

== Early life and education ==
Cannataro was born in July 1965 in New Jersey. He earned a Bachelor of Arts in the Classics from Columbia University in 1993 and a Juris Doctor from New York Law School in June 1996.

== Career ==
Cannataro was the principal law clerk to Judge Carmen Beauchamp Ciparick of the New York Court of Appeals from 2000 to 2003 and principal law clerk to Judge Lottie E. Wilkins of the New York Supreme Court from 2003 to 2011. From 2012 to 2017 he was elected to serve as a judge of the New York City Civil Court. From 2012 to 2014 he was designated a judge of the New York Family Court for Kings County, New York. From 2014 to 2015 he was a judge of the New York City Civil Court for The Bronx. From 2015 to 2016 he was designated an acting Supreme Court Justice for the New York Supreme Court. From 2016 to 2018, he was appointed a supervising judge for the New York City Civil Court. In 2017 he was elected to the New York Supreme Court to serve in the civil term. From 2018 to 2021, he served as an administrative judge of the New York City Civil Court after being appointed by chief administrative judge Lawrence K. Marks.

=== New York Court of Appeals service ===
Cannataro was one of seven candidates submitted to the governor in April 2021. On May 25, 2021, Governor Andrew Cuomo announced Cannataro as a nominee to be an Associate Judge of the New York Court of Appeals, filling the seat vacated by the retirement of Judge Paul Feinman on March 23, 2021. He was confirmed on June 8, 2021, and took office the same day. His formal investiture ceremony took place on April 5, 2022. Cannataro is the second openly gay judge to have served on the New York Court of Appeals. On March 24, 2023, Cannataro was selected as a finalist under consideration for appointment to the New York Court of Appeals, this time for the position of chief judge following the retirement of Chief Judge Janet DiFiore and the subsequent rejection of Justice Hector LaSalle's nomination to that seat by the New York State Senate.

== Personal life ==
Cannataro was born to parents who emigrated from Italy. He and his husband live in Washington Heights, Manhattan.

== See also ==
- List of LGBT state supreme court justices in the United States
- List of LGBT jurists in the United States

Legal offices
Preceded by Paul Feinman	Associate Judge of the New York Court of Appeals; 2021–present	Incumbent
Preceded by Janet DiFiore	Chief Judge of the New York Court of Appeals; Acting; 2022–2023	Succeeded by Rowan D. Wilson
