= Bancroft PLLC =

American law firm

- Headquarters: Washington, D.C.
- No. of offices: 1
- No. of attorneys: 17
- Major practice areas: Supreme Court and appellate litigation, national security law, corporate governance, risk management
- Website: www.bancroftpllc.com

Bancroft PLLC (formerly Bancroft Associates PLLC) was an American law firm headquartered in Washington, D.C. The firm was founded in Washington, D.C. by former Assistant Attorney General Viet D. Dinh. Bancroft specialized in Supreme Court and appellate litigation, government investigations, national security law, and corporate governance.

Bancroft worked in a number of substantive areas, including antitrust, arbitration, class actions, commercial, copyright, criminal, education, employment, energy, environmental, ERISA, FDA, health care, insurance, labor, national security, patent, preemption, RICO, securities, telecommunications, and all manner of constitutional issues.

The firm effectively stopped operating in 2016 when its lawyers all joined the law firm Kirkland & Ellis.

== History ==
Bancroft PLLC was founded in 2003 as a legal and policy strategy firm by Viet Dinh. Dinh is perhaps best known for his involvement in designing the USA PATRIOT Act while serving as an Assistant Attorney General in the administration of George W. Bush. The firm's name reflects the address of the Dupont Circle townhouse that served as its first location.

In April 2011, former Solicitor General Paul Clement joined the firm as a partner after resigning from King & Spalding, after that firm dropped the case of defending the Defense of Marriage Act. In September 2016, Kirkland & Ellis hired all of the attorneys at the firm.

== Notable cases ==
- Represented the Guardian ad Litem—who participated as a party to the proceedings on behalf of Baby Girl—in Adoptive Couple v. Baby Girl The Supreme Court ruled in favor of Bancroft, and the girl was returned to her adoptive parents.
- Represented 26 states in their Supreme Court challenge to the Patient Protection and Affordable Care Act. While the individual mandate was upheld, the Court ruled with Bancroft by holding the Medicaid expansion in the law unconstitutional, concluding that the federal government may not require states to expand their programs as a condition of continued participation in Medicaid.
- Secured a decision in Brown v. Plata from the Supreme Court ruling that California violated the Eighth Amendment's ban on cruel and unusual punishment. This ruling will help alleviate the considerable overcrowding of California prisons that has led to failures in the delivery of medical and mental health care.
- Represented the NFL in a number of cases, including a 2011 labor dispute with players.
- Defended the Defense of Marriage Act, which defined marriage in federal law as the union between one man and one woman.
