= List of chief judges of the New York Court of Appeals =

The Chief Judge of the New York Court of Appeals, ex officio the Chief Judge of New York, supervises the seven-judge New York Court of Appeals. In addition, the chief judge oversees the work of the state's Unified Court system, which as of 2009, had a $2.5 billion annual budget and more than 16,000 employees. The chief judge is also chair of the Administrative Board of the Courts and a member of the Judicial Conference of the State of New York. The chief judge appoints the Chief Administrator of the Courts with the advice and consent of the board.

== Chief judges between 1847 and 1870 ==
Until 1847 the most senior judge in the state was the Chancellor of New York. That position was abolished in 1847 when the court system was re-organized, and the Chief Judge succeeded the Chancellor as the head of the state's judicial system.

Name	Took office	Left office	Party	Notes
Freeborn G. Jewett	July 5, 1847	December 31, 1849	Democratic	
Greene C. Bronson	January 1, 1850	April 1851	Democratic/Anti-Rent	Resigned
Charles H. Ruggles	April 1851	December 31, 1853	Democratic	
Addison Gardiner	January 1, 1854	December 31, 1855	Democratic/Anti-Rent	
Hiram Denio	January 1, 1856	December 31, 1857	Democratic	
Alexander S. Johnson	January 1, 1858	December 31, 1859	Democratic	
George F. Comstock	January 1, 1860	December 31, 1861	American	Elected an associate judge on the American Party ticket, by the time his term as Chief Judge began this party had disbanded, and Comstock had become a Democrat.
Samuel L. Selden	January 1, 1862	July 1, 1862	Democratic	Resigned
Hiram Denio	July 1, 1862	December 31, 1865	Democratic	
Henry E. Davies	January 1, 1866	December 31, 1867	Republican/American	
William B. Wright	January 1, 1868	January 12, 1868	Union	Elected in 1861 on the Union ticket nominated by War Democrats and Republicans; died in office
Ward Hunt	January 12, 1868	December 31, 1869	Republican	Subsequently served as an Associate Justice of the United States Supreme Court
Robert Earl	January 1, 1870	July 4, 1870	Democratic	Legislated out of office by constitutional amendment of 1869

== Chief judges between 1870 and 1974 ==
An amendment to the New York Constitution, adopted in November 1869, re-organized the Court of Appeals. The first judges were to be elected at a special statewide election to take office on July 4, 1870.

Name	Took office	Left office	Party	Notes
Sanford E. Church	July 4, 1870	May 13, 1880	Democratic	Died in office
Charles J. Folger	May 20, 1880	November 14, 1881	Republican	Appointed to fill vacancy, then elected, then resigned to become U.S. Secretary of the Treasury
Charles Andrews	December 19, 1881	December 31, 1882	Republican	Appointed to fill vacancy
William C. Ruger	January 1, 1883	January 14, 1892	Democratic	Died in office
Robert Earl	January 19, 1892	December 31, 1892	Dem./Rep.	Appointed to fill vacancy
Charles Andrews	January 1, 1893	December 31, 1897	Rep./Dem.	Age-limited
Alton B. Parker	January 1, 1898	August 5, 1904	Democratic	Resigned to run on the Democratic ticket for U.S. President
Edgar M. Cullen	September 2, 1904	December 31, 1913	Dem./Rep.	Appointed to fill vacancy, then elected, then age-limited
Willard Bartlett	January 1, 1914	December 31, 1916	Democratic	Age-limited
Frank H. Hiscock	January 1, 1917	December 31, 1926	Rep./Progr.	Age-limited
Benjamin N. Cardozo	January 1, 1927	March 7, 1932	Dem./Rep.	Resigned to become an Associate Justice of the United States Supreme Court
Cuthbert W. Pound	March 8, 1932	December 31, 1934	Rep./Dem.	Appointed to fill vacancy, then elected, then age-limited
Frederick E. Crane	January 1, 1935	December 31, 1939	Rep./Dem.	Age-limited
Irving Lehman	January 1, 1940	September 22, 1945	Dem./Rep./Am. Labor	Died in office
John T. Loughran	September 28, 1945	March 31, 1953	Dem./Rep./Am. Labor/Lib.	Appointed to fill vacancy, then elected, then died in office
Edmund H. Lewis	April 22, 1953	December 31, 1954	Rep./Dem./Lib.	Appointed to fill vacancy, then elected, then age-limited
Albert Conway	January 1, 1955	December 31, 1959	Dem./Rep.	Age-limited
Charles S. Desmond	January 1, 1960	December 31, 1966	Dem./Rep.	Age-limited
Stanley H. Fuld	January 1, 1967	December 31, 1973	Rep./Dem.	Age-limited
Charles D. Breitel	January 1, 1974	December 31, 1978	Rep./Lib.	Last elected Chief Judge; age-limited

== Chief judges since 1974 ==
After 1974, judges of the New York Court of Appeals were no longer elected, following reforms to the New York Constitution. Instead, an appointment process was created.

Name	Took office	Left office	Appointed by	Notes
Lawrence H. Cooke	January 23, 1979	December 31, 1984	Hugh Carey	First Chief Judge appointed by the Governor under constitutional amendment of 1977; age-limited
Sol Wachtler	January 2, 1985	November 11, 1992	Mario Cuomo	Resigned
Richard D. Simons (acting)	November 17, 1992	March 22, 1993	n/a	Acted until the appointment of a successor
Judith S. Kaye	March 23, 1993	December 31, 2008	Mario Cuomo	Reached mandatory retirement age; Chief Judge with the longest tenure (more than 15 years), only Chief Judge to complete a 14-year term
Carmen Beauchamp Ciparick (acting)	January 1, 2009	February 10, 2009	n/a	Acted until the appointment of a successor
Jonathan Lippman	February 11, 2009	December 31, 2015	David Paterson	
Eugene F. Pigott Jr. (acting)	January 1, 2016	January 21, 2016	n/a	
Janet DiFiore	January 21, 2016	August 31, 2022	Andrew Cuomo	
Anthony Cannataro (acting)	September 1, 2022	April 18, 2023	n/a	Acted until the appointment of a successor
Rowan D. Wilson	April 19, 2023	incumbent	Kathy Hochul	

== See also ==
- List of associate judges of the New York Court of Appeals
