= Barbara Underwood =

American lawyer (born 1944)

Solicitor General of New York
- Incumbent
- Assumed office January 1, 2007
- Governor: Eliot Spitzer; David Paterson; Andrew Cuomo; Kathy Hochul
- Preceded by: Caitlin Halligan

66th Attorney General of New York
- In office May 8, 2018 – December 31, 2018; Acting: May 8, 2018 – May 22, 2018
- Governor: Andrew Cuomo
- Preceded by: Eric Schneiderman
- Succeeded by: Letitia James

Solicitor General of the United States
- Acting; January 20, 2001 – June 11, 2001
- President: George W. Bush
- Preceded by: Seth P. Waxman
- Succeeded by: Theodore Olson

Principal Deputy Solicitor General of the United States
- In office March 23, 1998 – June 11, 2001
- President: Bill Clinton; George W. Bush
- Preceded by: Seth P. Waxman
- Succeeded by: Paul Clement

Personal details
- Born: August 16, 1944 (age 82) Evansville, Indiana, U.S.
- Party: Democratic
- Spouse: Martin Halpern (m. 1985)
- Education: Radcliffe College (BA); Georgetown University (JD)

Barbara Dale Underwood (born August 16, 1944) is an American lawyer serving as the solicitor general of New York. She was first appointed to the position in January 2007 by Andrew Cuomo, who was then serving as the state's attorney general. Underwood was reappointed in 2011 by Attorney General Eric Schneiderman.

Underwood herself served briefly as the attorney general of New York upon Schneiderman's resignation from the position on May 8, 2018. She declined to seek the office in the 2018 New York state elections, and resumed the position of Solicitor General after Letitia James was sworn in to succeed her on January 1, 2019. Underwood was the first woman to serve as Attorney General of New York.

== Early life and education ==
Underwood was born in Evansville, Indiana, to Dr. Robert Underwood and Mildred Kinstein Underwood. She grew up in Belleville, New Jersey, and is the eldest of three daughters. Underwood earned a Bachelor of Arts magna cum laude from Radcliffe College in 1966 and received a Juris Doctor from Georgetown University Law Center in 1969.

While Underwood was a student at Radcliffe in 1963, she worked at WJRZ as news editor and got engaged to Howard Allen Cohen, a second year student at Rutgers Law School, who was also working at WJRZ.

== Legal career ==
After graduation, Underwood clerked for Chief Judge David L. Bazelon of the U.S. Court of Appeals for the District of Columbia Circuit and then Associate Justice Thurgood Marshall of the Supreme Court from 1971 to 1972. After leaving the Court, Underwood was a law professor for 10 years at the Yale Law School, from 1972 to 1982. She also has taught at Brooklyn Law School and at New York University School of Law.

Underwood left academia to work in the Kings County District Attorney's Office. She later served in the District Attorneys for three different counties in New York City: she was an Assistant District Attorney in New York County, Chief of Appeals and Counsel to the District Attorney in Kings County (Brooklyn), and Senior Executive Assistant District Attorney for Legal Affairs in Queens County. She then served as Chief Assistant United States Attorney and later Counsel to the United States Attorney for the Eastern District of New York.

In 1998, Underwood was appointed by United States Attorney General Janet Reno to be Principal Deputy Solicitor General under Solicitor General Seth P. Waxman. Underwood held that position for three years, and then served as Acting Solicitor General from January to June 2001, making her the first woman to act as Solicitor General. After working in the U.S. Attorney's Office in New York for several years, in 2007 she was appointed Solicitor General of the State of New York, a position she held under three state Attorneys General. She has argued twenty-two cases before the U.S. Supreme Court, and many cases before the federal and state appellate courts.

She became Acting Attorney General of New York on May 8, 2018, following the resignation of Eric Schneiderman. The State Legislature picked Underwood as the replacement to fill the remainder of Schneiderman's term on May 22, 2018. Underwood pledged not to seek elected office and fill out the remainder of Schneiderman's term until an elected successor is sworn in. As Attorney General, Underwood successfully sued Donald Trump and his foundation, Donald J. Trump Foundation, for "a pattern of persistent illegal conduct."

The Attorney General's office passed to Letitia James following her victory in the 2018 New York state elections. Underwood, who had never sought or held elective office, professed contentment when she returned to the Solicitor General's office in January 2019. "I like that role, and so I'm happy to go back to doing it," she told an AP interviewer at the time. "I have come to like this too. It's not that I'm eager to leave this, but I'm very happy to be going on to something that I know I like." Underwood left the office having made history as the first woman to serve as Attorney General of New York.

On November 30, 2020, as Solicitor General of New York, Underwood argued the case Trump v. New York on behalf of New York State.

On November 3, 2021, as Solicitor General of New York, Underwood unsuccessfully argued the case New York State Rifle & Pistol Association, Inc. v. Bruen on behalf of respondents.

== Honors and awards ==
In 2012, the American Inns of Court presented her with its Professionalism Award for the Second Circuit, honoring her mentorship of attorneys throughout her career. In May 2016, Radcliffe College conferred on her an honorary membership in Phi Beta Kappa.

== Family ==
Underwood has lived in New York City since 1982. She was married to Martin Halpern, a former Brandeis University professor of playwriting and dramatic literature, who died on September 10, 2023. Underwood lives in Brooklyn and has one son, Robert, born in 1986. Underwood had one previous marriage which ended in divorce. Underwood is Jewish.

== Selected publications ==
- Underwood, Barbara D. (1977). "Comment: The Thumb on the Scales of Justice: Burdens of Persuasion in Criminal Cases". Yale Law Journal. 86: 1299. doi:10.2307/795788. JSTOR 795788.
- Underwood, Barbara D. (1979). "Law and the Crystal Ball: Predicting Behavior with Statistical Inference and Individualized Judgment". Yale Law Journal. 88 (7): 1408–1448. doi:10.2307/795726. JSTOR 795726.
- Underwood, Barbara D. (1981). "Against Dichotomy". Yale Law Journal. 90 (5): 1004–1006. doi:10.2307/795936. JSTOR 795936.

== See also ==
- List of Jewish American jurists
- List of law clerks for the tenth seat of the Supreme Court of the United States

Legal offices
| Preceded by Seth P. Waxman | Solicitor General of the United States; Acting; 2001 | Succeeded by Theodore Olson |
| Preceded by Caitlin Halligan | Solicitor General of New York; 2007–present | Incumbent |
| Preceded by Eric Schneiderman | Attorney General of New York; 2018 | Succeeded by Letitia James |
