= Eugene F. Pigott Jr. =

American judge (born 1946)

Eugene Pigott

Chief Judge of the New York Court of Appeals
- Acting
- In office January 1, 2016 – February 8, 2016
- Appointed by: Andrew Cuomo
- Preceded by: Jonathan Lippman
- Succeeded by: Janet DiFiore

Associate Judge of the New York Court of Appeals
- In office September 15, 2006 – December 31, 2016
- Appointed by: George Pataki
- Preceded by: George Bundy Smith
- Succeeded by: Rowan D. Wilson

Presiding Justice of the Fourth Judicial Department
- In office 2000–2006
- Appointed by: George Pataki
- Preceded by: Delores Denman
- Succeeded by: Henry Scudder

Personal details
- Born: September 1946 (age 79) Rochester, New York, U.S.
- Education: LeMoyne-Owen College (BA); University at Buffalo (JD)

Eugene F. Pigott Jr. (born September 1946) is an American jurist who served as an Associate Judge of the New York Court of Appeals from 2006 until 2016. He was appointed by Republican Governor George Pataki, and his term expired when he reached the mandatory retirement age of 70.

== Early life and education ==
Pigott grew up in Rush, New York, a suburb of Rochester, and graduated from McQuaid Jesuit High School. He graduated with a B.A. from LeMoyne College in 1968. Judge Pigott served on active duty in the United States Army from 1968 to 1970. He was stationed in the Republic of Vietnam, serving as a Vietnamese interpreter. He graduated with a J.D. from SUNY at Buffalo School of Law in 1973.

== Legal experience ==
Judge Pigott was in private practice from 1974 to 1982 at the small but elite Buffalo firm of Offermann, Fallon, Mahoney & Adner. In 1982 he was appointed Erie County Attorney and served in that position until 1986. In 1986 he returned to private practice as chief trial counsel at his former firm, now renamed Offermann, Cassano, Pigott & Greco.

On February 4, 1997, he was appointed to the New York State Supreme Court by Governor George E. Pataki and thereafter was elected to a full 14-year term.

In 1998, Governor Pataki appointed Pigott to the Appellate Division for the Fourth Judicial Department. He served as Presiding Justice from February 16, 2000, until his appointment to the Court of Appeals.

His selection for a 14-year term to New York State's Court of Appeals, also by Governor Pataki, was confirmed by the New York State Senate in 2006. In his first years on the court, Pigott dissented relatively frequently. Compared to his colleagues he was slightly more likely to favor plaintiffs in civil cases and the prosecution in criminal cases. Pigott became known for repealing the Sugary drinks portion cap rule in New York City, arguing the New York City Board of Health exceeded its powers. He retired from the Court of Appeals effective December 31, 2016, the end of the year in which he reached age 70, as required by the New York State Constitution.

== Personal life ==
He and his wife Peggy live in Grand Island, New York. They have two children, David and Martha.

Legal offices
Preceded by M. Delores Denman	Presiding Justice of Fourth Judicial Department; 2000-2006	Succeeded by Henry J. Scudder
Preceded by George Bundy Smith	Associate Judge of the New York Court of Appeals; 2006–2016	Succeeded by Rowan D. Wilson
