= George Bundy Smith =

American judge

Associate Judge of the New York Court of Appeals
- In office September 25, 1992 – September 23, 2006
- Appointed by: Mario Cuomo
- Preceded by: Fritz W. Alexander II
- Succeeded by: Eugene F. Pigott Jr.

Personal details
- Born: George Bundy Smith; April 7, 1937 New Orleans, Louisiana
- Died: August 5, 2017 (aged 80) New York, New York
- Education: Yale College; Yale Law School; New York University

George Bundy Smith (April 7, 1937 – August 5, 2017) was a lawyer and judge in New York State. While he was a law student at Yale University, he participated in the Freedom Ride from Atlanta, Georgia, to Montgomery, Alabama.

== Early life ==
Smith was born in New Orleans in 1937. He grew up in Washington, D.C., and attended Phillips Academy, where he was the only African-American in the Class of 1955. He received an A.B. degree from Yale University in 1959 and an LL.B. from Yale Law School in 1962. In addition, he earned his doctorate from NYU in Political Science. In 1961, William Sloane Coffin invited second-year law student Smith to go to Montgomery, Alabama, as a Freedom Rider. He and ten other Freedom Riders were arrested in the Montgomery bus station in May 1961 and convicted of breach of the peace; their convictions were later reversed by the United States Supreme Court.

== Career ==
Smith began his legal career as an attorney for the NAACP Legal Defense Fund, working on cases including James Meredith's successful litigation seeking admission to the University of Mississippi. He then spent a decade as law secretary to New York State Supreme Court Justices Jawn A. Sandifer, Edward R. Dudley, and Harold A. Stevens. In 1974, he served as administrator of the Model Cities program in New York.

Smith was a judge of the New York City Civil Court from 1975 to 1979 and a justice of the New York State Supreme Court from 1980 to 1986. In 1986, Governor Mario Cuomo appointed Smith to the Appellate Division, First Department, where he served from 1986 to 1992.

In September 1992, Cuomo appointed Smith to a 14-year term as an Associate Judge of New York's highest court, the Court of Appeals in September 1992. Smith's best-known opinion for the Court was People v. LaValle, a 4-to-3 decision holding that New York's death penalty statute was unconstitutional due to the structure of its sentencing procedures.

In 2006, Governor George Pataki was urged to reappoint Smith to another term on the Court of Appeals, although Smith would have served only another 16 months on the Court before mandatory retirement at age 70. Pataki declined to reappoint Smith and instead nominated Justice Eugene F. Pigott Jr. to the seat.

After leaving the bench, Smith became a partner at the New York City law firm of Chadbourne & Parke and also worked as a mediator at JAMS. He was also an adjunct professor of law at Fordham Law School for many years both during and after his judicial service.

In December 2005, Smith was awarded the William Nelson Cromwell Award by the New York County Lawyers Association. Smith served several terms on the Board of Trustees of the Horace Mann School in Manhattan.

Smith's twin sister, Inez Smith Reid, served as a judge of the District of Columbia Court of Appeals, the District's equivalent of a state supreme court.
