= Sheila Abdus-Salaam =

American judge and lawyer (1952-2017)

- Abdus-Salaam speaking at Barnard College

Associate Judge of the New York Court of Appeals
- In office May 6, 2013 – April 12, 2017
- Appointed by: Andrew Cuomo
- Preceded by: Theodore Jones
- Succeeded by: Paul G. Feinman

Personal details
- Born: Sheila Turner; March 14, 1952 Washington, D.C., U.S.
- Died: April 12, 2017 (aged 65) New York City, U.S.
- Education: Barnard College (BA); Columbia University (JD)

Sheila Abdus-Salaam (née Turner; March 14, 1952 – April 12, 2017) was an American lawyer and judge. In 2013, after having served on the New York City Civil Court, the New York Supreme Court, and the Appellate Division, Abdus-Salaam was nominated to the New York Court of Appeals (New York's highest court) and was unanimously confirmed as an Associate Judge by the New York State Senate. She was the first African-American female judge to serve on the New York Court of Appeals.

== Early life and education ==
Sheila Turner was born on March 14, 1952, in Washington, D.C., where she grew up in a working-class family with six siblings. She attended public schools there, graduating from Eastern High School in 1970. While researching her family history as a child, she learned that her great-grandfather was a slave in Virginia.

Turner obtained a bachelor's degree from Barnard College in 1974 and graduated from Columbia Law School in 1977. Among her classmates at Columbia was Eric Holder, the future United States Attorney General.

== Career ==
Turner took her first husband's surname, Abdus-Salaam, and retained it during her professional career.

Before becoming a judge, Abdus-Salaam worked as a staff attorney for Brooklyn Legal Services and served in the New York State Department of Law as an assistant attorney general in the civil rights and real estate financing bureaus. She subsequently served on the New York City Civil Court from 1992 to 1993. Abdus-Salaam was elected a justice of the New York Supreme Court in 1993 and served in that capacity from 1993 to 2009. In 2009, she was designated as a justice of the Appellate Division of the New York Supreme Court, First Judicial Department by Governor David Paterson. She served as an associate justice of the Appellate Division from 2009 until 2013.

On April 5, 2013, following the death of New York Court of Appeals Judge Theodore T. Jones, Abdus-Salaam was nominated by Governor Andrew Cuomo to fill the resulting vacancy on New York's highest court. She was confirmed by the New York State Senate without opposition in a voice vote held May 6, 2013. She became the first female African-American judge to serve on the New York Court of Appeals.

USA Today described Abdus-Salaam as a liberal voice on the bench. In 2016, she authored the opinion of the Court in In Re Brooke S.B. v. Elizabeth A. C.C., a landmark decision allowing the domestic partners of biological parents to seek child custody or visitation in circumstances where the partners had decided to conceive and raise a child together.

== Personal life ==
Abdus-Salaam's second husband, James Hatcher, was the son of Andrew Hatcher, who worked as a press officer for John F. Kennedy. Her third husband was Hector Nova, from whom she was divorced in 2005. Abdus-Salaam married her fourth husband, Episcopal priest Gregory A. Jacobs, in June 2016.

Abdus-Salaam's religious affiliation has been the subject of conflicting reports. It was widely reported that Abdus-Salaam was the first Muslim to serve as a judge of the New York Court of Appeals. Following Abdus-Salaam's death, Court of Appeals spokesperson Gary Spencer stated that she had never converted to Islam, but had merely retained the last name of her first husband. However, in an article on Abdus-Salaam's death, NBC News described Abdus-Salaam as "the first Muslim woman to serve as a U.S. judge" and added that her family asserted that she "[had] not been a practicing Muslim for 20 years".

=== Death ===
Abdus-Salaam was found dead near West 132nd Street in Manhattan on the afternoon of April 12, 2017. Her fully clothed body was found floating in the Hudson River hours after she was reported missing from her home in Harlem.

On April 13, police stated that the death of Abdus-Salaam appeared to be a suicide, and added that she had been struggling with depression. On April 18, however, police told reporters that the death was considered "suspicious" due to the lack of witnesses and lack of a suicide note. An autopsy, while reaching no conclusion about the cause of Abdus-Salaam's death, found bruises on her neck and water in her lungs; this data indicated that she had likely been alive when she entered the river. The bruising could have been caused by someone choking Abdus-Salaam, or could have resulted from the recovery of her body from the river. On April 21, police said they had recovered video from the night of April 11 that showed Abdus-Salaam, dressed in the clothes in which she was found dead, walking around Riverbank State Park along the Hudson River for hours. Police added that the final images captured by the camera showed her standing near the water.

On May 3, the New York Police Department announced that its investigation into the death of Abdus-Salaam was complete, and that investigators believed she had committed suicide. The medical examiner concluded that the cause of death was drowning and that the manner of death was suicide.

== See also ==
- List of African-American jurists
- List of first women lawyers and judges in New York

Legal offices
Preceded by Theodore Jones	Associate Judge of the New York Court of Appeals; 2013–2017	Succeeded by Paul G. Feinman
