= Seth P. Waxman =

Former United States Solicitor General

Seth Waxman
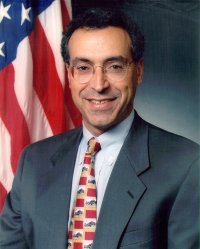
- Official portrait, c. 1998

41st Solicitor General of the United States
- In office November 13, 1997 – January 20, 2001
- President: Bill Clinton
- Preceded by: Walter Dellinger (acting)
- Succeeded by: Barbara Underwood (acting)

Personal details
- Born: Seth Paul Waxman; November 28, 1951 (age 74) Hartford, Connecticut, U.S.
- Party: Democratic
- Education: Harvard University (BA); Yale University (JD)

Seth Paul Waxman (born November 28, 1951) is an American lawyer who served as the 41st Solicitor General of the United States from 1997 to 2001. He is the co-chairman of the appellate and Supreme Court litigation practice group at the law firm Wilmer Cutler Pickering Hale and Dorr. As of 2022, he has appeared before the Supreme Court more than 80 times.

== Early life and education ==
Waxman was born in 1951 in Hartford, Connecticut. His family is Jewish and lived in West Hartford, Connecticut. After graduating from Conard High School in 1969, Waxman studied social studies at Harvard University, graduating in 1973 with a Bachelor of Arts, summa cum laude. He spent a year in Kenya as a Rockefeller Fellow before attending Yale Law School, where he was managing editor of the Yale Law Journal. He graduated in 1977 with a Juris Doctor.

== Career ==
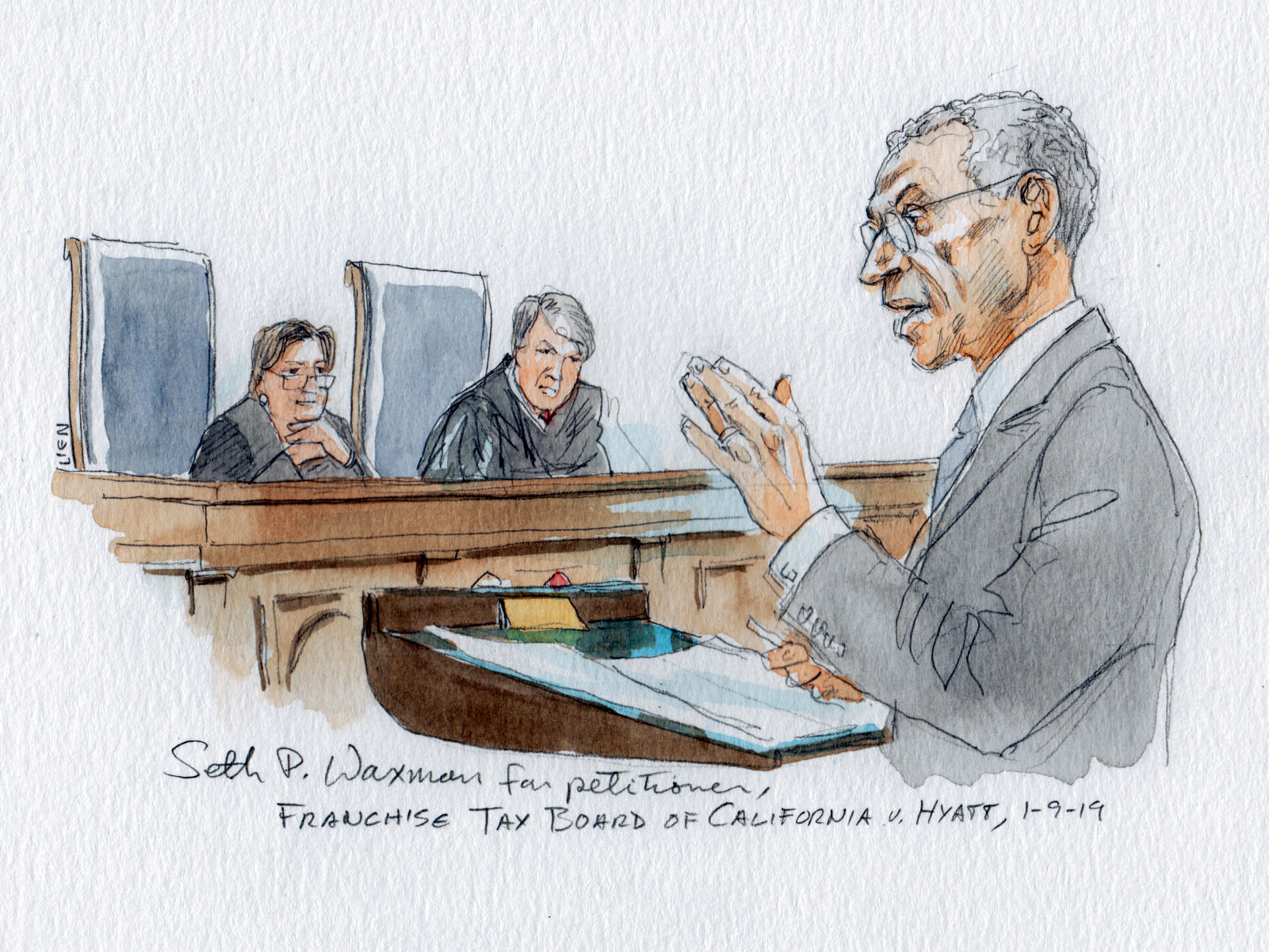
Courtroom sketch of Waxman at a 2019 Supreme Court oral argument

After law school, Waxman spent one year as a law clerk to Judge Gerhard Gesell of the U.S. District Court for the District of Columbia. Thereafter, he entered the private practice of law with the boutique law firm Miller, Cassidy, Larroca & Lewin (now part of Baker Botts), where he specialized in complex criminal, civil, and appellate litigation. Waxman has received substantial recognition for his pro bono work, including the American Bar Association's Pro Bono Publico award and the Anti-Defamation League's Benjamin N. Cardozo Certificate of Merit.

Waxman joined the United States Department of Justice in May 1994. Prior to being appointed solicitor general, he served in a number of other positions in the Department of Justice, including acting solicitor general, acting deputy attorney general, principal deputy solicitor general, and associate deputy attorney general.

Waxman made the oral argument to the Supreme Court on behalf of the petitioners in Boumediene v. Bush, in which the court upheld habeas corpus rights for detainees at Guantanamo Bay. Waxman also made oral arguments to the Supreme Court regarding arbitrary application of FCC sanctions on public nudity. In these arguments he used the friezes decorating the courtroom to illustrate how some nudity is acceptable in a public setting.

Waxman also made the oral argument to the Supreme Court on behalf of the respondent in Roper v. Simmons, in which the court held that the execution of minors was unconstitutional under the cruel and unusual clause of the 8th Amendment. Furthermore, he also represented Harvard University in the case Students for Fair Admissions v. President and Fellows of Harvard College.

Waxman is a member of Brendan Dassey's legal team and has been featured in Netflix's true crime documentary series Making a Murderer.

== Affiliations ==
Waxman has long been active in Bar, community and school organizations. He is a fellow of the American Bar Foundation, a member of the ABA's Standing Committee on Professionalism, a current and past ex officio member of several committees of the Judicial Conference of the United States, an ex officio member of the American Law Institute, and a member of the Visiting Committee for Harvard College.

== See also ==
- Barack Obama Supreme Court candidates
- List of Jewish American jurists

Legal offices
| Preceded by Walter Dellinger; Acting | Solicitor General of the United States; 1997–2001 | Succeeded by Barbara Underwood; Acting |
