= Eugene M. Fahey =

American judge (born 1951)

Associate Judge of the New York Court of Appeals
- In office February 9, 2015 – December 31, 2021
- Appointed by: Andrew Cuomo
- Preceded by: Robert S. Smith
- Succeeded by: Shirley Troutman

Personal details
- Born: September 1, 1951 (age 75) Buffalo, New York, U.S.
- Party: Democratic
- Other political affiliations: Conservative (1993)
- Education: University at Buffalo (BA, JD, MA)

Eugene M. Fahey (born September 1, 1951) is an American judge who served as an Associate Judge of the New York Court of Appeals from 2015 to 2021.

== Education and early career ==
Born in Buffalo, New York, Fahey attended St. Joseph's Collegiate Institute in the Town of Tonawanda, and received a Bachelor of Arts (cum laude) from State University of New York at Buffalo in 1974, and was elected to the Buffalo Common Council, serving from 1978 to 1983. He received a Juris Doctor from SUNY Buffalo Law School in 1984, and was then a law clerk to New York Court of Claims Judge Edgar C. NeMoyer before entering private practice in 1985. Fahey again served on the Buffalo Common Council from 1988 to 1994, and ran for Mayor of Buffalo in 1993, but was defeated in the Democratic primary by nearly a two-to-one margin by Anthony Masiello. Fahey remained in the race as the Conservative Party candidate, but did not actively campaign, and received only a small proportion of the vote in the general election, also won by Masiello.

== Judicial career ==
=== Lower courts ===
Fahey was elected to Buffalo City Court in 1994, where he served for two years before being elected to New York State’s highest trial court, the New York Supreme Court, in 1996. There, he handled both civil and criminal matters. He was notable for issuing a ruling in 2000 that the authority responsible for constructing the Peace Bridge had not properly completed the environmental impact assessment required to complete a twin-span bridge. The ruling effectively limited the bridge to one span.

Governor George Pataki appointed Fahey to the Appellate Division, Fourth Department in December 2006. Fahey served on the Appellate Division for over eight years, during which he wrote notable opinions:

- upholding the state's Marriage Equality Act, which allowed same-sex marriages in New York State;
- allowing depositions of foreign witnesses using video technology in certain circumstances;
- clarifying when someone can request electronic material from government agencies under the Freedom of Information Law;
- holding that sex offenders have a right to effective assistance of counsel in civil confinement proceedings; and
- dissenting from a ruling affirming a criminal conviction in a case where the prosecutor was accused of mischaracterizing DNA evidence (which was later reversed by the New York State Court of Appeals).

=== New York State Court of Appeals ===
In January 2015, Fahey was nominated to the New York State Court of Appeals by Governor Andrew M. Cuomo. The New York State Senate unanimously confirmed his nomination on February 9, 2015. Fahey retired from the court on December 31, 2021, after reaching the constitutional mandatory retirement age of 70.

==== Notable opinions ====
In Davis v South Nassau Communities Hosp., 26 NY3d 563 [2015], Fahey concluded that "where a medical provider has administered to a patient medication that impairs or could impair the patient's ability to safely operate an automobile, the medical provider has a duty to third parties to warn the patient of that danger."

In People v Otis Boone (30 NY3d 521 [2017]), Fahey wrote that because of the high error rate of eyewitness identifications, a trial court must caution a jury about the potential fallibility of an identification of a defendant by a person of a different race when the defendant asks for such an instruction.

In Expressions Hair Design v Schneiderman, 32 NY3d 382 [2018], Fahey explained that state law allows businesses to post different prices for customers paying with cash or check and customers paying with credit card.

In Deutsche Bank Natl. v Flagstar Capital Mkts., 32 NY3d 139 [2018], Fahey wrote that parties to a contract cannot use certain language to "pause" the statute of limitations period.

In People v Aleynikov, 31 NY3d 383 [2018], Fahey wrote for the court when it upheld a defendant's criminal conviction for uploading proprietary source code to a computer server without authorization.

In People v Wiggins, 31 NY3d 1 [2018], Fahey explained that a delay between a defendant's arrest and plea exceeding six years violated constitutional speedy trial protections.

In Matter of Nonhuman Rights Project, Inc. v Lavery, (31 NY3d 1054 [2018] [concurring]), Fahey concurred in the Court’s decision to deny an animal rights group’s motion for leave to appeal in a habeas corpus case brought on behalf of two confined chimpanzees, writing separately to explain: “The issue whether a nonhuman animal has a fundamental right to liberty protected by the writ of habeas corpus is profound and far-reaching. It speaks to our relationship with all the life around us. Ultimately, we will not be able to ignore it. While it may be arguable that a chimpanzee is not a 'person,' there is no doubt that it is not merely a thing.”

In Williams v Beemiller, Inc. (33 NY3d 523 [2019] [dissent]), Fahey dissented from the court's decision that New York State courts cannot exercise "long arm" jurisdiction over out-of-state gun merchants who place firearms in the stream of commerce knowing that such weapons will be resold for illegal purposes in this state.

In People v Cadman Williams (35 NY3d 24 [2020]), Fahey, writing for the court, held that a trial court must hold an evidentiary hearing (a "Frye hearing") before admitting DNA evidence derived from proprietary “black box” technology that cannot be reviewed by relevant independent experts and the scientific community at large.

In Lindsay Lohan v Take-Two Interactive Software Inc et al [New York Court of Appeals (No 24, pp1-11, 29 March 2018)], Fahey found a computer game’s character “could be construed a portrait” and that “could constitute an invasion of an individual’s privacy” but, on the facts of the case, the likeness was “not sufficiently strong” because the “… artistic renderings are an indistinct, satirical representation of the style, look and persona of a modern, beach-going young woman... that is not recognizable as the plaintiff”.

== Personal life ==
Fahey is married to Colleen Maroney-Fahey, and they live in Buffalo, New York. They have one daughter.

Legal offices
Preceded by Robert S. Smith	Associate Justice of the New York Court of Appeals; 2015–2021	Succeeded by Shirley Troutman
