= New York Supreme Court, Appellate Division, Second Department =

Court in New York State

Coordinates: 40°41′44″N 73°59′35″W

Supreme Court of the State of New York, Appellate Division, Second Judicial Department
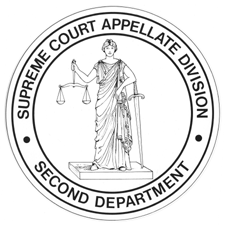
- Seal of the Second Department

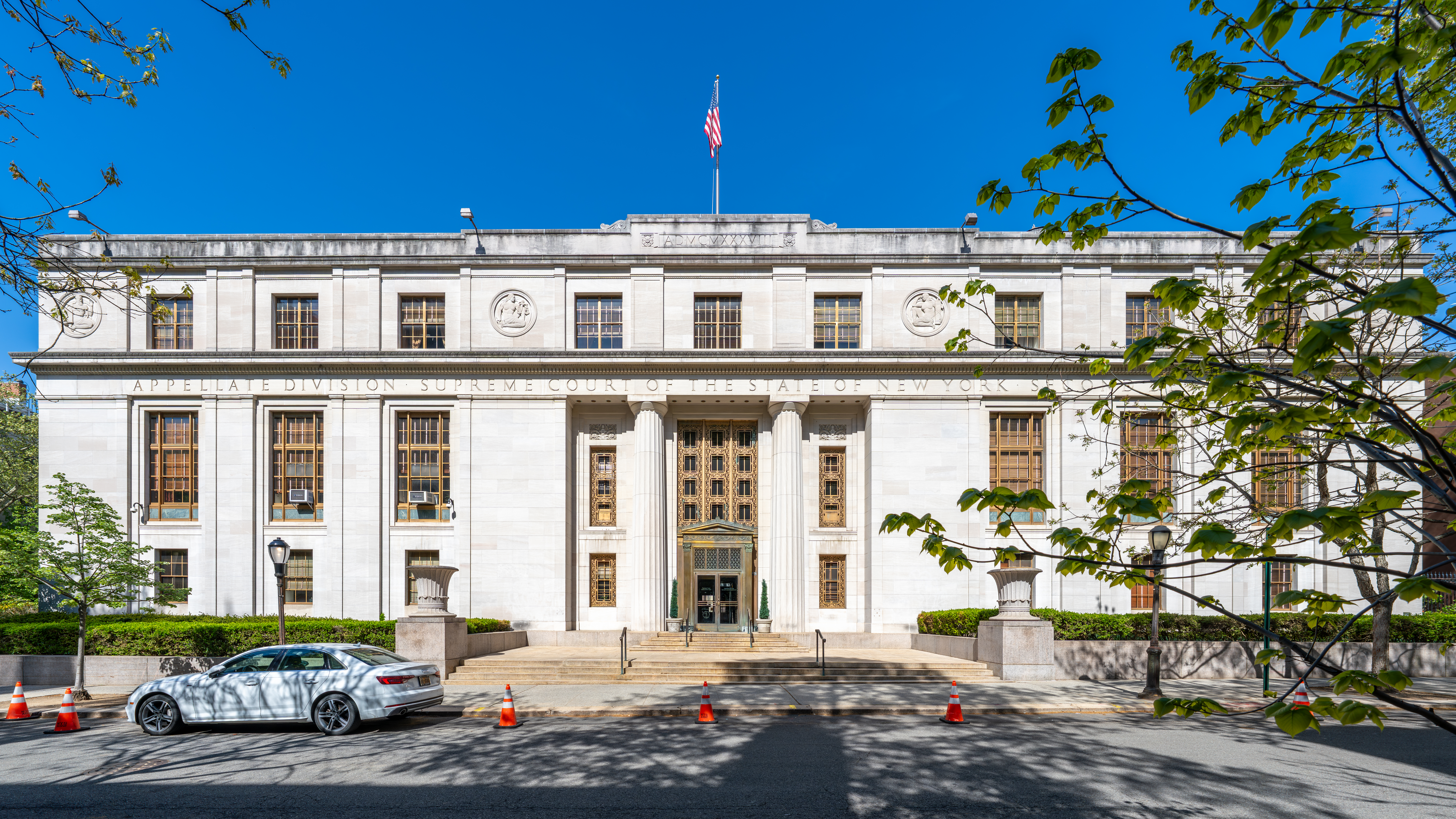
- Courthouse in Brooklyn Heights
- Interactive map of Supreme Court of the State of New York, Appellate Division, Second Judicial Department
- Established: 1894
- Location: Brooklyn, New York
- Composition method: Gubernatorial appointment
- Authorised by: Constitution of the State of New York
- Appeals to: New York Court of Appeals
- Number of positions: 7 plus additional justices
- Website: nycourts.gov/courts/AD2/

Presiding Justice
- Currently: Hector LaSalle
- Since: 2021

The Supreme Court of the State of New York, Appellate Division, Second Judicial Department, or simply the Second Department, is one of the four geographical components of the Supreme Court, Appellate Division, the intermediate appellate court of the State of New York. Its courthouse is located in Brooklyn, New York City.

The court has jurisdiction to hear civil and criminal appeals from the trial courts located in 10 counties: Dutchess, Orange, Putnam, Rockland, and Westchester in the Hudson Valley, Nassau and Suffolk on Long Island, and Kings (Brooklyn), Queens, and Richmond (Staten Island) in New York City. These counties comprise 8% of New York State's land area, yet account for more than 50% of its population.

As with all four departments of the Appellate Division, the Second Department was created in its current form by the Constitution of the State of New York, adopted at the 1894 constitutional convention. The constitution fixes the number of justices at seven, but the governor may designate additional justices if there is a need. The court currently has 22 judicial seats.

As of 2021, the Second Department is the busiest appellate court in the United States and decides 65% of all cases in the Appellate Division. The court issued more than 3,500 rulings in 2017. In 1966, its caseload surpassed that of the First Department, based in Manhattan.

The Second Department courthouse is located on Monroe Place in Brooklyn Heights and was designed by Slee & Bryson in the neoclassical style. Construction began on March 1, 1937, and the courthouse opened on September 28, 1938.

== List of presiding justices ==
Presiding justices
No.	Name	Years	Ref.
1	Charles F. Brown	1896	
2	William W. Goodrich	1896–1903	
3	Michael H. Hirschberg	1904–1911	
4	Almet Francis Jenks	1911–1921	
5	Abel E. Blackmar	1921–1922	
6	William J. Kelly	1923–1927	
7	Edward Lazansky	1927–1942	
8	Frederick P. Close	1943–1945	
9	Harry E. Lewis	1946–1948	
10	Gerald Nolan	1948–1961	
11	George Beldock	1961–1970	
12	Marcus G. Christ	1970–1971	
13	Samuel Rabin	1971–1974	
14	Frank A. Gulotta	1974–1977	
15	Milton Mollen	1978–1990	
16	Guy James Mangano	1990–2001	
17	A. Gail Prudenti	2002–2011	
18	Randall T. Eng	2012–2017	
19	Alan D. Scheinkman	2018–2020	
20	Hector LaSalle	2021–present	

== See also ==
- New York Court of Appeals
- New York State Supreme Court, Appellate Division, First Department
- New York State Supreme Court, Appellate Division, Fourth Department
