= Irving Hubbs =

American judge

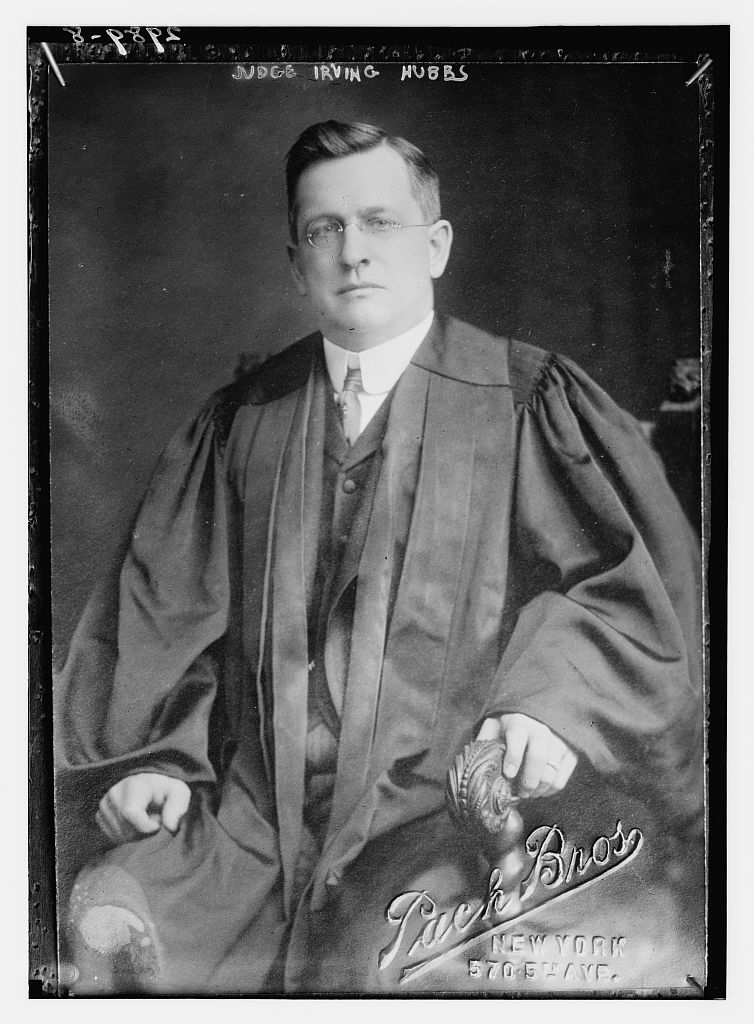
- Hubbs circa 1915
- Born: Irving George Hubbs; November 18, 1870; Sandy Creek, New York
- Died: July 23, 1952 (aged 81); Pulaski, New York
- Spouse: Nancy Clark Dixson (m. 1893)
- Children: 3 (one of whom died in infancy)

Irving George Hubbs (November 18, 1870 – July 22, 1952) was an American lawyer and politician.

== Biography ==
He was born on November 18, 1870, in Sandy Creek, Oswego County, New York, to George L. Hubbs and Catharine Snyder. He graduated from Pulaski Academy in 1887, and from Cornell University Law School. He was admitted to the bar in 1891, and practiced law in Pulaski, New York, until 1911 when he was elected a justice of the New York Supreme Court (5th District). From 1918 on, he sat on the Appellate Division, Fourth Dept. and was Presiding Justice from 1923 on.

In 1928, he was elected on the Republican ticket to the New York Court of Appeals. On November 30, 1939, he tendered his resignation from the bench to take effect on December 31, 1939. He died on July 22, 1952, at his home in Pulaski, New York.
