= Paul Feinman =

American judge and attorney (1960-2021)

Associate Judge of the New York Court of Appeals
- In office June 21, 2017 – March 23, 2021
- Appointed by: Andrew Cuomo
- Preceded by: Sheila Abdus-Salaam
- Succeeded by: Anthony Cannataro

Personal details
- Born: Paul George Feinman; January 26, 1960 Merrick, New York, U.S.
- Died: March 31, 2021 (aged 61) New York City, New York, U.S.
- Party: Democratic
- Spouse: Robert Ostergaard (m. 2013)
- Education: Columbia University (BA); University of Minnesota (JD)

Paul George Feinman (January 26, 1960 – March 31, 2021) was an American attorney who served as an associate judge of the New York Court of Appeals, New York's highest court, from June 2017 to March 2021.

Feinman spent 20 years as a state judge prior to his elevation to the Court of Appeals, first as a justice of the New York Supreme Court (the trial-level court of general jurisdiction in the New York State Unified Court System), and the New York Supreme Court, Appellate Division (the intermediate appellate courts in New York State).

He was the first openly gay judge on the appeals court. At the time of his confirmation by State Senate in 2017, he said, "Certainly my entire career has been about promoting equal access and equal justice for all and I hope I add to the diversity of perspectives that the court considers."

== Early life and education ==
Feinman was born to a Jewish family in Merrick, New York and attended John F. Kennedy High School. His father was a small business owner in New York City, his mother a bookkeeper and later a Nassau County Department of Social Services employee.

Feinman earned an undergraduate degree in French literature from Columbia University in 1981. He attended the University of Minnesota Law School on a full scholarship.

== Legal career ==
Feinman began his legal career as a public defender with the Legal Aid Society, working in Nassau County and then in New York City; at the time, the courts had a crowded criminal docket due to the crack epidemic.

Feinman then served as law clerk to Justice Angela Mazzarelli for seven and a half years, from 1989 to 1996, first when Mazzarelli was on the state trial court bench and then when she was on the state Appellate Division. Feinman became involved in the L.G.B.T. Bar Association and in Democratic politics in the Manhattan neighborhoods of Chelsea and the West Village.

== Judicial career ==
In 1996, he won an election to the New York City Civil Court bench, and at times was an acting New York Supreme Court justice. In 2007, Feinman was elected to the Supreme Court; in 2012, Governor Andrew Cuomo elevated him to the New York Supreme Court, Appellate Division, First Department. Feinman was a member of the Supreme Court Justices Association of the State of New York, serving first as its first vice president and then as its president. Feinman also served as treasurer of the Citywide Association of Supreme Court Justices in New York, and was president of the International Association of LGBT Judges from 2008 to 2011.

In June 2017, Cuomo nominated Feinman to the New York Court of Appeals, the state's highest court, to the seat left vacant by the death of Sheila Abdus-Salaam. He was unanimously confirmed by the New York Senate the same month. Feinman was the first openly LGBT person to serve on New York's highest court.

Feinman was regarded as having a "thoughtful and methodical" judicial approach. Judge David Saxe, who served alongside Feinman on the Appellate Division bench, considers Feinman "a moderate with progressive instincts."

== Personal life ==
Feinman married web publisher Jay Robert Ostergaard in 2013. The couple lived on Roosevelt Island.

Feinman was a Francophile and fan of the New York Mets.

=== Health and death ===
Feinman was diagnosed with acute myeloid leukemia in 2015. He abruptly retired from the Court of Appeals on March 23, 2021, due to health concerns. On March 31, 2021, he died from leukemia at a hospital in Manhattan at the age of 61.

== See also ==
- List of Jewish American jurists
- List of LGBT jurists in the United States
- List of LGBT state supreme court justices in the United States
- LGBT culture in New York City
- List of LGBT people from New York City

Legal offices
Preceded by Sheila Abdus-Salaam	Associate Justice of the New York Court of Appeals; 2017–2021	Succeeded by Anthony Cannataro
