= Janet DiFiore =

American judge (born 1955)

Chief Judge of the New York Court of Appeals
- In office February 8, 2016 – August 31, 2022
- Appointed by: Andrew Cuomo
- Preceded by: Eugene F. Pigott Jr. (acting)
- Succeeded by: Anthony Cannataro (acting)

District Attorney of Westchester County
- In office January 1, 2006 – January 26, 2016
- Preceded by: Jeanine Pirro
- Succeeded by: Anthony Scarpino

Personal details
- Born: Janet Marie DiFiore; August 9, 1955 (age 70) Mount Vernon, New York, U.S.
- Party: Republican (before 2007); Democratic (2007–present)
- Education: Long Island University, Post (BA); St. John's University, New York (JD)

Janet Marie DiFiore (born August 9, 1955) is an American lawyer and judge who served as the Chief Judge of New York Court of Appeals from 2016 to 2022. DiFiore was born in Mount Vernon, New York, and graduated from Long Island University and St. John's University School of Law. As a practicing attorney, DiFiore worked in a law firm and in the Westchester District Attorney's Office. DiFiore then was elected a judge of the Westchester County Court, and was subsequently named a justice of the New York Supreme Court (the state trial court in New York), serving in that post from 2003 to 2005. DiFiore left the bench to become district attorney of Westchester County, New York, in 2006; she stayed in that position nearly a decade, until Governor Andrew Cuomo nominated her to the New York Court of Appeals. Her nomination was confirmed by the New York State Senate. She started her term as the Chief Judge of the Court of Appeals in New York on January 21, 2016. She resigned on July 11, 2022, effective August 31, 2022, amid misconduct proceedings into her alleged attempt to influence a disciplinary hearing.

== Early life and education ==
Janet Marie DiFiore was born on August 9, 1955, in Mount Vernon, New York, the only child of Italian immigrants, and is a lifelong resident of Westchester County. She graduated from Mount Vernon High School.

DiFiore graduated from C.W. Post College at Long Island University and St. John's University School of Law.

== Legal career ==
While a law student, DiFiore interned for Westchester District Attorney Carl A. Vergari. After graduating from law school in 1981, DiFiore became an assistant district attorney in the Westchester District Attorney's Office.

DiFiore left in 1987 to work part-time at the law firm of Goodrich & Bendish while raising her family; she worked at the firm until 1994. During this period, DiFiore also served as deputy village attorney for Bronxville, New York. In 1994, DiFiore returned to the office to serve as chief of the narcotics bureau under DA Jeanine F. Pirro.

In 1998, DiFiore was elected a judge of the Westchester County Court. She served in that position from 1999 to 2002. From 2003 to 2005, DiFiore was a justice of the New York Supreme Court (the state trial court in New York).

In November 2005, DiFiore was elected Westchester County district attorney, succeeding Pirro. DiFiore defeated Democrat Tony Castro in the race. She took office the following year. As head of the Westchester County District Attorney's Office, DiFiore led an office of more than 230 employees.

Soon after assuming office, DiFiore approved new DNA testing to be used in the case of Jeffrey Mark Deskovic, who was wrongfully convicted of the rape and murder of a classmate. Such testing had been refused by Pirro, DiFiore's predecessor. The evidence exonerated Deskovic, and he was released from prison after 16 years. DiFiore subsequently set up an inquiry which reviewed the errors in the case and recommended reforms to prevent future wrongful convictions, such as videotaping police interrogations.

In August 2007, DiFiore switched party affiliations, from Republican to Democratic. She was twice reelected district attorney, in 2009 and 2013. In September 2009, DiFiore defeated Castro in the Democratic primary and in the general election defeated Castro (who ran on the Independence Party of New York and Working Families Party ballot lines) and Republican candidate Dan Schorr. In 2013, DiFiore ran unopposed.

From 2011 to 2013, DiFiore was chairwoman of the New York Joint Commission on Public Ethics, a body to which she was appointed by Governor Andrew M. Cuomo. DiFiore resigned this position to run for reelection as district attorney. In 2014, Cuomo appointed DiFiore to a juvenile justice commission. DiFiore is also co-chairwoman of the New York Justice Task Force, which investigates wrongful convictions; she was appointed to the task force by Jonathan Lippman, the Chief Judge of the New York Court of Appeals. In July 2022, she announced her resignation as chief judge amid misconduct proceedings, allegedly attempting to influence a disciplinary hearing. Her term ended on August 31, 2022.

=== Election results ===
Westchester County District Attorney general election, 2005
Party	Candidate	Votes	%	±%
Republican	Janet DiFiore	80,823		
Independence	Janet DiFiore	8,251		
Conservative	Janet DiFiore	8,375		
Democratic	Tony Castro	87,090		
Working Families	Tony Castro	3,833		
Right to Life	Anthony J. DeCintio, Jr.	2,892		
Total valid votes		191,269		

Westchester County District Attorney primary election, 2009
Party	Candidate	Votes	%	±%
Democratic	Janet DiFiore	19,728		
Democratic	Tony Castro	11,621		
Write-ins	Various	3		
Total valid votes		31,352		

Westchester County District Attorney general election, 2009
Party	Candidate	Votes	%	±%
Democratic	Janet DiFiore	77,292		
Conservative	Janet DiFiore	7,200		
Republican	Dan Schorr	56,618		
Independence	Tony Castro	12,032		
Working Families	Tony Castro	3,293		
Right to Life	Anthony J. DeCintio, Jr.	2,347		
Write-ins	Various	10		
Total valid votes		158,792		

Westchester County District Attorney general election, 2013
Party	Candidate	Votes	%	±%
Democratic	Janet DiFiore	96,322		
Conservative	Janet DiFiore	26,346		
Working Families	Janet DiFiore	6,210		
Write-ins	Various	324		
Total valid votes		129,202		

=== New York Court of Appeals ===
Thirty-three people, including DiFiore, applied to succeed Lippman as chief judge of the New York Court of Appeals, following Lippman's mandatory retirement at the end of 2015. DiFiore was included as one of seven finalists chosen by the state Commission on Judicial Nomination, led by former chief judge Judith S. Kaye. Other notable finalists included Michael J. Garcia, former U.S. Attorney for the Southern District of New York, who in 2016 also joined the New York Court of Appeals, having been appointed to fill another vacancy.

On December 1, 2015, Governor Andrew Cuomo nominated DiFiore to serve as chief judge. Following a procedural delay, the New York State Senate unanimously confirmed DiFiore to the position by voice vote on January 21, 2016. DiFiore was sworn in by Cuomo at the Court of Appeals building on February 8, 2016.

The chief judge technically serves a fourteen-year term, but the New York State Constitution provides a mandatory retirement age for Court of Appeals justices.

In May 2022, DiFiore writing for the majority struck down the redistricting maps approved by the state legislature.

In a July 2022 interview, DiFiore announced her resignation as the chief judge of New York effective in August 2022.

== Personal life ==
DiFiore is married to Dennis E. Glazer, a retired lawyer. The couple met on the first day of law school, and married on August 15, 1981, at the Westchester Country Club in Rye. She is the mother of three children, Alexandra, Joseph and Michael, now all adults. She lives in Bronxville, New York.

== See also ==
- List of female state supreme court justices

Legal offices
Preceded by Eugene F. Pigott Jr. Acting	Chief Judge of the New York Court of Appeals; 2016–2022	Succeeded by Anthony Cannataro; Acting
