= Adirondack League Club v. Sierra Club =

- Court: New York Court of Appeals
- Argued: October 22, 1998
- Decided: December 17, 1998
- Citations: 92 N.Y.2d 591; 706 N.E.2d 1192; 684 N.Y.S.2d 168

Case history
- Prior history: 201 A.D.2d 225, 615 N.Y.S.2d 788 (1994)

Court membership
- Chief judge: Judith S. Kaye
- Associate judges: Joseph W. Bellacosa, Howard A. Levine, George Bundy Smith, Carmen Beauchamp Ciparick, Richard C. Wesley, Denman

Case opinions
- Majority: Ciparick, joined by Smith, Wesley, Denman
- Dissent: Bellacosa
- Kaye, Levine took no part in the consideration or decision of the case.

Adirondack League Club vs. Sierra Club was a court case decided on December 17, 1998, by New York's highest court, the New York Court of Appeals, denying the defendants' motions for summary judgment that the South Branch of the Moose River flowing through Adirondack League Club property was a public highway, but holding that recreational use can be considered in determining if a river is a public highway. The case was sent back to the trial court for additional review. However, the case was settled before there was a final court determination as to whether the river was a public highway. The settlement, which can be found under Appendix 12 of the Moose River Plains Wild Forest Unit Management Plan, allows the public to use the river at certain times of the year and under certain conditions.

Although Adirondack League Club vs. Sierra Club established that recreational use can be considered in determining whether a river is a public highway, in Friends of Thayer Lake, LLC v. Brown, the New York Court of Appeals declined to answer whether the capacity for recreational use alone is sufficient to prove that a river is a public highway, and sent the case back to the trial court for consideration of "the Waterway's historical and prospective commercial utility, the Waterway's historical accessibility to the public, the relative ease of passage by canoe, the volume of historical travel, and the volume of prospective commercial and recreational use." The trial court ruled in favor of the landowners, and the decision was not appealed.

== "Navigable-in-fact" ==
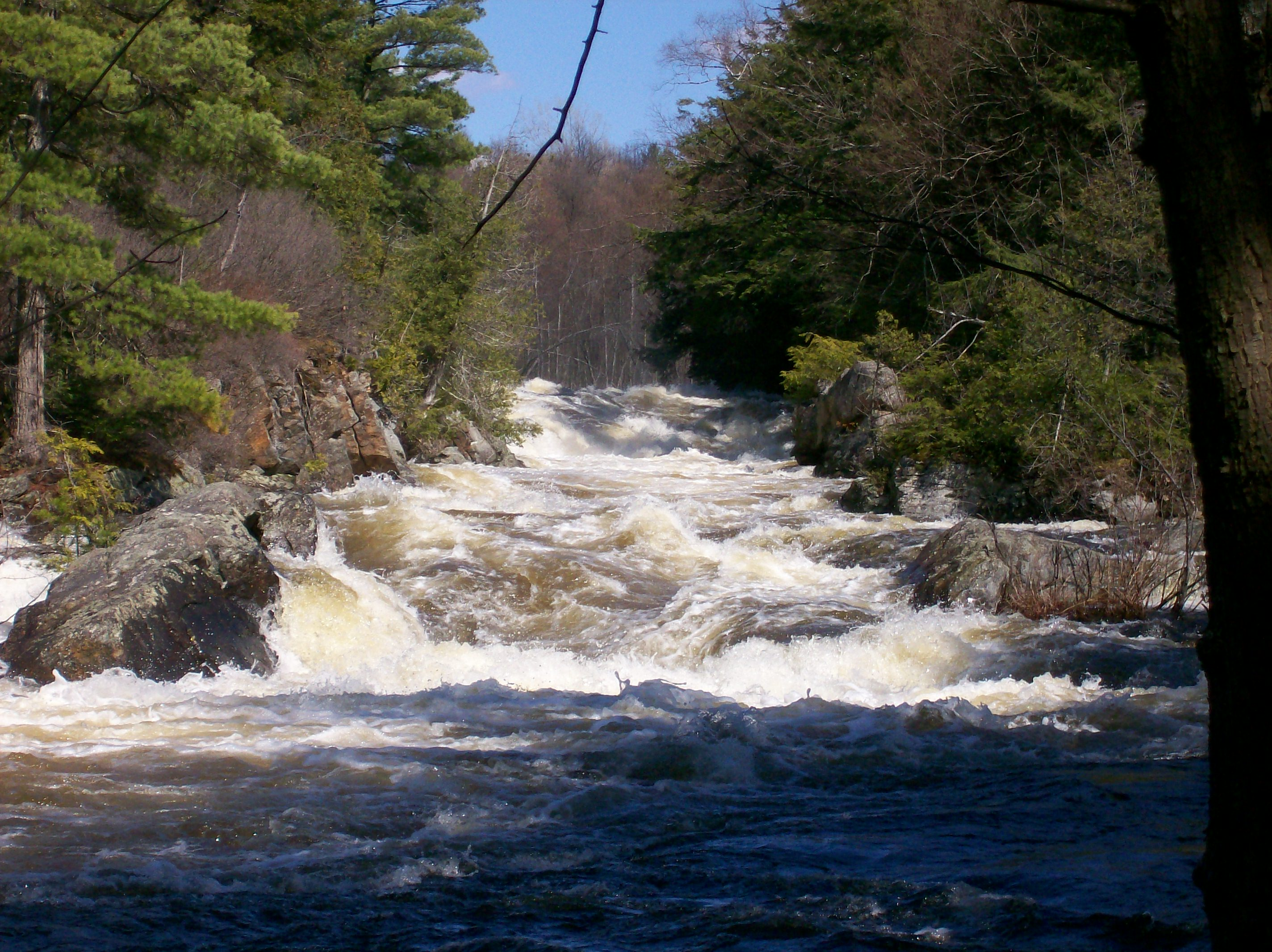
The Raquette River at Colton, the upper end of the section considered in Morgan v. King, in which the Court of Appeals held the river was not a public highway.

Rivers were once important means of transporting commodities such as logs to market, and in the nineteenth century, the New York legislature declared numerous rivers public highways using their power of eminent domain. In contrast to rivers declared public highways by statute, the term "navigable-in-fact" generally refers to rivers of such importance that they are considered public highways under the common law. The Court of Appeals states that "This rule is longstanding and recognizes that some waterways are of such practical utility that private ownership from the time of the original grant from the State or sovereign is subject to an easement for public travel (see, id., at 458)."

Every state has its own definition of navigable-in-fact, and the federal government has multiple definitions of "navigable" that are applied depending on the circumstance, such as the extent of regulations, admiralty jurisdiction, or title.

New York's definition of "navigable-in-fact" was established by the 1866 Morgan v. King case, which involved the 23 miles of the Raquette River between Colton, New York and Raymondville, at an average width of 18 rods (297 feet). The legislature had attempted to declare the river a public highway by eminent domain in 1850, but had not provided appropriate compensation to affected riparian owners. A watermill owned by the defendant King detained plaintiff Morgan's logs in 1854. Morgan claimed the river was a public highway and therefore King should pay him for his logs. The Court of Appeals needed to determine whether the river was a public highway. In Morgan v. King, the Court of Appeals provided the original definition for what would be considered a public highway in New York:

The true rule is, that the public have a right of way in every stream which is capable, in its natural state and its ordinary volume of water, of transporting, in a condition fit for market, the products of the forests or mines, or of the tillage of the soil upon its banks. It is not essential to the right that the property to be transported should be carried in vessels, or in some other mode, whereby it can be guided by the agency of man, provided it can ordinarily be carried safely without such guidance. Nor is it necessary that the stream should be capable of being thus navigated against its current, as well as in the direction of its current. If it is so far navigable or floatable, in its natural state and its ordinary capacity, as to be of public use in the transportation of property, the public claim to such use ought to be liberally supported.

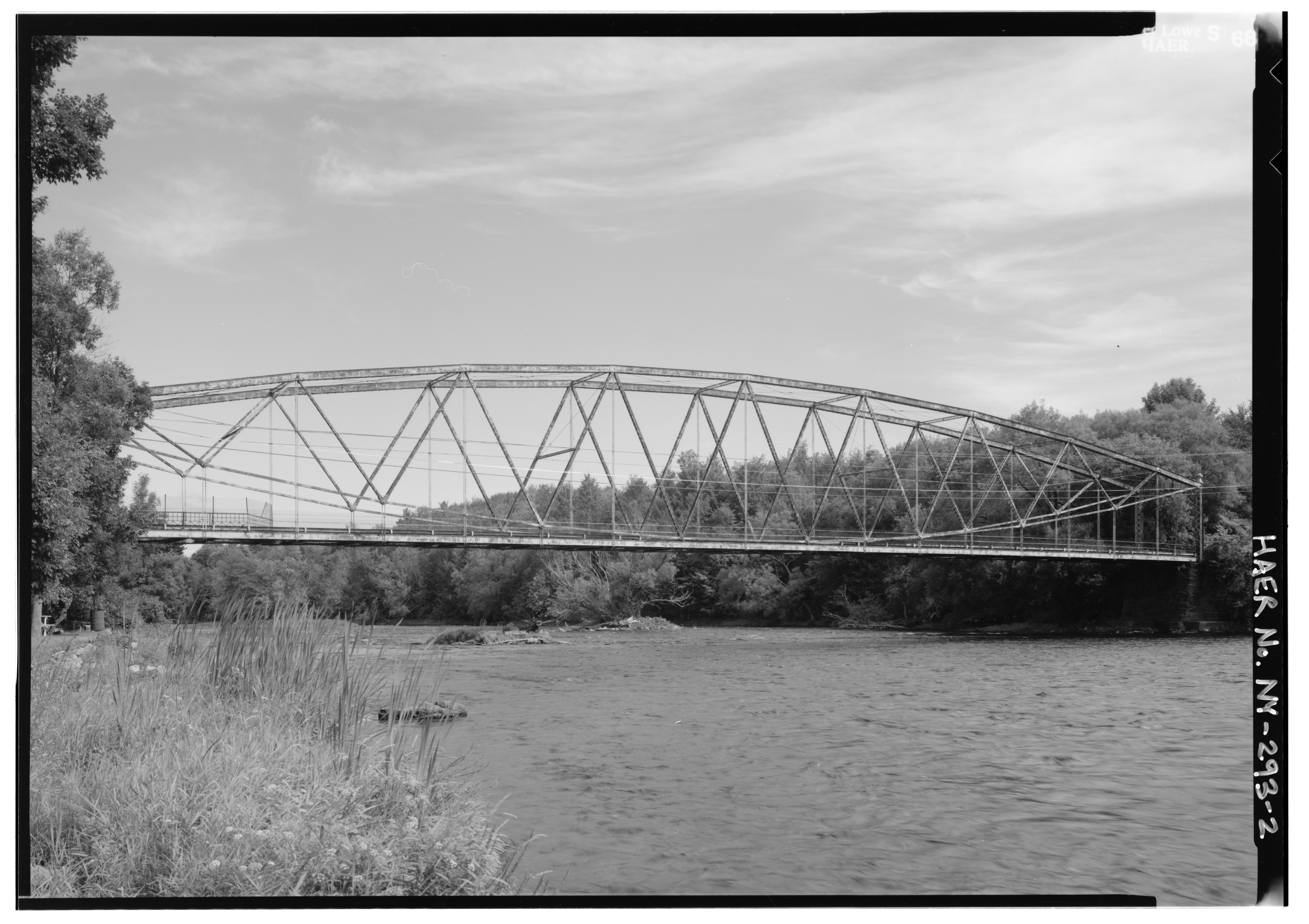
The Raquette River at Raymondville, the lower end of the section the Morgan court declared private property under the common law, stating "It would be going beyond the warrant of either principle or precedent to hold that a floatable capacity, so temporary, precarious and unprofitable, constituted the stream a public highway"

However, the Court of Appeals ruled regarding the nearly 300-foot wide, 23-mile section of the Raquette River "It would be going beyond the warrant of either principle or precedent to hold that a floatable capacity, so temporary, precarious and unprofitable, constituted the stream a public highway" and that the legislature recognized that the river was private "property that could not be taken for public use without compensation."

Like the federal courts, New York courts also use "navigability" definitions in cases pertaining to issues other than property rights, such as taxation and regulation. While the U.S. Supreme Court established for federal courts that "any reliance upon judicial precedent must be predicated upon careful appraisal of the purpose for which the concept of `navigability' was invoked in a particular case," a nuanced approach most recently applied by the U.S. Supreme Court in PPL Montana, New York courts have yet to make a similar distinction. Navigability precedents from taxation and regulation cases were cited in the Adirondack League Club vs. Sierra Club property rights case.

Before Adirondack League Club v. Sierra Club, New York statutory and case law had virtually no mention of recreational use in definitions of navigable-in-fact. The Adirondack League Club v. Sierra Club case was to decide whether recreational boating can be considered when determining whether or not a river was a public highway. The Court of Appeals summarized the disagreement between the parties about whether recreational use should be considered:

The parties differ regarding the type of evidence that will suffice to satisfy the standard of navigability-in-fact. Specifically, the parties differ on the extent to which recreational use should enter into the analysis. Appellant ALC contends that navigability references only commercial utility and that the focus thus should be on the South Branch's use as a logging river during the first half of this century. Reliance on recreational uses, ALC asserts, would disrupt settled expectations regarding private property and would expand the common-law rule beyond its traditional foundation. Defendants argue that recreational and commercial use are both properly part of the analysis.

== Case ==
The Sierra Club Atlantic Chapter was seeking a test case to use common law to open waterways that had been considered private property. They explored a number of rivers, including the Middle Branch of the St. Regis River, and the Beaver River between Lake Lila and Stillwater Reservoir. They settled on the South Branch of the Moose River running through the Adirondack League Club, which not only could be canoed and kayaked, but "was heavily used over the course of at least 50 years for floating logs to market." On June 15, 1991, five boaters in two canoes and one kayak embarked on a trip going down stream on the South Branch of the Moose River in New York. For the boaters to successfully complete their journey, they were forced by obstacles to make several stops to carry their boats over Adirondack League Club land.

Once the trip was completed the Adirondack League Club sued the boaters and the Sierra Club for trespass. The Adirondack League Club claimed the portion of the South Branch in question was private property and recreation was not part of the navigability-in-fact law already in place from Morgan v. King and should not be considered. The boaters argued that the South Branch of the Moose River was a public highway, and modern recreational use should be considered, in addition to historical commercial use.

== Decision ==
The New York Court of Appeals held that recreational use could be considered in determining whether a river was navigable-in-fact, but that factual questions remained that prevented them from deciding whether the South Branch of the Moose River was a public highway, and denied defendants' motion for summary judgement. The majority stated:

Like the Supreme Court and the two-Justice dissent in the Appellate Division below, we conclude that summary judgment is not warranted. We hold, however, that evidence of the river's capacity for recreational use is in line with the traditional test of navigability, that is, whether a river has a practical utility for trade or travel. Since questions of fact remain regarding whether the South Branch is navigable-in-fact, plaintiff is entitled to have the competing evidence weighed and the credibility of the witnesses assessed at trial. Accordingly, we modify.

The majority felt that the evidence regarding the historical log driving and modern recreational use were inconclusive. They wrote that "we are unable to conclude, as a matter of law, that the historical log drives on the South Branch were not accomplished by use of dams and other artificial augmentation of the river flow" and that "the evidence of recreational use does not compel the conclusion that substantially unobstructed travel on the South Branch can occur periodically or seasonally."

The case was sent back to the trial court, where it was settled in 2000, allowing public access to the river at certain times of the year and under certain conditions. However, there was never a final court determination as to whether the South Branch of the Moose River was a public highway.

== Cases using ALC v. SC as precedent ==
- Friends of Thayer Lake LLC v. Brown, 2016 NY Slip Op 3647 - NY: Court of Appeals 2016
- Mohawk Valley Ski Club, Inc. v. Town of Duanesburg, 304 A.D.2d 881 (2003)
- Dale v. Chisholm, 67 A.D.3d 626 (2009)
- LeBlanc v. Cleveland, 198 F.3d 353 (2d Cir. 1999)
