= Richard C. Wesley =

American judge (born 1949)

Richard Wesley
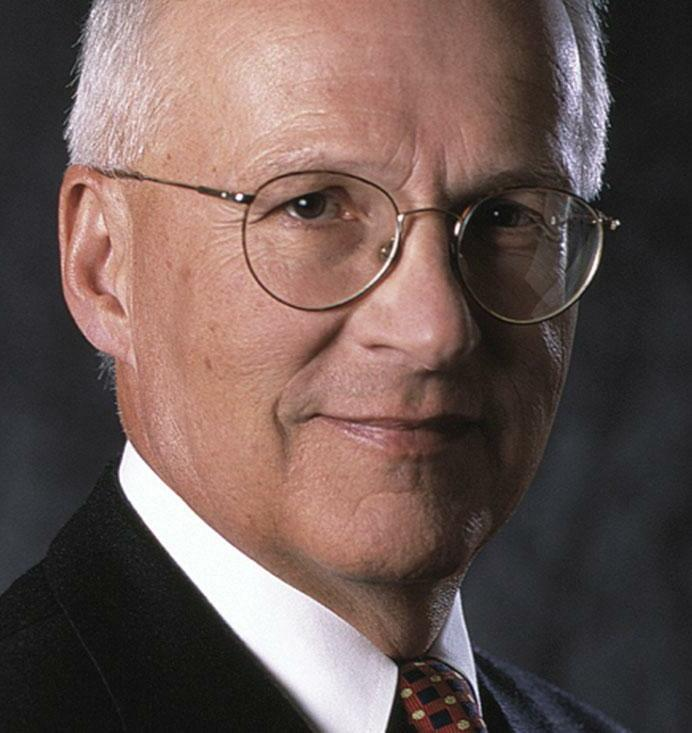

Senior Judge of the United States Court of Appeals for the Second Circuit
- Incumbent
- Assumed office August 1, 2016

Judge of the United States Court of Appeals for the Second Circuit
- In office June 12, 2003 – August 1, 2016
- Appointed by: George W. Bush
- Preceded by: Pierre N. Leval
- Succeeded by: Richard J. Sullivan

Associate Judge of the New York Court of Appeals
- In office January 3, 1997 – June 12, 2003
- Appointed by: George Pataki
- Preceded by: Richard D. Simons
- Succeeded by: Robert S. Smith

Member of the New York State Assembly from the 136th district
- In office January 1, 1983 – December 31, 1986
- Preceded by: James L. Emery
- Succeeded by: John Hasper

Personal details
- Born: Richard Carl Wesley; August 1, 1949 (age 77) Canandaigua, New York, U.S.
- Party: Republican
- Education: State University of New York, Albany (BA); Cornell University (JD)

Richard Carl Wesley (born August 1, 1949) is a senior United States circuit judge of the United States Court of Appeals for the Second Circuit. He previously served on every level of New York's judiciary—including six years on the state's highest court—and represented New York's 136th District in the state legislature.

== Early life and education ==
Wesley was raised in the hamlet of Hemlock, New York, where his father drove a fuel-oil delivery truck and mother worked first as a butcher and later a nurse. He earned a B.A. summa cum laude in American History from the University at Albany, SUNY, where he played on the university’s inaugural football squad and served in student government. He received his J.D. from Cornell Law School in 1974 and was an editor of the Cornell Law Review.

== Early legal and political career ==
=== Law practice ===
Wesley began his legal career with Harris Beach in Rochester. He then returned to Geneseo as an associate at Welch, Streb & Porter, a Livingston County firm where he became partner in 1977. During this period he also served as secretary of the Livingston County Bar Association and as a member of the Seventh Judicial District Grievance Committee.

=== Legislative aide and Assemblyman ===
From 1979 to 1982, Wesley served as assistant counsel and chief legislative aide to New York Assembly Minority Leader James L. Emery.

In 1982, Wesley was elected as a Republican to represent New York's 136th State Assembly district, succeeding Emery. He was reelected without opposition in 1984. In the Assembly, Wesley served on the Codes Committee and the Environmental Conservation Committee. He sponsored legislation establishing procedures for taking blood samples from intoxicated drivers, removing an evidentiary obstacle that had prevented prosecutors from convicting child molesters, and streamlining settlement procedures on behalf of infants. In 1985, the Livingston-Wyoming Association of Retarded Citizens named him Legislator of the Year.

While in Albany, Wesley shared an apartment with fellow Republican Assemblymen Bill Paxon (later a U.S. Congressman) and Michael F. Nozzolio (later a State Senator). During his second term the freshman Assemblyman from Peekskill—George Pataki, who would later become Governor and nominate Wesley to the New York Court of Appeals—occasionally stayed with the group as well.

== State judicial service ==
=== New York Supreme Court ===
Wesley's judicial career began with his election to the New York Supreme Court in 1986. He served as a trial judge in Rochester from 1987 to 1994. In 1988 he established a Trial Assistance Part to address a growing backlog of cases in Monroe County, and subsequently created the county's felony-screening program, which reduced processing delays by more than 60 percent and was later adopted statewide as a model for other judicial districts.

=== Appellate Division and Court of Appeals ===
Democratic Governor Mario Cuomo appointed Wesley to the Appellate Division, Fourth Department in 1994. On December 3, 1996, Republican Governor George Pataki nominated him to the New York Court of Appeals, calling the choice his "most important judicial nomination." The New York Times profiled Wesley as "a justice rooted in small-town life and values." The New York State Senate unanimously confirmed him on January 14, 1997.

Wesley served on the Court of Appeals from 1997 until his federal confirmation in 2003. Initially the only Republican-appointed judge on the bench, he emerged as a consensus builder; Chief Judge Judith Kaye called him an "outstanding jurist, sound administrator, valued colleague," and former colleague Judge Joseph W. Bellacosa described him as "intellectually curious and open to fresh ideas" with a "tireless" work ethic. Senator Chuck Schumer later said Wesley had become "best known for [a] thoughtful, scholarly approach that united judges behind unanimous opinions."

== Federal judicial service ==
On March 5, 2003, President George W. Bush nominated Wesley to the United States Court of Appeals for the Second Circuit to fill the seat vacated by Judge Pierre N. Leval, who had assumed senior status. Both of New York's Democratic senators championed the nomination: Senator Hillary Clinton called Wesley a "superb jurist" who "sought to improve the quality of justice and the lives of the people who appeared before him," and Senator Chuck Schumer described him as having "a top-flight legal mind" and someone who "has made an excellent judge in New York State." The nomination was also supported by Congressman Tom Reynolds and former Congressman Bill Paxon, Wesley's onetime Albany roommate. The United States Senate approved the nomination on June 11, 2003, by a vote of 96–0. He received his commission on June 12, 2003, and was sworn in on July 21, 2003.

Wesley has on occasion sat by designation in the Western District of New York.

== Judicial philosophy ==
Wesley has described himself as “conservative in nature, pragmatic at the same time, with a fair appreciation of judicial restraint,” adding that “I ... have always restricted myself to what I understand to be the plain language of the statute. ... As long as the language is plain, we should restrict ourselves.” He aims to write opinions that satisfy what he calls the “Livonia Post Office test”—that is, they are understandable to his neighbors back home.

== Notable decisions ==
- In re Grand Jury Subpoena Duces Tecum Served on the Museum of Modern Art, 93 N.Y.2d 729 (1999) (quashing a subpoena for provenance records in a Nazi-looted-art investigation).
- Hamilton v. Beretta U.S.A. Corp., 96 N.Y.2d 222 (2001) (declining to impose a common-law duty on handgun manufacturers to the general public).
- Padilla v. Rumsfeld, 352 F.3d 695 (2d Cir. 2003) (Wesley, J., dissenting) (arguing that a U.S. citizen detained as an enemy combatant was entitled to counsel and judicial review).
- United States v. Am. Express Co., 838 F.3d 179 (2d Cir. 2016) (holding AmEx’s anti‑steering rules did not violate Sherman Act § 1), aff’d sub nom. Ohio v. Am. Express Co., 585 U.S. 529 (2018).
- United States v. Silver, 948 F.3d 538 (2d Cir. 2020) (affirming corruption and money‑laundering convictions of former New York State Assembly Speaker Sheldon Silver), cert. denied, 141 S. Ct. 656 (2021).
- In re Purdue Pharma L.P., 69 F.4th 45 (2d Cir. 2023) (Wesley, J., concurring) (urging the Supreme Court or Congress to clarify bankruptcy courts’ power to approve non-consensual third-party releases).

== Selected publications ==
- Note, Developments in Welfare Law—1973, 59 Cornell L. Rev. 859 (1974).
- New York’s Court of Appeals: A Personal Perspective, 48 Syracuse L. Rev. 1461 (1998).
- Hugh Jones and Modern Courts: The Pursuit of Justice Then and Now, 65 Alb. L. Rev. 1123 (2002).
- When Law and Medicine Collide, 12 Cornell J.L. & Pub. Pol’y 261 (2003).
- If Legislators Fail, Who Is There to Follow?, 68 Alb. L. Rev. 703 (2005).
- A Tribute to Hon. George Bundy Smith: A Friend and Colleague, 34 Fordham Urb. L.J. 1156 (2007).
- A Portrait of Judith S. Kaye, 84 N.Y.U. L. Rev. 676 (2009).
- Being Like Boehm: David Boehm, Judicature, Feb. 2014.
- Feinberg Redux—An Inside Look at the Second Circuit, in The Judges of the Second Circuit, at v (Cornell Law Review, ed., 2016).
- New York Law in Federal Court: A Brief Word on Certification, N.Y. St. B.J., May 2020, at 20.

== Personal life ==
A lifelong athlete, Wesley completed the Wineglass Marathon in 3h 52m and the Chicago Marathon in 3h 39m. For seven years, he pulled overnight shifts as a driver with the Livonia Volunteer Ambulance & Fire Department, often negotiating blizzards and dense Finger-Lakes fog to ferry patients to area hospitals. He continues to serve on the Myers Fund (a local children's charity), the United Church of Livonia’s board of trustees, and advisory councils at Cornell Law School and Cornell University.

Legal offices
Preceded by Richard D. Simons	Associate Judge of the New York Court of Appeals; 1997–2003	Succeeded by Robert S. Smith
Preceded by Pierre N. Leval	Judge of the United States Court of Appeals for the Second Circuit; 2003–2016	Succeeded by Richard J. Sullivan
