= Robert S. Smith =

American judge

Associate Judge of the New York Court of Appeals
- In office January 12, 2004 – December 31, 2014
- Appointed by: George Pataki
- Preceded by: Richard C. Wesley
- Succeeded by: Eugene M. Fahey

Personal details
- Born: Robert Sherlock Smith; August 31, 1944 (age 82) New York City, New York, U.S.
- Education: Stanford University (BA); Columbia University (LLB)

Robert Sherlock Smith (born August 31, 1944) is a former Associate Judge of the New York Court of Appeals. Smith retired on December 31, 2014, as the State Constitution's requirement that judges retire at the end of the calendar year in which they reached the age of 70.

== Early life and education ==
Smith was born in New York City in 1944, and grew up in Massachusetts and Connecticut. He graduated from Stanford University in 1965 and from Columbia Law School in 1968, where he was editor-in-chief of the Columbia Law Review.

== Pre-judicial career ==
From 1968 to 2003 he practiced law in New York City with the firm of Paul, Weiss, Rifkind, Wharton & Garrison, taking a one-year leave of absence in 1980–81 to serve as Visiting Professor from Practice at Columbia Law School.

In private practice, Smith was best known for representing a shopping center in a case, Shad Alliance v. Smith Haven Mall, that established that the right of free speech does not require shopping centers to allow people to hand out literature on their property; for representing United Airlines' pilots' union in its attempt to take over United Airlines; and for arguing two death penalty appeals before the United States Supreme Court.

== Court of Appeals ==
On November 4, 2003, he was appointed by Governor George Pataki to the Court of Appeals. During his first year, he emerged as the court's most vigorous questioner from the bench.

In October 2011, Smith gave the keynote address at the Seventh Annual Friedrich A. von Hayek Lecture, "The Hayekian Judge," sponsored by New York University Journal of Law and Liberty. He was introduced by Richard Epstein.

Judge Smith teaches a class at the Benjamin N. Cardozo School of Law with former dean David Rudenstine on the subject of President Trump and the constitutional order.

=== Notable opinions ===
- He wrote a plurality opinion in Pataki v. Silver, upholding the Governor's power over the state budget.
- He wrote a dissent in People v. LaValle, in which the majority ruled that the death penalty was unconstitutional.
- On July 6, 2006, Smith wrote the main opinion in Hernandez v. Robles, a 4-2 decision, declaring that same-sex marriage in New York was not constitutionally required, and was to be left to the legislature. Chief Judge Judith Kaye wrote the dissent.
- On October 23, 2007, in People v. Taylor, he sided with the majority in upholding People v. LaValle, on the grounds of stare decisis.

== Post-judicial career ==
Smith became a partner in New York City law firm Friedman Kaplan Seiler & Adelman LLP on January 1, 2015, one day after retiring from the Court of Appeals.

== Personal ==
Smith is married to Dian Goldston Smith. His sons are journalist Ben Smith and educator Emlen Smith, and his daughter is lawyer Rosemary Szanyi. Smith is a Christian while his wife is Jewish.

Legal offices
Preceded by Richard C. Wesley	Associate Judge of the New York Court of Appeals; 2004–2014	Succeeded by Eugene M. Fahey
