= Jenny Rivera =

Jenny Rivera may refer to:

- Jenni Rivera (1969–2012), Mexican-American singer-songwriter, actress, television producer and entrepreneur
- Jenny Rivera (judge) (born 1960), judge on the New York State Court of Appeals
