= Brooklyn Jewish Hospital and Medical Center =

Geography
- Location: 555 Prospect Place, Brooklyn, New York, United States
- Coordinates: 40°40′32″N 73°57′30″W

Services
- Beds: 886 beds

History
- Founded: 1906
- Closed: 1983

Links
- Lists: Hospitals in New York State

The Brooklyn Jewish Hospital and Medical Center was an academic, sectarian hospital in Crown Heights and Prospect Heights in Central Brooklyn. It merged with St. John's Episcopal Hospital to form Interfaith Medical Center in 1983.

== History ==
=== Early days ===
The hospital's predecessor was the Brooklyn Hebrew Hospital Society, which formed in 1895 as a clinic; they served as a small dispensary and were located at 70 Johnson Street that grew to serve the burgeoning populations of Crown Heights and Prospect Heights.

In the early 20th century, many Jewish communities saw both benefit and need in developing modern hospital facilities. By 1901, local community leaders saw the need to expand the Society to a 50-bed hospital. They incorporated as Jewish Hospital of Brooklyn on November 9, 1901, and by 1903, had purchased an older hospital campus, the Memorial Hospital for Women and Children, to renovate and reopen. It was located on the block of Classon Avenue, between Prospect Place and St. Marks Avenue. Shortly after its purchase, the trustees decided that the community could support a much larger facility and spent several years fundraising, insisting that work not start until money was in hand to cover all the work. This combination of expansive plans and fiscal conservatism delayed the opening by several years. In 1906, as fundraising and construction continued, additional property was purchased along St Marks Avenue, and later that year, an additional adjacent tract was acquired. The additional space was used for a nursing school and dormitory, and administrative offices. On December 9, 1906, the society dedicated the Jewish Hospital of Brooklyn (555 Prospect Place); the hospital opened to patients on December 17, 1906. The nursing school had opened earlier in the month, on December 4.

=== 1920–1950 ===
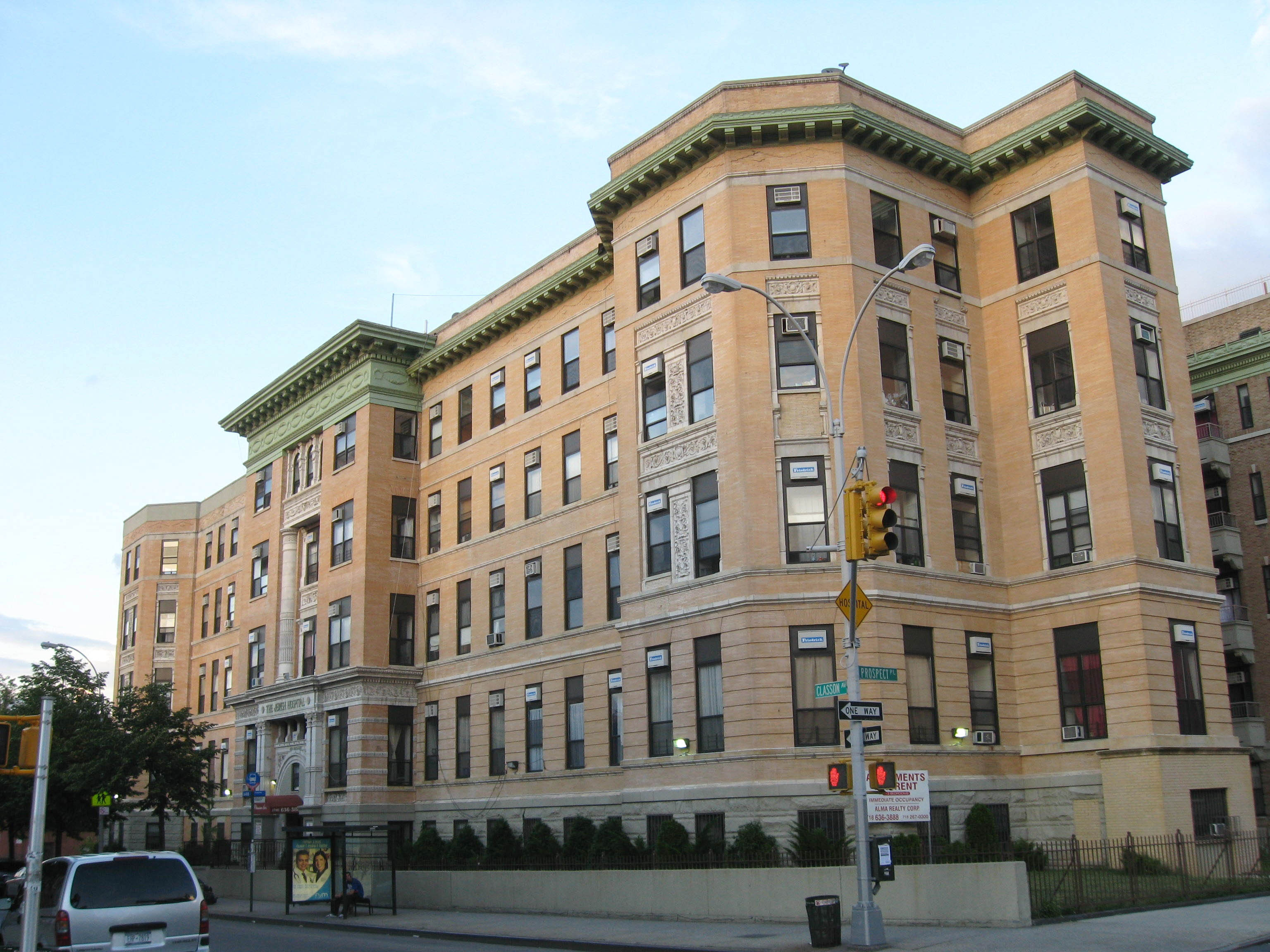
Jewish Hospital of Brooklyn

In the 1920s, Nathan Jonas donated additional land to the hospital for a park, but it was later used to build a new wing, which opened in 1928, giving the hospital a 650-bed capacity. Jonas, a founder of the hospital, raised much of its funding from Abraham Abraham, a founder of the Abraham & Straus department store.

In the 1930s, the hospital's president, Joseph Baker, was also the chair of the nearby Long Island College Hospital.

In December 1948, Dr. Rudolph Nissen, a hospital surgeon, famous for developing a widely used operation to prevent esophageal reflux, performed an exploratory laparotomy on Albert Einstein at the hospital.

=== 1950–1980 ===
By the 1950s, it had grown to be one of the largest and best hospital complexes in Brooklyn. In addition to the main building, which faced Classon Avenue, the hospital had a nursing school and residence (built in 1927) and several adjoining pavilions, wings and clinics, the last of which seem to date from the 1950s. They renamed to Jewish Hospital and Medical Center of Brooklyn by 1968.

=== Merged ===
While the hospital thrived for more than 50 years after its opening and continued to expand further along and across Prospect Place, it ran into financial trouble as the neighborhood suffered from municipal disinvestment and white flight. Short on money, the physical plant and equipment was neglected. Jewish Hospital was forced into bankruptcy, reorganized, and on December 16, 1982 merged with St. John's, another struggling hospital. The new name was Interfaith Medical Center. Each site, situated "11 blocks apart" from one another, remained open.

After the merger, which resulted in "one of Brooklyn's largest teaching hospitals," most of the campus, including the original main building along Classon Avenue, was sold off and converted to apartment buildings. The masonry facade on Classon still bears the name of the hospital. A building on Prospect Place continued to serve as an outpatient clinic of the surviving organization. The elimination of the legacy Jewish Hospital after the merger has been cited as an example of the issues facing mergers of struggling partner hospitals and of the difficulties of merging dissimilar sectarian cultures.

The Prospect Place site became an apartment building. 1545 Atlantic Avenue is still “Interfaith Medical Center”.

== See also ==
- List of hospitals in Brooklyn
