= Friends of Thayer Lake, LLC v. Brown =

New York state legal precedent

Friends of Thayer Lake LLC v. Brown
- Court: New York Court of Appeals
- Argued: March 24, 2016
- Decided: May 10, 2016
- Citations: 27 N.Y.3d 1039; 53 N.E.3d 730; 33 N.Y.S.3d 853

Case history
- Prior history: 126 A.D.3d 22, 1 N.Y.S.3d 504 (2015)

Court membership
- Chief judge: Janet DiFiore
- Associate judges: Eugene F. Pigott Jr., Jenny Rivera, Sheila Abdus-Salaam, Leslie Stein, Eugene M. Fahey, Michael J. Garcia

Keywords
- Navigability; navigable-in-fact; Summary judgment

Friends of Thayer Lake, LLC v. Brown is a New York State court case addressing whether certain waterways in the Adirondack Park are navigable-in-fact under common law and therefore open to public use. The courts ultimately ruled in favor of the landowners, holding that the waterways at issue were private and not subject to public navigation rights.

== Background ==
The dispute arose after a 2009 article titled “Testing the Legal Waters” described a journalist paddling approximately 1.89 miles of waterways—Mud Pond Outlet and Shingle Shanty Brook—and using a trail on private land rather than a shorter carry route on nearby state-owned property.

In September 2010, the New York State Department of Environmental Conservation (DEC) issued a letter stating that the waterways were open to public navigation. Landowners associated with Friends of Thayer Lake, LLC subsequently filed suit seeking a declaration that the waterways were private property and not public highways under New York common law.

== Procedural history ==
The State of New York intervened in the litigation in support of public navigation rights.

The case ultimately reached the New York Court of Appeals, the highest court in New York State. In 2016, the court declined to resolve the navigability question on the existing record and remitted the case to the trial court for fact-finding.

The Court of Appeals held that the record was inconclusive as to factors relevant to navigability-in-fact, including historical and prospective commercial utility, public accessibility, ease of passage by canoe, and the volume of historical and anticipated use.

== Trial court decision ==
After a 14-day bench trial conducted in August and September 2018, the New York Supreme Court issued a decision on December 20, 2018, in favor of the landowners.

The court found that while the waterways could be traversed by canoes and kayaks, with some portaging required, recreational use alone was insufficient to establish navigability-in-fact. The court concluded that Mud Pond Outlet and Shingle Shanty Brook were private and not subject to public navigation rights.

== Aftermath ==
Neither the State of New York nor the individual paddler appealed the 2018 decision. As a result, the ruling stands, and public paddling on the waterways at issue is prohibited.

== Legal significance ==
Friends of Thayer Lake, LLC v. Brown is frequently cited in New York case law for clarifying the evidentiary standards governing common-law navigability and the limits of summary judgment in fact-intensive disputes. In its 2016 decision, the New York Court of Appeals emphasized that recreational use alone is not determinative of navigability-in-fact and that courts must evaluate historical and prospective commercial utility, public accessibility, ease of passage, and the volume of past and anticipated use.

The 2018 trial court decision further reinforced the distinction under New York law between recreational usability and legal navigability, holding that the ability to traverse a waterway by canoe or kayak does not by itself establish a public right of navigation. The case is commonly referenced in discussions of Adirondack water access and property rights as illustrating the limits of common-law navigation rights absent evidence of commercial utility.
