= Interfaith Medical Center =

- One Brooklyn Health
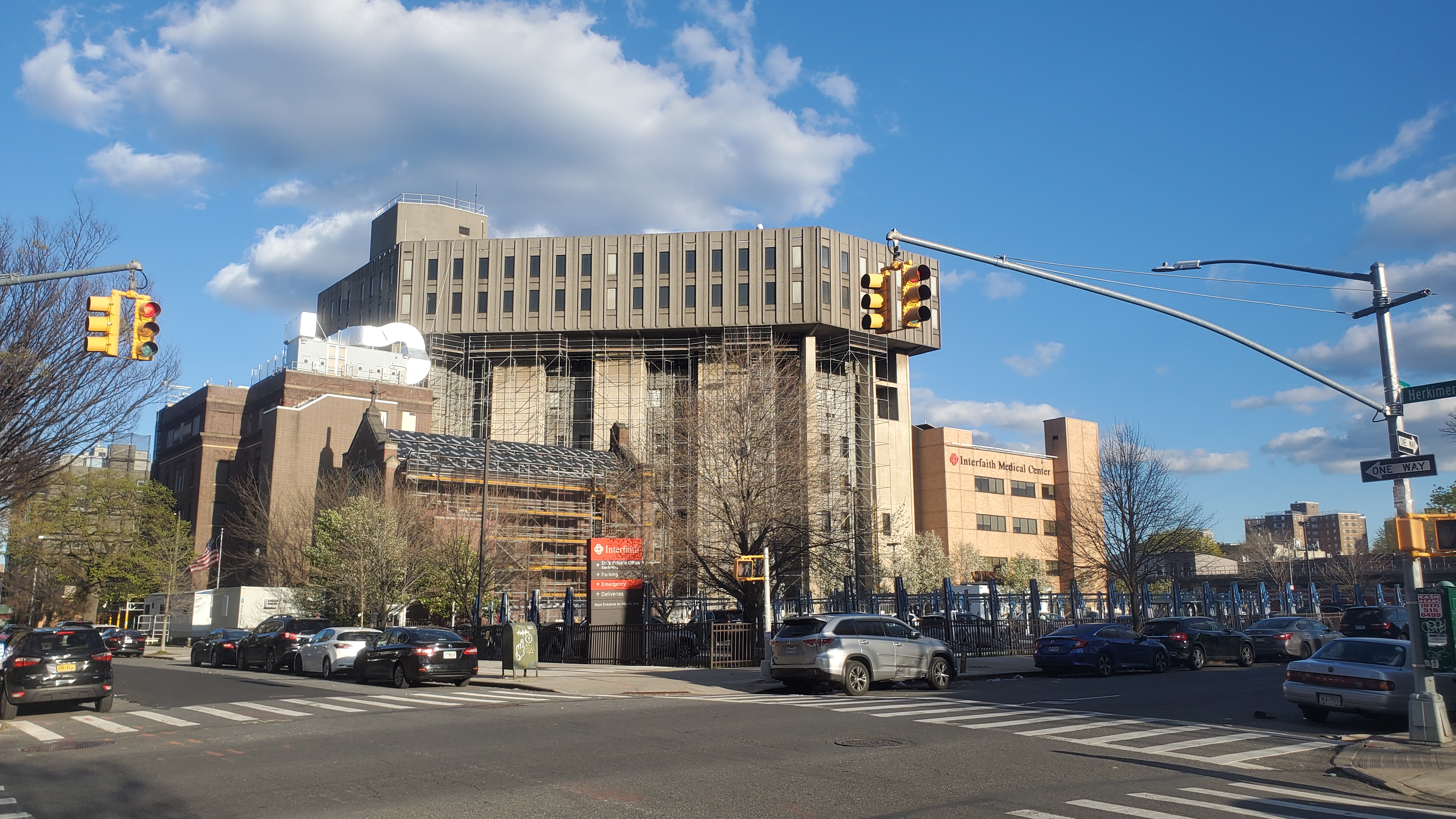

- Central Brooklyn, New York

Geography
- Location: 1545 Atlantic Avenue Brooklyn, New York 11216, Brooklyn, New York, United States
- Coordinates: 40.6784°N 73.9378°W

Organization
- Type: Community, Teaching

Services
- Emergency department: Yes
- Beds: 287

History
- Founded: 1845

Links
- Website: www.interfaithmedical.org
- Lists: Hospitals in New York State
- Other links: Hospitals in Brooklyn

Interfaith Medical Center is a hospital located in Brooklyn, New York. With facilities in Crown Heights, Bedford-Stuyvesant, and Prospect Heights, it is a full-service non-profit community hospital that has 287 beds and serves more than 11,000 inpatients each year. It also has more than 200,000 outpatient visits and services and 50,000 emergency department visits annually.

Interfaith is also a teaching hospital, with four graduate medical education residency programs, and fellowship programs in Pulmonary Medicine, Cardiology and Gastroenterology. Interfaith continues to serve as a safety-net hospital for its surrounding community since it emerged from bankruptcy in 2014. It joined One Brooklyn Health system upon its creation in 2016 along with Brookdale University Hospital and Kingsbrook Jewish Medical Center.

In addition to its main campus at 1545 Atlantic Avenue, Interfaith has other buildings which house specialists who provide care and offer community education and physician referrals to several other areas in Central Brooklyn. The largest is the Bishop Orris G. Walker, Jr. Healthcare Center, located at 528 Prospect Place and serving Prospect Heights and Crown Heights. The Bishop Orris G. Walker Center houses most outpatient specialties along with an internal medicine clinic and Atlantic Urgent Care.

== History ==
Interfaith Medical Center was formed on December 31, 1982, with the merger of two large, previously independent hospitals, the Brooklyn Jewish Hospital and Medical Center in Crown Heights and St. John's Episcopal Hospital in Bedford-Stuyvesant.

=== St. John's Episcopal Hospital ===
The official date for the dedication and incorporation of the St. John's Episcopal Hospital are unknown. The best documentation dates St. John's Episcopal Hospital's services to the mid-19th century. The Episcopal Diocese of Long Island established the St. John's Episcopal Home for the Aged and the Blind on Herkimer Street in the Bedford-Stuyvesant section of Brooklyn.

=== Jewish Hospital of Brooklyn and Medical Center ===
The Jewish Hospital of Brooklyn opened as a small dispensary at 70 Johnson Street in 1895. Originally the Jewish Hospital Society of Brooklyn, the dispensary grew to serve the burgeoning populations of Crown Heights and Prospect Heights. On December 9, 1906, the society dedicated the Jewish Hospital of Brooklyn.

By the 1950s, it had grown to be one of the largest and best hospital complexes in Brooklyn. In addition to the main building, which faced Classon Avenue, the hospital had a nursing school and residence (built in 1927) and several adjoining pavilions, wings and clinics, the last of which seem to date from the 1950s. In December 1948, Dr. Rudolph Nissen, a hospital surgeon, famous for developing a widely used operation to prevent esophageal reflux, performed an exploratory laparotomy on Albert Einstein at the hospital.

=== Merger ===
St. John's Episcopal and Brooklyn Jewish Hospital both grew during the first half of the 20th century. At the heights of their successes, they were the largest employers in Central Brooklyn. However, after World War II, the population of the neighborhood began to change. The affluent residents began to decamp to the suburbs and were replaced by a less wealthy population. The patients in the area began to become more reliant on Medicare and Medicaid, and these government programs paid less than private health insurers. As a result, the both hospitals became increasingly financially unstable.

Brooklyn Jewish Hospital declared bankruptcy in 1979. It received federal protection, was able to reorganize, and its operations continued until 1982.

Although St. John's did not declare bankruptcy, its finances nevertheless became increasingly precarious. To save the two hospitals, a merger was completed in December 1982. The combined entity was called Interfaith Medical Center.

After the merger, Interfaith continued to struggle financially. In 1985, its medical residents went on a two-week strike over disputed wages and long hours of work.

== Facilities ==
=== Behavioral Health Services ===
Offerings in behavioral health are a mainstay of Interfaith's medical services. The medical center provides a wide array of outpatient, inpatient and emergency behavioral health, psychiatric, detoxification, and drug rehabilitation programs. The hospital also assists patients in entering housing and outpatient chemical dependency programs.

=== Bishop Orris G. Walker Jr. Health Care Center ===
This center provides numerous outpatient services. The facility consists of 34 outpatient clinics in general medicine and a wide range of other specialties and subspecialties.

=== AIDS Treatment Center ===
Interfaith provides federally supported care and treatment services in their AIDS Treatment Center.

== Hospital rating data ==
The HealthGrades website contains the clinical quality data for Interfaith Medical Center, as of 2017. For this rating section, three different types of data from HealthGrades are presented: clinical quality ratings for thirteen inpatient conditions and procedures, twelve patient safety indicators and the percentage of patients giving the hospital as a 9 or 10 (the two highest possible ratings).

For inpatient conditions and procedures, there are three possible ratings: worse than expected, as expected, better than expected. For this hospital the data for this category is:

- Worse than expected – 7
- As expected – 5
- Better than expected – 1

For patient safety indicators, there are the same three possible ratings. For this hospital safety indicators were rated as:

- Worse than expected – 4
- As expected – 7
- Better than expected – 1

Percentage of patients rating this hospital as a 9 or 10 – 52% Percentage of patients who on average rank hospitals as a 9 or 10 – 69%
