= St. John's Episcopal Hospital =

Defunct sectarian hospital in the Bedford-Stuyvesant neighborhood of Central Brooklyn

Geography
- Location: 1545 Atlantic Avenue, Brooklyn, New York, United States
- Coordinates: 40°40′42″N 73°56′15″W

History
- Opened: 1871
- Closed: 1982

Links
- Lists: Hospitals in New York State

St. John's Episcopal Hospital was founded in 1871 as an American sectarian hospital. It was later known as St. John's Hospital of Brooklyn, 1545 Atlantic Avenue, in the Bedford-Stuyvesant neighborhood of Central Brooklyn, New York, and became a major teaching affiliate of the SUNY Downstate College of Medicine.

After severe financial difficulties in the early to mid-1970s because of construction of a new addition being completed in 1972, St. John's (the original hospital building along with the new addition) closed on October 20, 1975 and both buildings became vacant and closed until December 31, 1982. On December 31, 1982, it merged with the larger Brooklyn Jewish Hospital and Medical Center (this hospital building closed to be converted into apartments in the 2000s), forming Interfaith Medical Center (reopening the original hospital building along with the addition).
