= Sol Wachtler =

American judge

Chief Judge of the New York Court of Appeals
- In office January 2, 1985 – November 10, 1992
- Appointed by: Mario Cuomo
- Preceded by: Lawrence H. Cooke
- Succeeded by: Richard D. Simons (acting); Judith S. Kaye

Associate Judge of the New York Court of Appeals
- In office 1973–1985

Justice of the New York Supreme Court
- In office 1968–1972
- Appointed by: Nelson Rockefeller

Personal details
- Born: Solomon Wachtler; April 29, 1930 (age 96) Brooklyn, New York, U.S.
- Party: Republican
- Spouse: Joan Wolosoff (m. 1952; died 2022)
- Children: 4
- Education: Washington and Lee University (BA, LL.B.)
- Occupation: Attorney, judge

Solomon "Sol" Wachtler (born April 29, 1930) is an American former jurist, Republican politician, attorney, and author from the state of New York. He served as Chief Judge of the New York Court of Appeals from 1985 to 1992. Shortly after his appointment as Chief Judge, Wachtler said that district attorneys could get grand juries to "indict a ham sandwich", which has been widely repeated.

A graduate of Washington and Lee University, Wachtler served as a councilman and then a town supervisor of the Town of North Hempstead, New York. In 1968, he was appointed as a state trial court judge. Four years later, Wachtler was elected to the New York Court of Appeals, where he served for nearly 20 years and authored nearly 400 opinions. Governor Mario Cuomo appointed him to the position of chief judge of the Court of Appeals in 1985.

In 1992, Wachtler was charged with various crimes stemming from threats he made to a former lover, Joy Silverman, and her daughter. After resigning his judgeship, Wachtler pleaded guilty to the charges and served 13 months in prison and a halfway house. After his release, he became an author, critic, and advocate for the mentally ill.

== Early life and education ==
Wachtler was born in the Brooklyn borough of New York City on April 29, 1930. He was mostly raised in the South because his father, Phillip, was a traveling salesman. His mother, Fay, was an immigrant from Russia. Wachtler is Jewish.

Wachtler graduated with both a B.A. and an LL.B. from Washington and Lee University. He served in the United States Army before moving to Great Neck on Long Island, near his wife's family, where he worked as an attorney.

== Career ==
Wachtler began his political career in 1963, when he was first elected to be a councilman and then a town supervisor of North Hempstead, New York. In 1968, after a failed bid for Nassau County executive, he was appointed to the New York Supreme Court by Governor Nelson Rockefeller. In 1972, he was elected to the New York Court of Appeals, where he served nearly 20 years and authored close to 400 opinions. On January 2, 1985, Governor Mario Cuomo appointed him Chief Judge of the Court of Appeals.

The same month as his appointment, The New York Daily News quoted Wachtler as saying that "district attorneys now have so much influence on grand juries that 'by and large' they could get them to 'indict a ham sandwich.'" In his 1987 novel The Bonfire of the Vanities, Tom Wolfe, citing Wachtler, paraphrased this as "a grand jury would 'indict a ham sandwich', if that's what you wanted." The phrase remains in common usage in legal discussions.

Wachtler's 1975 decision in Chapadeau v. Utica Observer protected the right of the defendant newspaper (and by extension of the press in general) to cover issues of public concern without undue exposure to suits for libel. The reasoning in the decision influenced courts throughout the U.S.

Wachtler was a key figure in making marital rape a criminal offense, writing in People v. Liberta, "A marriage license should not be viewed as a license for a husband to forcibly rape his wife with impunity".

Wachtler wrote the majority opinion in a 1988 right to die case interpreting the statute's requirement of "clear and convincing evidence" that a person who can no longer communicate would want to die in a particular circumstance. The majority opinion set a stricter standard of "clear and convincing" than the lower courts, and refused to let a patient's family withdraw life support. General statements by a person that he or she would not want to live in such a condition are not sufficient under the decision. Right-to-die organizations criticized the decision, saying it was too strict, unworkable, and took decision-making away from family members. Wachtler was criticized for writing the decision while his own mother was recovering from a stroke. The Supreme Court of the United States later adopted his formulation of this higher standard of proof.

As Chief Judge, Wachtler served not only as the head of the Court of Appeals, but also as the chief administrator for the state court system. He made significant administrative changes, called for the merit selection of judges, implemented streamlined procedures, reduced opportunities for forum shopping, and reformed the state's grand jury system. Wachtler also created a New York State Judicial Commission for Minority Concerns, a Workforce Diversity Program, and a New York State Task Force on Gender Bias.

== Criminal charges and resignation ==
In 1988, Wachtler began an extramarital affair with Joy Silverman. Wachtler was a co-executor of the estate of Alvin Wolosoff, Silverman's stepfather and the uncle of Wachtler's wife. He was also trustee of trusts that benefited Silverman and her family. United States Attorney Michael Chertoff indicated that Wachtler received fees amounting to over $800,000 for his work as executor and trustee of the Wolosoff estate. After Silverman ended their affair in September 1991, Wachtler began harassing her.

On November 7, 1992, Wachtler was arrested on charges including extortion, racketeering, and blackmail. Prosecutors alleged that he demanded $20,000 in exchange for turning over compromising photographs and tapes of Silverman with her then-boyfriend, attorney David Samson. After being released without bail, Wachtler resigned his judgeship on November 10. On March 30, 1993, Wachtler pleaded guilty to harassing Silverman and threatening to kidnap her daughter. On September 9, 1993, he was sentenced to 15 months in prison.

On September 28, 1993, Wachtler began serving his sentence at the medium-security Federal Correctional Complex in Butner, North Carolina. Beginning in December 1993, he was incarcerated at the Federal Medical Center in Rochester, Minnesota, after having been stabbed in the shoulder while dozing in his cell in November. Wachtler also served some of his sentence at a halfway house. He received time off for good behavior and was released after serving 13 months.

== Later life ==
After his release from prison, Wachtler wrote a memoir, After the Madness (ISBN 0-7592-4519-3) and a book of fiction, Blood Brothers (ISBN 1-59007-421-1). He also contributed to the book Serving Mentally Ill Defendants (ISBN 0-8261-1504-7) and has written as a critic-at-large for The New Yorker. He has worked as an adjunct professor at Touro Law Center and Chair of the Law and Psychiatry Institute of North Shore Long Island Jewish Hospital. He is an advocate for the mentally ill and has received awards from the Mental Health Association of the State of New York and New York City. Wachtler's New York law license was restored by the New York Supreme Court, Appellate Division on October 2, 2007.

== Personal life ==
Wachtler has reportedly been diagnosed with bipolar disorder. He has attributed his criminal behavior to his mental health difficulties.

In 1952, Wachtler married his high school sweetheart, Joan Carol Wolosoff, the daughter of homebuilder Leon Wolosoff, granddaughter of lumberman Max Blumberg, and niece of New York State Senator George Blumberg. They had four children: attorney Lauren Wachtler Montclare; Marjorie Wachtler Eagan, a docent at the Metropolitan Museum of Art; actress and model Alison Wachtler Braunstein; and real estate developer Philip Wachtler. His daughter Lauren married attorney Paul Douglas Montclare in 1983. Philip Wachtler is married to Robin Wilpon, daughter of former New York Mets owner Fred Wilpon. Joan Wachtler died on August 21, 2022, aged 91.
