= John W. Hasper =

American politician (1935–2020)

Member of the New York State Assembly from the 136th district
- In office January 1, 1987 – December 31, 1992
- Preceded by: Richard C. Wesley
- Succeeded by: Jerry Johnson

Personal details
- Born: November 6, 1935 Albany, New York
- Died: January 4, 2020 (aged 84) Punta Gorda, Florida
- Party: Republican

John W. Hasper (November 6, 1935 – January 4, 2020) was an American politician who served in the New York State Assembly from the 136th district from 1987 to 1992.

He died on January 4, 2020, in Punta Gorda, Florida at age 84.
