= Jacob J. Schwartzwald =

American politician and judge (1900–1983)

Member of the New York State Senate from the 6th District
- In office 1935–1942
- Preceded by: George Blumberg
- Succeeded by: Louis B. Heller

Member of the New York State Assembly from Kings County's 6th District
- In office 1927–1933
- Preceded by: George Blumberg
- Succeeded by: Samson Inselbuch

Justice of the New York Supreme Court
- In office 1955–1976

Judge of the New York City Court
- Incumbent
- Assumed office 1955

Judge of the New York City Court
- In office 1942–1954
- Preceded by: Edward J. Kelly

Personal details
- Born: March 12, 1900 Williamsburg, Brooklyn, New York, U.S.
- Died: October 8, 1983 (aged 83) Brooklyn, New York, U.S.
- Party: Democratic
- Education: Brooklyn Law School
- Occupation: Lawyer, judge

Jacob J. Schwartzwald (March 12, 1900 – October 8, 1983) was an American lawyer, politician, and judge from New York. He served in both houses of the New York State Legislature and later as a justice of the New York Supreme Court.

== Life ==
He was born on March 12, 1900, in Williamsburg, Brooklyn. He graduated from Brooklyn Law School, and practiced law in New York City.

=== State legislature ===
Schwartzwald was a member of the New York State Assembly (Kings Co., 6th D.) in 1927, 1928, 1929, 1930, 1931, 1932 and 1933.

He was a member of the New York State Senate (6th D.) from 1935 to 1942, sitting in the 158th, 159th, 160th, 161st, 162nd and 163rd New York State Legislatures.

=== Judicial career ===
On September 9, 1942, he was appointed by Gov. Herbert H. Lehman to the City Court, to fill the vacancy caused by the death of Edward J. Kelly. In November 1942, he was elected to a full ten-year term, and was re-elected in November 1952.

On November 2, 1954, he was elected to the New York Supreme Court for a 14-year term beginning on January 1, 1955. On November 20, 1954, six weeks before his term would begin, he was appointed by Gov. Thomas E. Dewey to the Supreme Court, to fill a vacancy. He was re-elected in November 1968, became an Official Referee (i.e. a senior judge on an additional seat) of the Supreme Court in 1971, and retired from the bench at the end of 1976 when he reached the constitutional age limit.

=== Death ===
He died on October 8, 1983, in Interfaith Hospital in Brooklyn. He was Jewish.

New York State Assembly
Preceded by George Blumberg	New York State Assembly; Kings County, 6th District; 1927–1933	Succeeded by Samson Inselbuch
New York State Senate
Preceded by George Blumberg	New York State Senate; 6th District; 1935–1942	Succeeded by Louis B. Heller
