= Max Blumberg =

American businessman and philanthropist

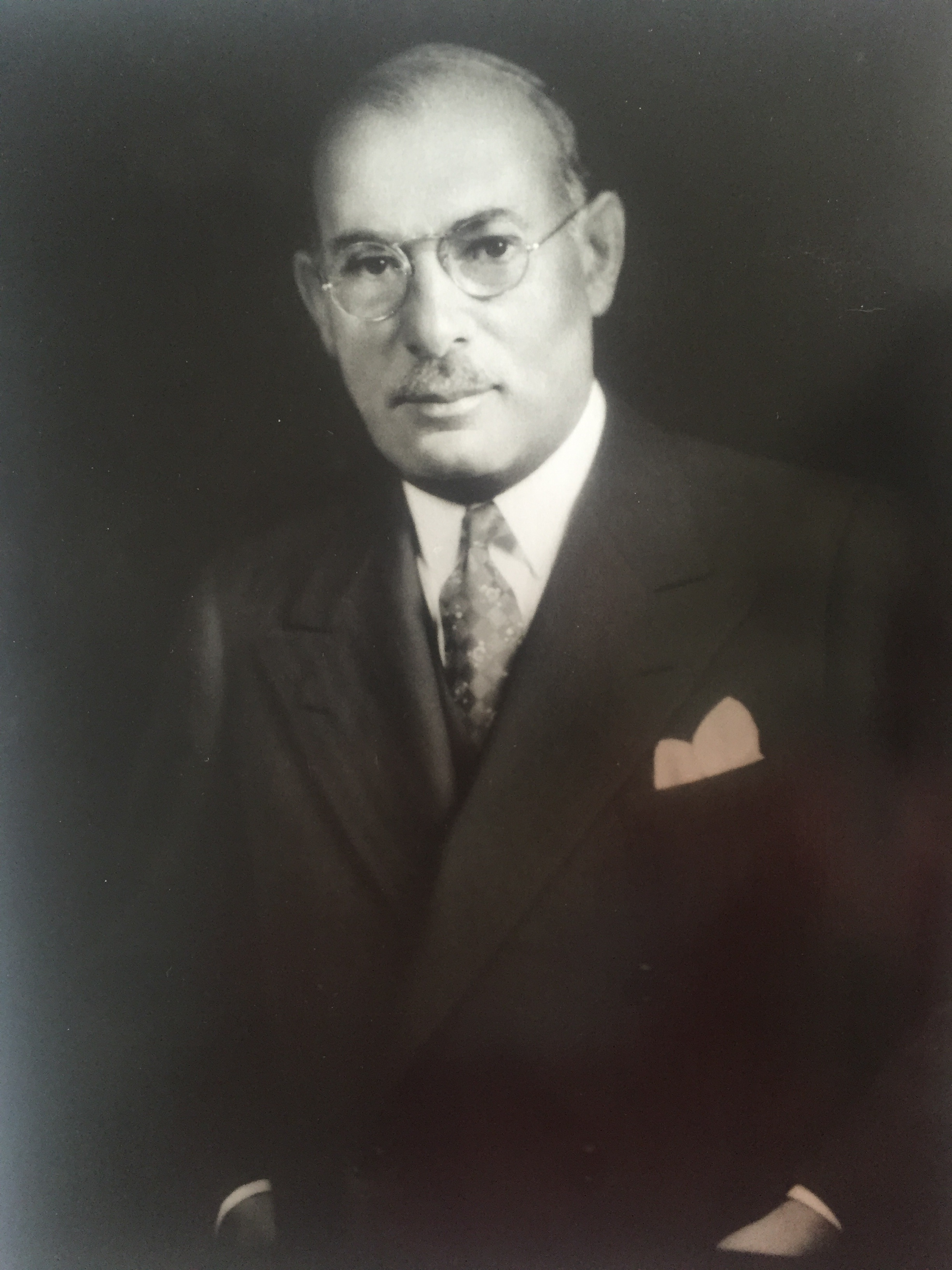
- Born: April 16, 1880; Lithuania
- Died: November 9, 1938 (aged 58)
- Occupation: Businessman
- Spouse: Lena Gurian
- Children: 6 including George Blumberg

Max Blumberg (April 16, 1880 – November 9, 1938) was a Lithuania-born American businessman and philanthropist.

== Biography ==
Blumberg was born to a Jewish family in Lithuania and immigrated to the United States when he was 14 settling in New York City. He worked as a millworker and later started his own business as a lumber wholesaler. Blumberg served as President of the Bensonhurst Sash and Door Company, the Globe Exchange Bank, the Globe Financial Corporation, and the Farmers Title Guarantee and Mortgage Company; he was Vice President of the Philippine Button Company.

Blumberg was a prominent Jewish philanthropist. He founded the Jewish orphanage, Pride of Judea Children's Home, in Williamsburg and the Jewish Chronic Disease Hospital in Brooklyn.

== Personal life ==
He was married to Lina Gurian (c. 1882–1966); they had six children including George Blumberg (d. 1960), who served in the New York State Assembly and the New York State Senate; Jack Blumberg (1910–1970) who took over the family's philanthropic activities; Elsie Blumberg Wolosoff who married homebuilder Leon Wolosoff; and William Blumberg who founded KF Lumber and Supply in Queens, New York. His granddaughter was Joan Wolosoff Wachtler, wife of Sol Wachtler, the Chief Judge of the New York Court of Appeals.

Blumberg died in 1938.
