= George Blumberg =

American politician and businessman (1903–1960)

Member of the New York State Senate from the 7th District
- In office 1933–1934
- Preceded by: John A. Hastings
- Succeeded by: Jacob J. Schwartzwald

Member of the New York State Assembly from Kings County's 6th District
- In office 1926–1926
- Preceded by: Joseph Reich
- Succeeded by: Jacob J. Schwartzwald

Personal details
- Born: April 29, 1903 Brooklyn, New York, U.S.
- Died: January 18, 1960 (aged 56)
- Party: Republican
- Parent(s): Max Blumberg; Lena Gurian Blumberg
- Occupation: Businessman, insurance broker

George Blumberg (April 29, 1903 – January 18, 1960) was an American businessman and politician from New York.

== Early life and career ==
He was born on April 29, 1903, in Brooklyn, New York City, the son of Max Blumberg and Lena (Gurian) Blumberg. He was Jewish. He engaged in the lumber business.

== Political career ==
Blumberg was a member of the New York State Assembly (Kings Co., 6th D.) in 1926. In 1932, he became an insurance broker. He was a member of the New York State Senate (7th D.) in 1933 and 1934. He served as a Republican.

== Later life and death ==
Later he was President of the Coastline Fuel Oil Corporation in Flushing, Queens.

He died on January 18, 1960; and was buried at the Mount Lebanon Cemetery in Glendale, Queens.

His niece was Joan Wolosoff, wife of Sol Wachtler, the Chief Judge of the New York Court of Appeals.

New York State Assembly
Preceded by Joseph Reich	New York State Assembly; Kings County, 6th District; 1926	Succeeded by Jacob J. Schwartzwald
New York State Senate
Preceded by John A. Hastings	New York State Senate; 7th District; 1933–1934	Succeeded by Jacob J. Schwartzwald
