= John A. Hastings =

American politician (1900–1964)

Member of the New York State Senate from the 7th District
- In office 1923–1932
- Preceded by: Charles C. Lockwood
- Succeeded by: George Blumberg

Personal details
- Born: April 21, 1900
- Died: December 8, 1964 (aged 64) Manhattan, New York, U.S.
- Party: Democratic
- Spouse: Margaret M. Crowley
- Children: 4
- Occupation: Insurance broker, politician

John Ambrose Hastings (April 21, 1900 – December 8, 1964) was an American politician from New York.

== Early life and career ==
He was born on April 21, 1900. He was Secretary and Treasurer of the All-American Brokers' Insurance Company. He married Margaret M. Crowley, and they had four children: John Barry Hastings, Warren T. Hastings, Marjorie Hastings and Virginia M. Hastings.

== Political career ==
Hastings was elected to the New York State Senate (7th D.) in 1922, then the youngest New York state senator in history. He remained in the State Senate from 1923 to 1932, sitting in the 146th, 147th, 148th, 149th, 150th, 151st, 152nd, 153rd, 154th and 155th New York State Legislatures; and was Chairman of the Committee on Printed and Engrossed Bills from 1923 to 1924.

=== Anti-Klan activities and drug package incident ===
Early in 1923, he sponsored anti-Ku Klux Klan legislation. On March 27, 1923, a parcel with a large quantity of drugs was left for him at the Ten Eyck Hotel in Albany, and Hastings suspected that it was a frame-up by the Klan or some other enemies. On April 25, he accused Philip Francis and Samuel Woodrow, two New York City newspaper editorial writers, of having planted the drug package.

=== Health and political activities ===
In October 1930, he suffered from acute appendicitis, was operated, and survived. Less than a year previously, the Democratic State Assembly minority leaders Maurice Bloch and Peter J. Hamill had died from appendicitis.

In November 1931, he accompanied Mayor Jimmy Walker on his visit to imprisoned labor leader Thomas Mooney in San Francisco.

=== Seabury investigation ===
During the Seabury Commission's investigation of corruption in New York City, Hastings was subpoenaed to testify before the Hofstadter Committee, but did not appear on January 4, 1932. Hastings was held in contempt, and was sentenced on January 29 by Supreme Court Justice Peter A. Hatting to 30 days in jail. On February 5, the Appellate Division upheld the jail sentence. On March 3, the New York Court of Appeals overturned the Appellate Division and, citing faulty procedure, voided the jail sentence.

Haggling over how to proceed to get Hastings to testify ensued for the following weeks. On March 21, Hastings appeared before the committee, but refused to answer any questions. Subsequently, Hastings himself was investigated, and was accused of having received money and stock for his lobbying on behalf of private bus companies. On May 19, Hastings finally appeared before the Hofstadter Committee, answered questions to defend himself, and denied all charges.

Testimony before the Hofstadter Committee showed that Hastings was heavily involved in the corrupt proceedings which led to Mayor Walker's resignation on September 1. Nevertheless, Hastings was nominated to run for re-election to his Senate seat. He was defeated in November 1932 by Republican George Blumberg although a Democratic U.S. president, New York Governor and New York Senate majority were elected at that time. Afterwards he became a public transport expert.

=== Arrest and later campaigns ===
On September 3, 1933, after a row at his Summer home in Kensington, New York, Hastings was arrested and charged with disorderly conduct. Later he pleaded guilty and received a suspended sentence.

In 1936, he ran on a "Loyal Party" ticket for Congress in New York's 16th congressional district, but was defeated by the incumbent Democrat John J. O'Connor.

== Death ==
He died on December 8, 1964, in Stuyvesant Polyclinic Hospital in Manhattan.

New York State Senate
| Preceded by Charles C. Lockwood | New York State Senate; 7th District; 1923–1932 | Succeeded by George Blumberg |
