= James L. Emery =

American politician (1931–2021)

Administrator of the Saint Lawrence Seaway Development Corporation
- In office February 1984 – February 1991
- Preceded by: David W. Oberlin
- Succeeded by: Stanford Parris

Member of the New York State Assembly
- In office January 1, 1965 – December 31, 1982
- Preceded by: Kenneth R. Willard
- Succeeded by: Richard C. Wesley
- Constituency: 1967-1982 136th District; 1966-1967 149th District; 1965-1966 Livingston County

Personal details
- Born: July 22, 1931 Livonia, New York, U.S.
- Died: October 26, 2021 (aged 90) Summerville, South Carolina, U.S.
- Party: Republican
- Children: 2
- Education: University of Cincinnati

James L. Emery (July 22, 1931– October 26, 2021) was an American politician from New York.

== Life ==
He was born on July 22, 1931, in Lakeville, Livingston County, New York. He attended Livonia Central School. He graduated from the University of Cincinnati's College of Business Administration.

He entered politics as a Republican, and was Sheriff of Livingston County.

He was a member of the New York State Assembly from 1965 to 1982, sitting in the 175th, 176th, 177th, 178th, 179th, 180th, 181st, 182nd, 183rd and 184th New York State Legislatures. He was Minority Leader from 1979 to 1982.

In 1982, Emery was a contender for the Republican nomination for Governor of New York, but eventually was nominated for Lieutenant Governor of New York on the Republican and Conservative tickets, with Lewis Lehrman for Governor. They were defeated by the Democratic and Liberal nominees Mario Cuomo and Alfred DelBello.

In October 1983, Emery was nominated by President Ronald Reagan as Administrator of the St. Lawrence Seaway Development Corporation. He was confirmed by the U.S. Senate in February 1984 for a term of seven years. He remained on the post until 1991 when he was succeeded by Stanford Parris.

He married Elsie McPhail, with whom he had two sons in 1957.

His second wife Jill Houghton Emery (born 1941) ran in 1984 for Congress in the 34th District, but was defeated by the incumbent Democrat Stan Lundine. He was later married to Sandra Johnson Emery (born 1946).

Emery died on October 26, 2021 in Summerville, South Carolina.

New York State Assembly
Preceded by Kenneth R. Willard	New York State Assembly; Livingston County; 1965	Succeeded by district abolished
Preceded by new district	New York State Assembly; 149th District; 1966	Succeeded by Lloyd A. Russell
Preceded by Philip R. Chase	New York State Assembly; 136th District; 1967–1982	Succeeded by Richard C. Wesley
Preceded by Perry B. Duryea Jr.	Minority Leader in the New York State Assembly; 1979–1982	Succeeded by Clarence D. Rappleyea Jr.
Party political offices
Preceded by Bruce F. Caputo; 1978	Republican nominee for Lieutenant Governor of New York; 1982	Succeeded by E. Michael Kavanagh; 1986
