= Adirondack League Club =

U.S. nonprofit organization

- Logo of the Adirondack League Club
- Formation: 1890; 136 years ago
- Type: Nonprofit
- Tax ID no.: 15-0227290
- Legal status: 501(c)(7)
- Headquarters: New York (state)
- Website: https://www.alcclub.org

The Adirondack League Club is an organization that owns a large piece of wilderness land in the New York State Adirondack Park.

== History ==
The club was founded in 1890 as a club for hunting and fishing. The club was involved in a protracted legal dispute with the Sierra Club over the right of public access to streams and other waterways. The Adirondack League Club is known for its socially and politically influential members, including gilded era industrialists and several past Presidents of the United States. Its operations shut down in the spring due to its dirt roads being impassable, with mud being created by runoff from melting snow. It prides itself on the preservation of the large amount of wilderness it owns, protecting its land from the invasive species in other bodies of water, including the nearby Fulton Chain. Motorboats are prohibited on all but three of its lakes, and all boats are thoroughly cleaned before entering its waters.

== See also ==
- Adirondack League Club v. Sierra Club
