= New York International Arbitration Center =

American non-profit organisation

The New York International Arbitration Center (NYIAC) is an independent not-for-profit organization focused on providing hearing center services for international arbitrations, mediations and other forms of alternative dispute resolution under any arbitration rules. NYIAC does not administer hearings, but provides hearing rooms, breakout rooms, neutral areas and on-site support for dispute resolution cases. In addition, NYIAC organizes educational events and focuses on advancing and promoting international arbitration in New York by inviting practitioners to be involved. It is located in New York City.

The center was established following a recommendation by a force of the New York State Bar Association ("NYSBA") in 2011. The report of the Task Force on New York Law in International Matters emphasized the need for New York to maintain its role as a key player in international dispute resolution, and a permanent center would provide this dedicated space. According to NYIAC's founding Chair Judith Kaye, former Chief Judge of the State of New York: “With the opening of NYIAC, New York now has a world-class hearing center and hub for the city's thriving international urban community. The current NYIAC Chair is Louis Kimmelman and the executive director is Rekha Rangachari.

== Additional Information ==
- NYIAC Website
- Arbitration in the United States
- International Chamber of Commerce
- United States Department of Commerce: International Arbitration
- FINRA: Arbitration and Mediation
- The New York Convention
