= Carmen Beauchamp Ciparick =

American judge (born 1942)

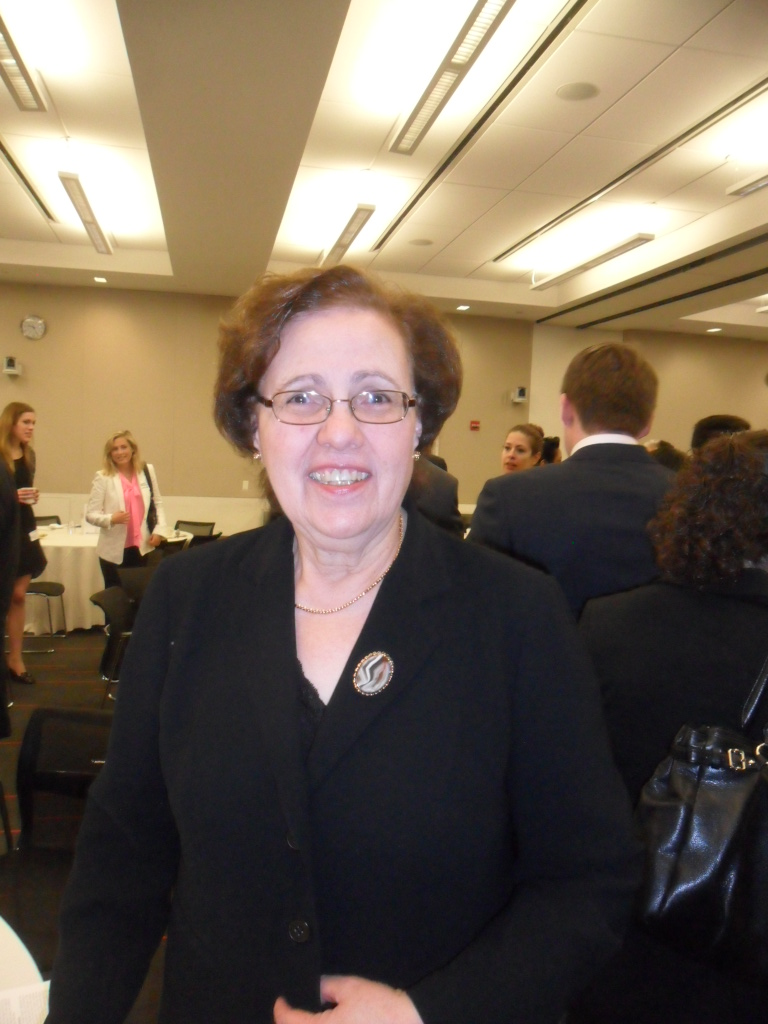

Associate Judge of the New York Court of Appeals
- In office 1994–2012
- Appointed by: Mario Cuomo
- Preceded by: Stewart F. Hancock Jr.
- Succeeded by: Jenny Rivera

Justice on the New York Supreme Court
- In office 1982–1994

Judge on the New York City Criminal Court
- In office 1978–1983
- Appointed by: Ed Koch

Personal details
- Born: January 1, 1942 (age 84) New York City, New York, U.S.
- Education: Hunter College; St. John's University School of Law

Carmen Beauchamp Ciparick (born January 1, 1942) is a judge who served as associate judge on the New York Court of Appeals, the highest court in the state of New York, from 1994 through 2012, when she reached mandatory retirement age. As of June 2015, she has returned to the practice of law. As of October 2024, at the age of 82, she was still working as Of Counsel at Greenberg Traurig, and was also Chairperson of the New York Board of Law Examiners.

== Early life and education ==
Judge Ciparick is the daughter of two migrants from Puerto Rico and grew up in Washington Heights. She is a 1963 graduate of Hunter College and a 1967 graduate of St. John's University School of Law. The Board of Trustees of the City University of New York has authorized Hunter College to award her an honorary Doctor of Laws at commencement exercises scheduled for January 24, 2013.

== Legal career ==
Following law school and passing the bar, Ciparick worked for the Legal Aid Society. In 1978, she was appointed Judge of the New York City Criminal Court. She was elected as a justice of New York Supreme Court in 1982.

Judge Ciparick was appointed to the New York Court of Appeals by Governor Mario Cuomo in 1994. She was reappointed to the Court by Governor Eliot Spitzer in 2007. Upon reaching the mandatory retirement age, Ciparick retired on December 31, 2012.

In the well-known Court of Appeals case of Hernandez v. Robles, the court held, by a 4-2 majority, that the state constitution did not require the recognition of same-sex marriage. Chief Judge Judith Kaye wrote a strongly worded dissent that Ciparick joined.

In 2012, she had returned to the practice of law, and was working as of October 2024 at the notable law firm of Greenberg Traurig.

== See also ==
- List of Hispanic and Latino American jurists
- List of first women lawyers and judges in New York

Legal offices
Preceded by Stewart F. Hancock, Jr.	Associate Judge of the New York Court of Appeals; 1993–2012	Succeeded by Jenny Rivera
