= Richard D. Simons =

American judge (1927–2022)

Associate Judge of the New York Court of Appeals
- In office 1993–1997

Acting Chief Judge of the New York Court of Appeals
- In office 1992–1993
- Preceded by: Sol Wachtler
- Succeeded by: Judith S. Kaye

Associate Judge of the New York Court of Appeals
- In office 1983–1992
- Appointed by: Mario Cuomo

Personal details
- Born: March 23, 1927 Niagara Falls, New York, U.S.
- Died: July 17, 2022 (aged 95)

Richard Duncan Simons (March 23, 1927 – July 17, 2022) was an American lawyer and judge from New York. He was Acting Chief Judge of the New York Court of Appeals from 1992 to 1993.

== Life ==
Simons was in the United States Navy during World War II.

He was a justice of the New York Supreme Court from 1963 to 1983. In January 1983, he was appointed a judge of the New York Court of Appeals. After the resignation of Sol Wachtler in November 1992, Simons was chosen Acting Chief Judge of the Court of Appeals. He presided until the appointment of Judith S. Kaye in March 1993, and then resumed his seat as associate judge. He retired from the bench at the end of his 14-year term in January 1997.

His wife Muriel died aged 64 in March 1992 at the Crouse Irving Memorial Hospital in Syracuse, New York, after being treated for a lymphoma with a wrong drug. Cisplatin ("Platinol") was given instead of carboplatin ("Paraplatin").

He resided in Rome, New York with his second wife, Esther Tremblay Simons.

On July 17, 2022, Simons died at the age of 95.

== Sources ==
- The Political Graveyard: Index to Politicians: Simons Political Graveyard
- Fritsch, Jane (May 13, 1992). "Syracuse Hospital Admits Causing Death of Patient". The New York Times.
- 404 ERROR – N.Y. State Courts Listing of Court of Appeals judges, with portrait
- Pataki Gains Pick as Court Loses Judge His retirement announced, in NYT on April 6, 1996

Legal offices
| Preceded by Sol Wachtler | Chief Judge of the New York Court of Appeals; Acting; 1992–1993 | Succeeded by Judith S. Kaye |
