= Jenny Rivera (judge) =

American judge (born 1960)

Associate Judge of the New York Court of Appeals
- Incumbent
- Assumed office February 11, 2013
- Appointed by: Andrew Cuomo
- Preceded by: Carmen Beauchamp Ciparick

Personal details
- Born: December 1960 (age 65) New York City, New York, U.S.
- Party: Democratic
- Education: Princeton University (AB); New York University (JD); Columbia University (LLM)

Jenny Rivera (born December 1960) is a judge on the New York Court of Appeals. A Democrat, Rivera was appointed to the court by Andrew Cuomo in 2013 for a 14-year term. Her current term expires in 2027. She is the second Hispanic woman to serve on New York's highest court, after Carmen Beauchamp Ciparick.

== Early life and education ==
Rivera was born in December 1960 in New York City. She graduated from Princeton University in 1982. She earned her Juris Doctor from New York University School of Law three years later, and a Master of Laws from Columbia University School of Law in 1993.

== Legal experience ==
After obtaining her Juris Doctor in 1985, Rivera spent a year clerking at the United States Court of Appeals for the Second Circuit's Pro Se Law Clerk's office. She spent the next year as a staff attorney for the New York City Legal Aid Society in the Homeless Family Rights Project before joining the Puerto Rican Legal Defense and Education Fund, where she remained as associate counsel until 1992. In 1992, Rivera served as an Administrative Law Judge for the New York State Division of Human Rights.

In 1993, after completing her LL.M. which focused on constitutional and feminist theory, Rivera served as a law clerk to then-U.S. District Judge Sonia Sotomayor of the Southern District of New York; Sotomayor was later elevated to the Second Circuit and the U.S. Supreme Court. Following the completion of that clerkship, Rivera taught for three years at Suffolk University Law School.

Rivera joined the faculty of the City University of New York School of Law in 1997. She would teach there nearly continuously until her appointment to the New York Court of Appeals in 2013. From 2007 to 2008 Rivera was Special Deputy Attorney General for Civil Rights in the New York Attorney General's office and in 2011 she was a visiting professor at American University Washington College of Law.

Her selection to New York's highest court was controversial. Rivera was the first nominee in history to be advanced out of the New York State Senate's Judiciary Committee without recommendation. Nevertheless, she was confirmed by the full Senate on February 11, 2013.

In September 2021, Rivera was barred from entering the courthouse because she refused a COVID-19 vaccine; she was the only one of her colleagues to refuse the COVID-19 vaccine. In July 2022, Rivera announced that she would be receiving the Novavax COVID-19 vaccine.

== See also ==
- List of Hispanic and Latino American jurists
- List of first women lawyers and judges in New York

Legal offices
Previous: Carmen Beauchamp Ciparick	Associate Judge of the New York Court of Appeals; 2013–present	Incumbent
