= Central Brooklyn =

Central Brooklyn consists of several neighborhoods often grouped together because of their large populations of African Americans and Caribbean Americans. Central Brooklyn is the largest collection of black communities in both New York City and the United States. These neighborhoods include:

- Bedford-Stuyvesant, which broadly includes smaller communities such as
  - Ocean Hill
  - Stuyvesant Heights
- Crown Heights, which includes smaller communities such as
  - Weeksville
- East Flatbush, which may be grouped together with the smaller neighborhood of Wingate
- Flatbush, which broadly includes smaller communities such as
  - Ditmas Park
  - Prospect Lefferts Gardens
  - Prospect Park South

Other communities that may be included in a broader definition of Central Brooklyn are:

- Brownsville
- Canarsie
- Clinton Hill
- East New York
- Fort Greene
- Prospect Heights

Central Brooklyn is centered in the following zip codes:

- 11203
- 11213
- 11216
- 11221
- 11225
- 11226
- 11233
- 11238
- 11233
