= Judith Kaye =

American judge (1938–2016)

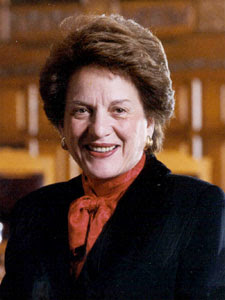

Chief Judge of the New York Court of Appeals
- In office March 23, 1993 – December 31, 2008
- Appointed by: Mario Cuomo (1993); Eliot Spitzer (2007)
- Preceded by: Richard D. Simons (acting)
- Succeeded by: Jonathan Lippman

Associate Judge of the New York Court of Appeals
- In office September 12, 1983 – March 23, 1993
- Appointed by: Mario Cuomo
- Preceded by: Jacob D. Fuchsberg
- Succeeded by: Howard A. Levine

Personal details
- Born: Judith Ann Smith; August 4, 1938 Monticello, New York, U.S.
- Died: January 7, 2016 (aged 77) New York City, New York, U.S.
- Spouse: Stephen Kaye (m. 1964; died 2006)
- Children: 3
- Education: Barnard College (BA); New York University (LLB)

Judith Ann Kaye (née Smith; August 4, 1938 – January 7, 2016) was an American lawyer, jurist and the longtime Chief Judge of the New York Court of Appeals, serving in that position from 1993 to 2008.

She was the first woman to serve as chief judge, the highest judicial office in New York State, and the longest-serving chief judge in New York history.

== Early life and education ==
Kaye was born as Judith Ann Smith in Monticello, New York on August 4, 1938. Her parents, Benjamin and Lena (née Cohen) Smith, were Jewish immigrants from Poland who lived on a farm in Sullivan County, New York, and operated a women's apparel store.

She skipped two grades, graduating from Monticello High School (New York) aged fifteen. She then graduated from Barnard College of Columbia University in 1958 with B.A. in Latin American civilization. She became a reporter for the Union City, New Jersey Hudson Dispatch, where she was a society news reporter, but left to become a lawyer.

She worked as a copy editor during the day and attended night school at the New York University Law School, graduating with an LL.B. cum laude in 1962, as one of ten women in a class of almost 300. Kaye was admitted to the New York State Bar in 1963.

== Legal career ==
She began her career in private practice in New York City at the law firm of Sullivan & Cromwell. Kaye left Sullivan & Cromwell to join the IBM legal department. While raising a family, Kaye worked as a part-time assistant to the dean of the New York University Law School, her alma mater.

In 1969, Kaye was hired by the prominent law firm of Olwine, Connelly, Chase, O'Donnell & Weyher as a litigation associate. In 1975, she became that firm's first female partner.

== Appointment to the bench ==
Mario Cuomo, a Democrat, made a campaign promise in his successful 1982 campaign for governor of New York to appoint a woman to the New York Court of Appeals—the state's highest court. When the first vacancy arose, however, no woman appeared on the list submitted by the state Commission on Judicial Selection.

After another vacancy occurred, however, the commission listed two women on its list of seven candidates: Kaye (who was at the time 44 years old and a commercial litigator) and Betty Weinberg Ellerin (a judge on the New York Supreme Court, the trial court in New York, and the former president of the Women's Bar Association). Cuomo interviewed Kaye twice and appointed her to the bench for a 14-year term, making her the first woman to serve on the court.

== Tenure on the New York Court of Appeals ==
Kaye was nominated by Cuomo to be an associate judge on August 11, 1983. She was confirmed unanimously by the senate on September 6, and then sworn in on September 12, 1983.

In November 1992, Chief Judge Sol Wachtler resigned after being arrested on charges that he extorted money from a former lover. Cuomo nominated Kaye to fill the chief judge vacancy on February 22, 1993. She was confirmed unanimously by the senate on March 17, and then sworn in on March 23, 1993. With her term set to expire, Governor Eliot Spitzer renominated Kaye as chief judge on February 7, 2007. She was confirmed by the senate on March 6, and sworn in on March 19, 2007.

The chief judge of New York has both an administrative role (overseeing the entire state court system, which in 2016 had about 16,000 employees) and a judicial role (hearing and deciding appeals to the state's highest court). In 2008, as Kaye approached mandatory retirement age, The New York Times editorial board praised her, writing: "In her 15 years as chief, Judith Kaye has excelled at both, earning national praise for her jurisprudence and as a court reformer."

=== As court administrator ===
As chief judge, Kaye pushed forward with judicial reform and modernization efforts. New York State became a national leader in establishing problem-solving courts, which offered treatment and other alternatives to incarceration in cases involving addiction, mental illness, or domestic violence and abuse.

=== As court reformer ===
In the late 1990s, Kaye spearheaded a drive to make jury duty in New York State more efficient and convenient. Kaye successfully pushed to eliminate most all exemptions from "jury service" (a phrase Kaye preferred over "jury duty"). She also sought to improve prospective jurors' working conditions and selection process in assembly rooms and courtrooms, and to decrease the intrusive frequency of jury duty (now no more frequent than every six years throughout the state).

Kaye later helped establish the Center for Court Innovation, a non-profit think tank that although independent of the court system, serves as the judiciary's research and development arm.

=== Jurisprudence and notable opinions ===
Kaye emphasized civil liberties and interpreted the Constitution of New York as providing broader protections in some areas than those provided for by the federal Constitution. Kaye was viewed as a liberal, but was perceived as moving toward the pragmatic center after becoming chief judge, in an effort to build consensus among the justices.

According to judge Jonathan Lippmann who was her chief administrative judge and successor as chief judge "Judith Kaye essentially started a revolution, that has redefined the traditional role of the judiciary in addressing the difficult social problems reflected in our record-breaking court dockets: drug abuse, family violence and dysfunction, mental illness and so many more"

- Kaye voted four times against capital punishment in New York. In People v. Smith (1984), the court ruled in an opinion written by Kaye that the death penalty as applied in New York violated the Eighth Amendment. In In re Robert T. Johnson (1997), however, Kaye wrote for the court in holding that Governor George Pataki had the right to replace Bronx County District Attorney Robert T. Johnson over a case involving the murder of a police officer, since it appeared that Johnson would never seek to impose the death penalty.
- In an important libel case, Immuno AG v. J. Moor-Jankowski (1991), Kaye ruled for the defendant, the editor of a scientific journal who had been sued by a company for publishing a critical letter to the editor. Kaye emphasized that in libel cases, summary judgment can be important in encouraging the exercise of First Amendment rights.
- Kaye dissented from the court's 4-2 opinion in Hernandez v. Robles (2006), in which the majority held that the state constitution did not compel recognition of marriage between same-sex partners. In a sharply written dissenting opinion, Kaye (joined by Carmen Beauchamp Ciparick) wrote that the ruling was "an unfortunate misstep" and compared a prohibition of same-sex marriage to a prohibition of interracial marriage. Kaye wrote: "The long duration of a constitutional wrong cannot justify its perpetuation, no matter how strongly tradition or public sentiment might support it."

== Retirement and career after leaving the bench ==
Kaye retired on December 31, 2008, after reaching the age of 70, the state's mandatory retirement age for judges. Kaye had "made occasional negative references to the mandatory retirement requirement, once saying experienced jurists were being forced from the bench to the 'great detriment' of the courts."

Kaye gave her farewell speech on November 12, 2008, and formally retired on the last day of that year. She was the longest-serving chief judge in New York history. Judge Carmen Beauchamp Ciparick briefly became acting chief judge after Kaye's retirement; Jonathan Lippman was nominated and confirmed to the post and was formally sworn in in February 2009.

In February 2009, Kaye joined Skadden, Arps, Slate, Meagher & Flom in New York City as of counsel.

On March 11, 2010, then-New York Attorney General Andrew Cuomo appointed Kaye as an independent counsel to investigate Governor David Paterson's alleged violation of ethics laws, due to Cuomo's conflict of interest. In that role, she was granted the authority to investigate various charges against the governor, and to bring criminal charges. Her final determination pertaining to her investigation of Paterson was to not refer charges to the prosecutor's office against the sitting governor.

Governor Paterson appointed Kaye to the twelve-member Commission on Judicial Nomination for a four-year term beginning March 31, 2009. Kaye was elected as the commission's chair on May 21, 2009, and she continued in that role until her death.

== Personal life ==
Kaye married Stephen Rackow Kaye, a commercial litigator who had been her colleague at Sullivan & Cromwell and later a partner at the law firm of Proskauer Rose, on February 11, 1964. He died in 2006. They had three children: Luisa (Hagemeier), Jonathan and Gordon.

== Death ==
Kaye died on January 7, 2016, at her home in Manhattan, from lung cancer. A nonsmoker her entire life, she had been diagnosed with the disease about five years before her death. She was 77 years old.

== Memberships, awards and honors ==
Kaye received many honorary Doctor of Laws degrees from various universities.

At various times, Kaye served as a trustee and vice president of the Legal Aid Society; co-chair of the Permanent Judicial Commission on Justice for Children; trustee and vice-chair of the Clients Security Fund (later the Lawyers Fund for Client Protection); member of the board of directors of the Institute of Judicial Administration; member of the board of editors of New York State Bar Journal; member of the board of directors of the Conference of Chief Justices; member of the American Bar Association Commission on Domestic Violence; and founding member and honorary chair of the Judges and Lawyers Breast Cancer Alert (JALBCA).

Kaye served as a member of the boards of trustees of the American Judicature Society, New York University Law Center Foundation, and William Nelson Cromwell Foundation. She was also a trustee of Barnard College, serving from 1995 to 2002 and again from 2008 to 2009. President Jimmy Carter appointed Kaye to the U.S. Nominating Commission for Judges of the Second Circuit.

Kaye received a number of awards, including the Distinguished Jurist Award and Gold Medal of the New York State Bar Association and the ABA Justice Center's John Marshall Award. Kaye received the Barnard Medal of Distinction from Barnard College, the college's highest honor, in 1987. She was elected to the American Philosophical Society in 2003.

Kaye was a longtime member of Congregation Shearith Israel, a Sephardic synagogue in New York. Benjamin Cardozo, one of Kaye's predecessors as chief judge of the Court of Appeals of New York, was a congregant at the same synagogue.

== See also ==
- List of female state supreme court justices
- List of first women lawyers and judges in New York
- New York International Arbitration Center (NYIAC)

Legal offices
Preceded by Richard D. Simons; Acting	Chief Judge of the New York Court of Appeals; 1993–2008	Succeeded by Jonathan Lippman
