= 1880 New York state election =

- November 2, 1880

The 1880 New York state election was held on November 2, 1880, to elect the Chief Judge of the New York Court of Appeals, as well as all members of the New York State Assembly.

== History ==
In 1880, there was only one officer to be elected statewide: the Chief Judge of the Court of Appeals, to fill the vacancy caused by the death of Sanford E. Church in May 1880. Charles J. Folger had been appointed temporarily to fill the vacancy until the end of the year.

The Greenback state convention met on August 17 and 18 at Syracuse, New York. Thomas C. Armstrong was nominated for Chief Judge on the fifth ballot (fifth ballot: Armstrong 44, William Thornton 31, Wilson S. Wolfe had withdrawn already).

The Republican State Committee met on August 24 at New York City. Chester A. Arthur presided. The committee voted against the call of a state convention (vote: For 5, Against 26), and nominated unanimously the incumbent Chief Judge Charles J. Folger to succeed himself.

The Democratic state convention was held on September 28 at Saratoga Springs, New York. Rufus W. Peckham Jr., was Temporary Chairman. Charles A. Rapallo was nominated for Chief Judge on the first ballot (vote: Rapallo 185, William C. Ruger "less than 60", George B. Bradley - the Democratic candidate in 1878 - "fewer still").

== Result ==
The incumbent Chief Judge Folger was elected to succeed himself.

1880 state election result
Office	Republican ticket		Democratic ticket		Greenback ticket	
Chief Judge	Charles J. Folger	562,821	Charles A. Rapallo	517,661	Thomas C. Armstrong	13,183

== See also ==
- New York state elections

== Sources ==
- Result: RESULTS OF THE STATE CANVASS in NYT on December 3, 1880
- Result: The Tribune Almanac 1881
