= Nancy Andrews (biologist) =

American physician and biologist

Nancy C. Andrews
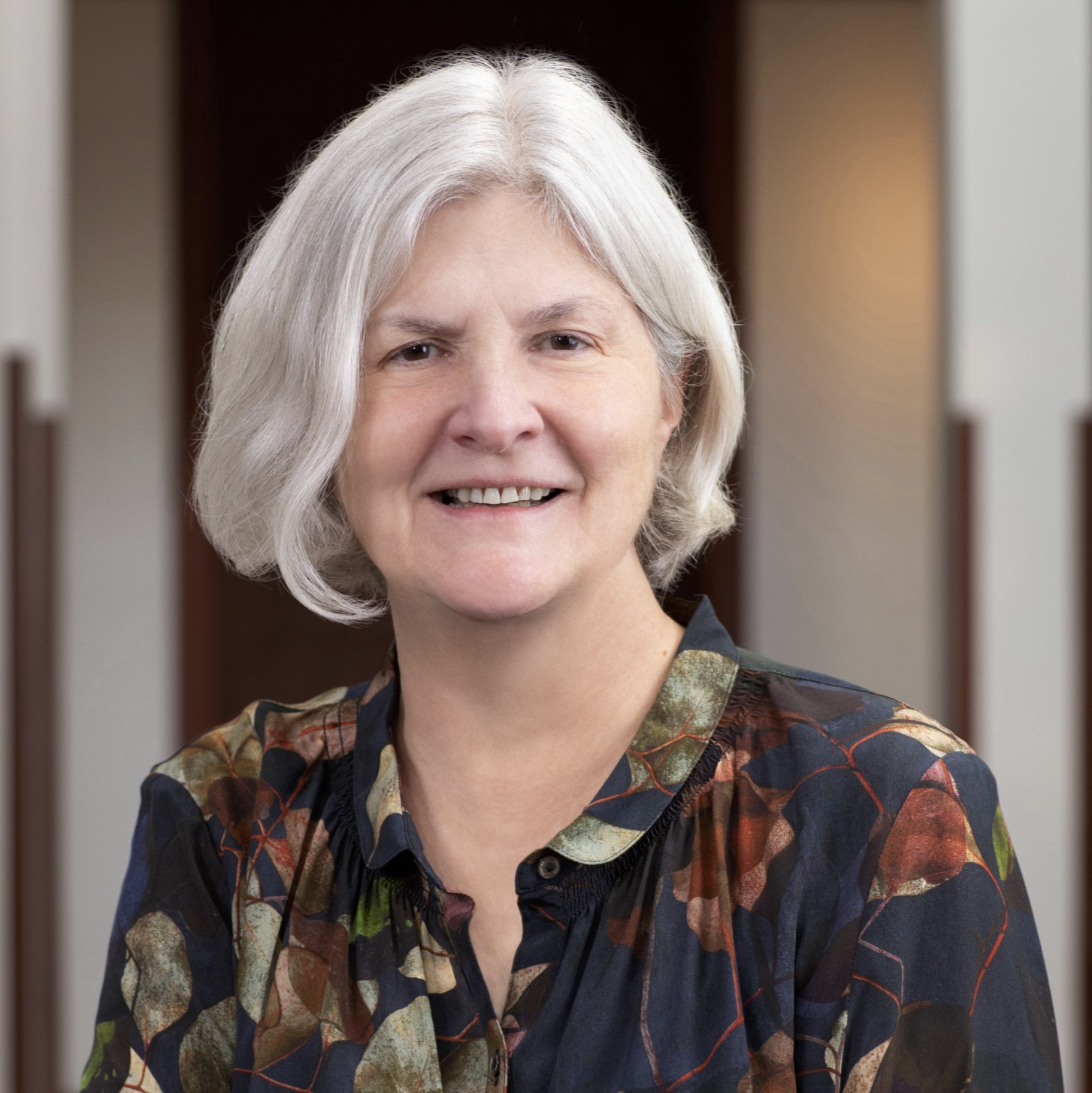
- Born: November 29, 1958 (age 67)
- Education: Yale University (BS, MS); Massachusetts Institute of Technology (PhD); Harvard University (MD)
- Scientific career
- Fields: Biology
- Workplaces: Dana–Farber Cancer Institute; Children’s Hospital Boston; Harvard Medical School; Duke University School of Medicine
- Doctoral advisor: David Baltimore
- Other academic advisors: Joan Steitz; Stuart Orkin

Nancy C. Andrews (born November 29, 1958) is an American biologist and physician noted for her research on iron homeostasis. Andrews was formerly Dean of the Duke University School of Medicine.

== Biography ==
Andrews grew up in Syracuse, New York. She earned a B.S. and M.S. from Yale University. She carried out her M.S. research with Joan Steitz, studying molecular biophysics and biochemistry, and continued her graduate work with David Baltimore. She earned a Ph.D. in biology in 1985 from M.I.T. and an M.D. from Harvard Medical School in 1987 . She completed her postdoctoral work with Stuart Orkin at Children's Hospital Boston.

Andrews then joined the faculty at Harvard University, Boston Children's Hospital and the Dana–Farber Cancer Institute in 1991, assuming an endowed chair in 2003, and the position of Dean for Basic Sciences and Graduate Studies at Harvard Medical School. In 2007, Andrews left to take a position as the first female Dean of Medicine at Duke University. In this position, she was the only woman heading any of the top ten medical schools in the U.S. She stepped down from the Deanship in 2017. Andrews was selected as the Executive Vice President and Chief Scientific Officer at Boston Children's Hospital in November 2021.

Andrews studied treatments for and molecular processes governing iron disease, such as anemia (iron deficiency) and hemochromatosis.

Andrews served as Chair of the Board of Directors of the American Academy of Arts and Sciences from 2017 to 2023 and is currently Home Secretary of the National Academy of Sciences. She is also a member of the Boards of Directors of Novartis, Charles River Laboratories and Maze Therapeutics.

== Personal life ==
She is married to fellow biologist Bernard Mathey-Prevot. She is the great-granddaughter of New York Court of Appeals Judge William Shankland Andrews and author Mary Raymond Shipman Andrews, and great-great-granddaughter of New York Court of Appeals Chief Judge Charles Andrews and Bishop Frederic Dan Huntington. She is also the great-niece of composer Roger Sessions, who was the brother of her paternal grandmother, Hannah Sargent Sessions Andrews.

== Awards and honors ==
- 1993–2006, Investigator, Howard Hughes Medical Institute
- 1998 Samuel Rosenthal Prize for Excellence in Academic Pediatrics
- 2000 American Federation for Medical Research Foundation Outstanding Investigator Award in Basic Science
- 2002 E. Mead Johnson Award from the Society for Pediatric Research
- 2004 Dean's Leadership Award for the Advancement of Women Faculty at Harvard Medical School.
- 2006 Elected to the National Academy of Medicine, National Academies of Science
- 2007 Elected as a Fellow of the American Academy of Arts and Sciences
- 2010 Vanderbilt Prize in Biomedical Science
- 2013 Henry M. Stratton Medal, American Society of Hematology
- 2015 Elected to the National Academy of Sciences

== Selected works ==
- Andrews NC, Erdjument-Bromage H, Davidson MB, Tempst P, Orkin SH. Erythroid transcription factor NF-E2 is a haematopoietic-specific basic-leucine zipper protein. Nature 1993; 362:722-8.
- Fleming MD, Trenor CC 3rd, Su MA, Foernzler D, Beier DR, Dietrich WF, and Andrews NC. Microcytic anemia mice have a mutation in Nramp2, a candidate iron transporter gene. Nature Genetics 1997; 16:383-6.
- Levy JE, Jin O, Fujiwara Y, Kuo F, Andrews NC. Transferrin receptor is necessary for development of erythrocytes and the nervous system. Nature Genetics 1999; 21:396-9.
- Andrews NC. Medical Progress: Disorders of Iron Metabolism. New England Journal of Medicine 1999;341:1986-95.
- Donovan A, Brownlie A, Zhou Y, Shepard J, Pratt SJ, Moynihan J, Paw BH, Drejer A, Barut B, Zapata A, Law TC, Brugnara C, Lux SE, Pinkus GS, Pinkus JL, Kingsley PD, Palis J, Fleming MD, Andrews NC, Zon LI. Positional cloning of zebrafish ferroportin 1 identifies a conserved vertebrate iron exporter. Nature 2000; 403:776-81.
- Andrews NC. The other physician-scientist problem: where have all the young girls gone? Nature Medicine 2002; 8:439-41.
- Donovan A, Lima CA, Pinkus JL, Pinkus GS, Zon LI, Robine S, Andrews NC. The iron exporter ferroportin (Slc40a1) is essential for iron homeostasis. Cell Metabolism 2005; 1:191-200.
- Gunshin H, Fujiwara Y, Custodio A, DiRenzo C, Robine S, Andrews NC. Slc11a2 is required for intestinal iron absorption and erythropoiesis but dispensable in placenta and liver. Journal of Clinical Investigation 2005; 115(5):1258-1266.
- Schmidt PJ, Toran PT, Giannetti AM, Bjorkman PJ and Andrews NC. The transferrin receptor modulates Hfe-dependent regulation of hepcidin expression. Cell Metabolism 2008; 7:205-14.
- Finberg KE, Heeney MM, Campagna DR, Aydinok Y, Pearson HA, Hartman KR, Mayo MM, Samuel SM, Strouse JJ, Markianos K, Andrews NC, Fleming MD. Mutations in TMPRSS6 cause iron-refractory, iron deficiency anemia. Nature Genetics 2008; 40:569-571.
- Xu W, Barrientos T, Mao L, Rockman HA, Sauve AA, Andrews NC. Lethal cardiomyopathy in mice lacking transferrin receptor in the heart. Cell Reports 2015; 13:533-45.
