= 1892 New York state election =

- November 8, 1892

The 1892 New York state election was held on November 8, 1892, to elect the Chief Judge of the New York Court of Appeals, as well as all members of the New York State Assembly. Besides, three amendments to the State Constitution were proposed: to transfer the settlement of contested elections to the courts, to authorize the sale of the state-owned salt works at Salina, New York, and to increase the number of New York Supreme Court justices by ten.

== History ==
In 1892, there was only one officer to be elected statewide: the Chief Judge of the Court of Appeals, to fill the vacancy caused by the death of William C. Ruger in January 1892. Robert Earl had been appointed temporarily to fill the vacancy until the end of the year.

The Republican State Committee met on October 11 at the Fifth Avenue Hotel in New York City. William Brookfield presided. The committee nominated Charles Andrews, the senior associate judge of the Court of Appeals (in office since 1870, Chief Judge by appointment 1881–82) for Chief Judge on the first ballot (vote: Andrews 26, Albert Haight 3).

The Democratic State Committee met on October 12 at the Hoffman House in New York City. Edward Murphy Jr. presided. The Democrats endorsed the Republican nominee Charles Andrews unanimously.

== Result ==
The jointly nominated judge Andrews was elected.

1892 state election result
Ticket	Republican		Democratic	Prohibition		Socialist Labor		People's	
Chief Judge	Charles Andrews	1,252,963	Charles Andrews	Walter Farrington	38,775	Francis Gerau	17,856	Lawrence J. McParlin	17,405

== See also ==
- New York state elections

== Sources ==
- The tickets: THE NATION AND THE STATES.; WHAT THE PEOPLE WILL VOTE FOR IN NOVEMBER in NYT on October 28, 1892
- Result in New York City: NEW-YORK'S OFFICIAL VOTE in NYT on November 29, 1892
- Result in Political and Governmental History of the State of New York by Ray Burdick Smith (Syracuse Press, 1922)
- Vote totals from The New York Red Book 1893
- Result: The Tribune Almanac 1893
