= 1882 New York gubernatorial election =

- November 7, 1882
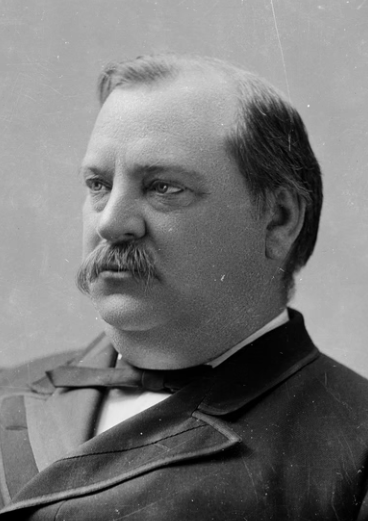

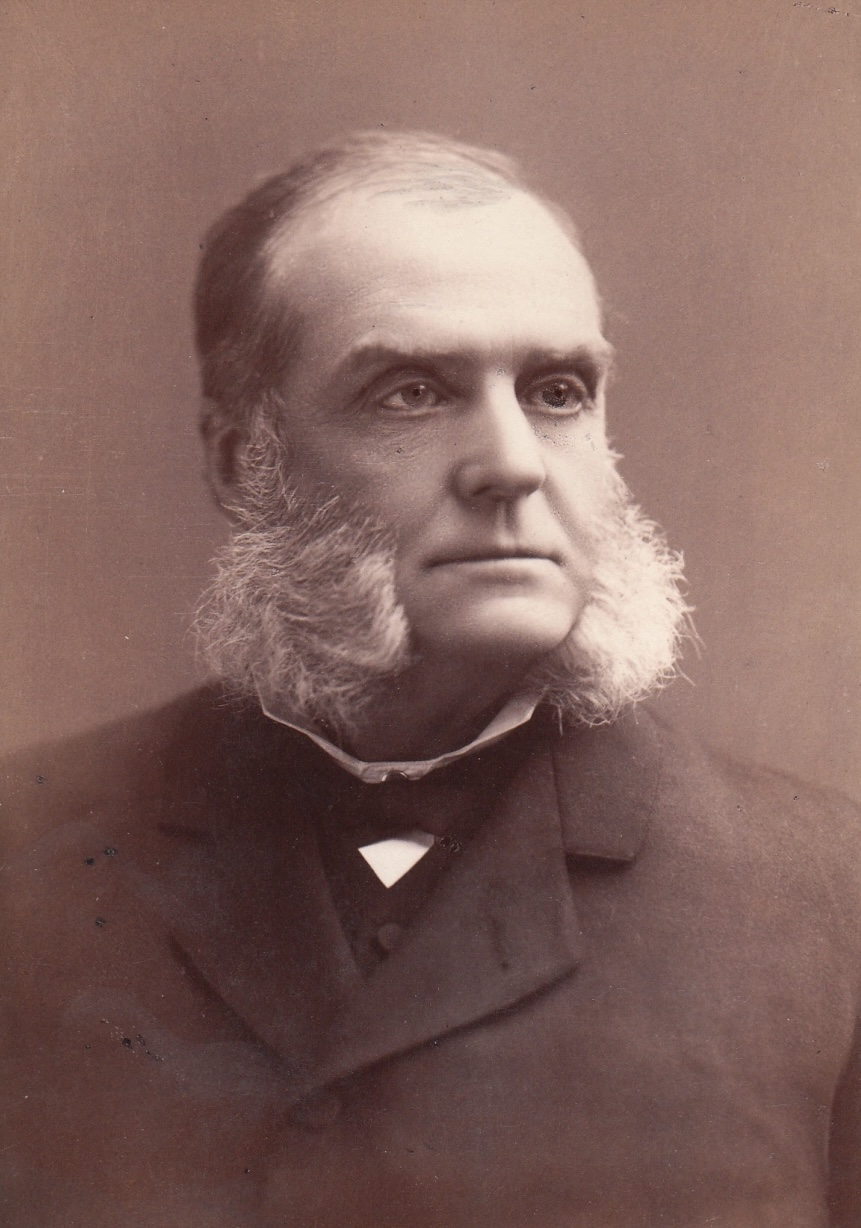
Nominee	Grover Cleveland	Charles J. Folger
Party	Democratic	Republican
Popular vote	535,318	342,464
Percentage	58.47%	37.41%
- County results Clevland: 40–50% 50–60% 60–70% 70–80% Folger: 40–50% 50–60% 60–70%
Governor before election
Alonzo B. Cornell
Republican
Elected Governor
Grover Cleveland
Democratic

The 1882 New York gubernatorial election was held on November 7, 1882.

Republican incumbent Alonzo B. Cornell ran for re-election to a second term in office, but was defeated for the Republican nomination by Charles J. Folger, the Secretary of the Treasury under President Chester A. Arthur. Folger's nomination was a victory for President Arthur and the Stalwart faction of the state party, but he was badly defeated in the general election by the mayor of Buffalo, Grover Cleveland.

== Republican nomination ==
=== Candidates ===
- Alonzo B. Cornell, incumbent Governor since 1880
- Charles J. Folger, United States Secretary of the Treasury
- John C. Robinson, former president of the Grand Army of the Republic and Lieutenant Governor
- John H. Starin, former U.S. Representative from Fultonville
- James Wolcott Wadsworth, U.S. Representative from Geneseo

=== Convention ===
The Republican state convention met on September 20 at Saratoga Springs. The Half-Breed faction led by Governor Alonzo B. Cornell opposed the Stalwart faction led by former U.S. Senators Roscoe Conkling and Thomas C. Platt, in league with railroad magnate Jay Gould.

The State Committee met at 9 o'clock at Congress Hall and elected Edward M. Madden, a Half-Breed, to be temporary chairman of the convention (vote Madden (St.) 18, Edmund L. Pitts (H.-B.) 14). The convention opened at half past 10 at Town Hall. The roll was called by John W. Vrooman, the Clerk of the New York State Senate. When Madden was proposed for temporary chairman, the Half-Breeds objected and proposed Pitts, and a vote was taken. Madden received 251, Pitts 243, showing an almost evenly divided convention with a slight Stalwart majority. U.S. Secretary of the Treasury Charles J. Folger (St.) was nominated for governor on the second ballot (first ballot: Folger 223, Cornell [incumbent] 180, James W. Wadsworth 69, John H. Starin 19, John C. Robinson 6; second ballot: Folger 257, Cornell 222, Wadsworth 18).

== Democratic nomination ==
The Democratic state convention met on September 22 at Shakespeare Hall in Syracuse, New York. The Tammany delegates were admitted again, and the rift in the Party was bridged over. Grover Cleveland was nominated for Governor.

== General election ==
=== Candidates ===
- Grover Cleveland, mayor of Buffalo (Democratic)
- Charles J. Folger, United States Secretary of the Treasury (Republican)
- Alonzo A. Hopkins, professor and perennial candidate (Prohibition)
- Epenetus Howe, Speedsville farmer and candidate for Secretary of State in 1881 (Greenback)

=== Results ===
1882 New York gubernatorial election
Party	Candidate	Votes	%	±%
Democratic	Grover Cleveland	535,318	58.47%	
Republican	Charles J. Folger	342,464	37.41%	
Prohibition	Alonzo A. Hopkins	25,783	2.82%	
Greenback	Epenetus Howe	11,974	1.31%	
Total votes		915,539	100.00%	

==== Results by county ====
County	Cleveland		Folger		Hopkins		Howe	
County	#	%	#	%	#	%	#	%
Albany	20,126	65.30%	10,309	33.45%	0	0.00%	385	1.25%
Allegany	3,779	40.06%	3,718	39.41%	1,586	16.81%	350	3.71%
Broome	5,060	48.43%	4,955	47.42%	325	3.11%	109	1.04%
Cattaraugus	5,279	47.12%	4,681	41.78%	781	6.97%	462	4.12%
Cayuga	5,859	51.33%	4,406	38.60%	698	6.11%	452	3.96%
Chautauqua	6,207	50.85%	4,803	39.35%	828	6.78%	369	3.02%
Chemung	5,336	58.36%	3,079	33.67%	78	0.85%	651	7.12%
Chenango	4,258	46.15%	3,913	42.41%	574	6.22%	482	5.22%
Clinton	3,560	44.81%	4,318	54.35%	18	0.23%	49	0.62%
Columbia	6,703	64.27%	3,607	34.59%	92	0.88%	27	0.26%
Cortland	3,011	46.90%	2,986	46.51%	379	5.90%	44	0.69%
Delaware	4,596	48.37%	4,331	45.58%	334	3.52%	240	2.53%
Dutchess	8,875	53.27%	7,321	43.94%	407	2.44%	58	0.35%
Erie	23,748	57.37%	16,408	39.64%	1,046	2.53%	190	0.46%
Essex	2,150	40.78%	2,951	55.97%	24	0.46%	147	2.79%
Franklin	2,294	41.80%	3,074	56.01%	25	0.46%	95	1.73%
Fulton	3,448	50.48%	3,011	44.08%	327	4.79%	45	0.66%
Genesee	3,518	51.26%	2,898	42.23%	395	5.76%	52	0.76%
Greene	4,481	58.07%	2,808	36.39%	273	3.54%	154	2.00%
Hamilton	407	53.20%	320	41.83%	28	3.66%	10	1.31%
Herkimer	5,131	54.08%	3,701	39.01%	625	6.59%	30	0.32%
Jefferson	7,190	56.86%	4,483	35.45%	925	7.32%	47	0.37%
Kings	65,636	68.86%	26,148	27.43%	2,548	2.67%	983	1.03%
Lewis	3,787	59.26%	2,447	38.29%	145	2.27%	11	0.17%
Livingston	3,966	48.59%	3,650	44.72%	413	5.06%	133	1.63%
Madison	4,328	50.27%	3,512	40.79%	648	7.53%	121	1.41%
Monroe	13,143	50.95%	11,056	42.86%	1,364	5.29%	234	0.91%
Montgomery	5,374	56.77%	3,927	41.49%	102	1.08%	63	0.67%
New York	124,914	71.45%	47,785	27.33%	584	0.33%	1,537	0.88%
Niagara	5,884	59.84%	3,256	33.11%	638	6.49%	55	0.56%
Oneida	13,673	58.05%	8,741	37.11%	913	3.88%	228	0.97%
Onondaga	11,563	48.70%	11,629	48.97%	522	2.20%	31	0.13%
Ontario	5,272	50.88%	4,675	45.12%	295	2.85%	120	1.16%
Orange	8,874	55.05%	6,541	40.57%	553	3.43%	153	0.95%
Orleans	3,119	49.99%	2,549	40.86%	543	8.70%	28	0.45%
Oswego	6,757	48.32%	6,376	45.59%	503	3.60%	348	2.49%
Otsego	5,848	51.66%	4,730	41.78%	677	5.98%	65	0.57%
Putnam	1,691	47.69%	1,825	51.47%	30	0.85%	0	0.00%
Queens	8,666	68.11%	3,698	29.06%	200	1.57%	160	1.26%
Rensselaer	13,714	56.36%	10,468	43.02%	0	0.00%	151	0.62%
Richmond	4,370	67.98%	2,012	31.30%	36	0.56%	10	0.16%
Rockland	2,771	63.88%	1,473	33.96%	89	2.05%	5	0.12%
Saratoga	6,227	48.84%	6,185	48.51%	304	2.38%	34	0.27%
Schenectady	2,836	50.26%	2,604	46.15%	157	2.78%	46	0.82%
Schoharie	4,924	68.11%	2,076	28.72%	174	2.41%	55	0.76%
Schuyler	2,155	48.59%	2,151	48.50%	59	1.33%	70	1.58%
Seneca	3,510	56.51%	2,555	41.14%	106	1.71%	40	0.64%
St. Lawrence	5,220	35.23%	9,304	62.79%	279	1.88%	15	0.10%
Steuben	8,997	51.94%	6,577	37.97%	1,276	7.37%	473	2.73%
Suffolk	5,287	55.73%	3,815	40.21%	331	3.49%	54	0.57%
Sullivan	3,451	55.43%	2,266	36.40%	119	1.91%	390	6.26%
Tioga	3,583	47.97%	3,143	42.08%	369	4.94%	374	5.01%
Tompkins	3,619	51.04%	2,690	37.94%	324	4.57%	458	6.46%
Ulster	8,470	55.33%	6,140	40.11%	655	4.28%	42	0.27%
Warren	2,677	47.36%	2,560	45.29%	76	1.34%	339	6.00%
Washington	4,190	40.57%	5,929	57.40%	151	1.46%	59	0.57%
Wayne	4,296	45.52%	4,251	45.04%	541	5.73%	350	3.71%
Westchester	11,478	63.96%	6,005	33.46%	314	1.75%	148	0.82%
Wyoming	2,909	49.25%	2,120	35.90%	859	14.54%	18	0.30%
Yates	2,073	42.95%	2,501	51.82%	118	2.45%	134	2.78%

== Sources ==
- Result (lacking a few counties' returns): COMPLETE VOTE FOR STATE OFFICERS AS CANVASSED BY THE COUNTY SUPERVISORS in NYT on November 25, 1882
- Result for Governor and Judge: THE NOVEMBER ELECTIONS in NYT on November 5, 1883 (recalling the previous result)
- Result The Tribune Almanac 1883

== See also ==
- New York gubernatorial elections
