= Edward Tracy =

Edward Tracy may refer to:

- Edward D. Tracy, Confederate States Army general
- Edward G. Tracy, American pharmacist and politician from New York
- Ed Tracy, British television writer and television director

== See also ==
- Edward Tracey, Irish boxer
