= Charles A. Rapallo =

American judge

Charles Anthony Rapallo (September 15, 1823 New York City – December 28, 1887 New York City) was an American lawyer and politician from New York.

== Life ==
He was the son of Anthony Rapallo and Elizabeth (Gould) Rapallo. He was educated exclusively by his father who was eminent for his accomplishments both as a lawyer and as a linguist, and from whom the son learned to speak English, French, Spanish, and Italian, and received seven years' instruction in law. He never went to school. In 1837, he began to study law in his father's office, was admitted to the bar in 1843, and practiced in New York City.

In 1870, he was elected on the Democratic ticket to a fourteen-year term on the New York Court of Appeals, being the first ever Italian American to ever be elected to it. In 1880, he ran for Chief Judge but was defeated by Republican Charles J. Folger. Rapallo was re-elected in 1884, and died in office.

He died of "Bright's disease and heart trouble" at his home at 17 West Thirty-first Street in New York City.
