= Palsgraf v. Long Island Railroad Co. =

1928 American tort law case

- Court: New York Court of Appeals
- Full case name: Helen Palsgraf v. The Long Island Railroad Company
- Argued: February 24, 1928
- Decided: May 29, 1928
- Citation: 248 N.Y. 339; 162 N.E. 99; 1928 N.Y. LEXIS 1269; 59 A.L.R. 1253

Case history
- Prior history: Judgment to plaintiff for $6,000 and costs, Kings County Supreme Court, May 31, 1927 (Burt Jay Humphrey, J.); affirmed, 222 A.D. 166, 25 N.Y.S. 412 (App. Div. 1927)
- Subsequent history: Reargument denied, 249 N.Y. 511, 164 N.E. 564 (1928)

Holding
- Defendant could not be held liable for an injury that could not be reasonably foreseen. New York Supreme Court, Appellate Division, reversed and complaint dismissed.

Court membership
- Chief judge: Benjamin Cardozo
- Associate judges: Cuthbert W. Pound, William S. Andrews, Frederick Crane, Irving Lehman, Henry Kellogg, John F. O'Brien

Case opinions
- Majority: Cardozo, joined by Pound, Lehman, Kellogg
- Dissent: Andrews, joined by Crane, O'Brien

Palsgraf v. Long Island Railroad Co., 248 N.Y. 339, 162 N.E. 99 (1928), is a leading case in American tort law on the question of liability to an unforeseeable plaintiff. The case was heard by the New York Court of Appeals, the highest state court in New York; its opinion was written by Chief Judge Benjamin Cardozo, a leading figure in the development of American common law and later a United States Supreme Court justice.

The plaintiff, Helen Palsgraf, was waiting at a Long Island Rail Road station in August 1924 while taking her daughters to the beach. Two men attempted to board the train before hers; one (aided by railroad employees) dropped a package that exploded, causing a large coin-operated scale on the platform to hit her. After the incident, she began to stammer, and subsequently sued the railroad, arguing that its employees had been negligent while assisting the man, and that she had been harmed by the neglect. In May 1927, she obtained a jury verdict of $6,000 ($111,207 in 2025), which the railroad appealed. Palsgraf gained a 3–2 decision in the Appellate Division, and the railroad appealed again. Cardozo wrote for a 4–3 majority of the Court of Appeals, ruling that there was no negligence because the employees, in helping the man board, did not breach any duty of care to Palsgraf as injury to her was not a foreseeable harm from aiding a man with a package. The original jury verdict was overturned, and the railroad won the case.

A number of factors, including the bizarre facts and Cardozo's outstanding reputation, made the case prominent in the legal profession, and it remains so, taught to most if not all American law students in torts class. Cardozo's conception, that tort liability can only occur when a defendant breaches a duty of care the defendant owes to a plaintiff, causing the injury sued for, has been widely accepted in American law. In dealing with proximate cause, many states have taken the approach championed by the Court of Appeals' dissenter in Palsgraf, Judge William S. Andrews.

== Background ==
At the time of the 1928 New York Court of Appeals decision in Palsgraf, that state's case law followed a classical formation for negligence: the plaintiff had to show that the Long Island Railroad (Note: It became known as the "Long Island Rail Road" in 1944. See Manz, p. 796 n.83) ("LIRR" or "the railroad") had a duty of care, and that she was injured through a breach of that duty. It was not required that she show that the duty owed was to her. Under New York precedent, the usual duty of utmost care that the railroad as a common carrier owed its customers did not apply to platforms and other parts of the station.

=== Facts ===
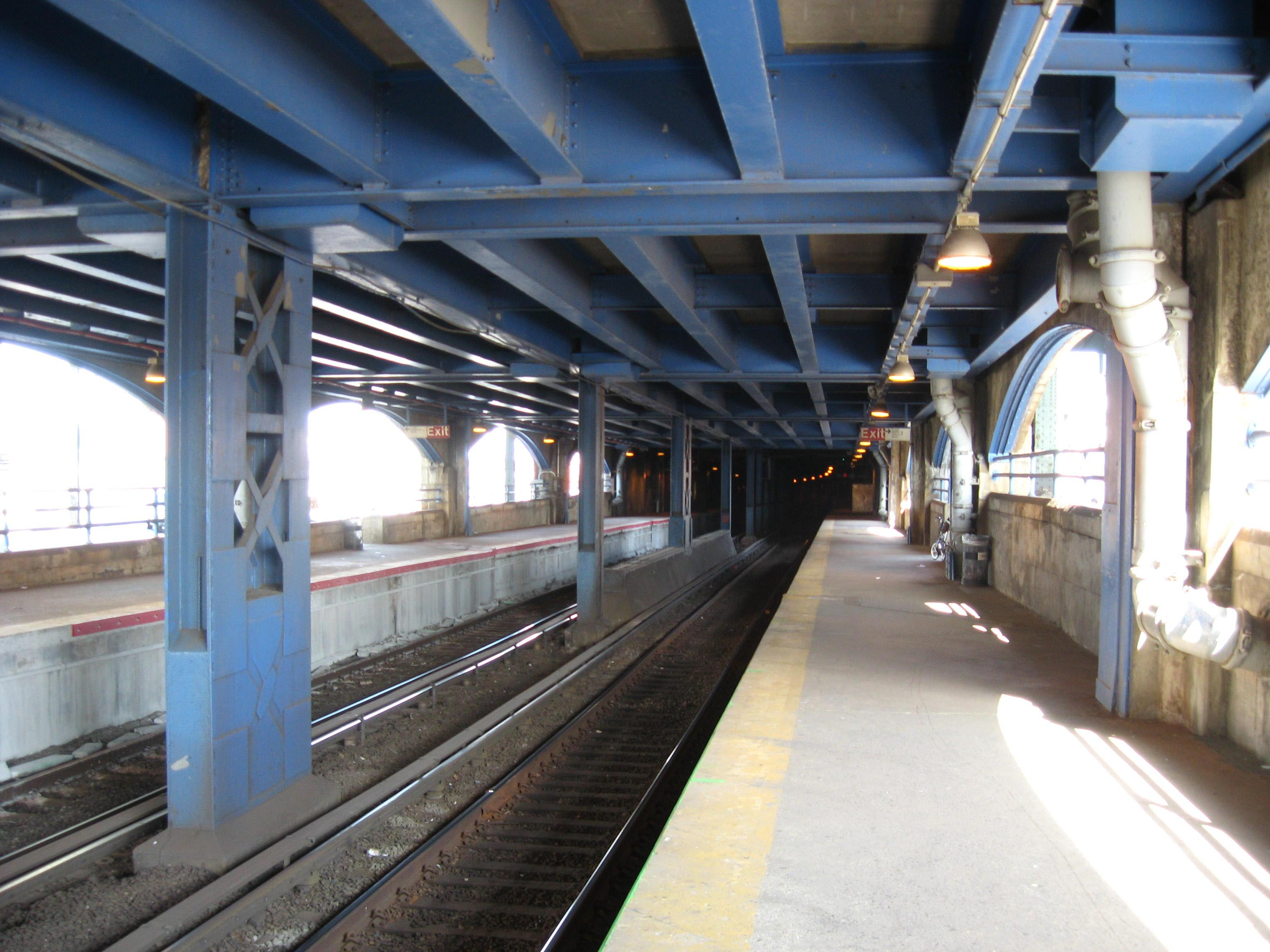
The East New York station of the Long Island Rail Road, seen in 2008

Sunday, August 24, 1924, was a warm summer day in Brooklyn, and Helen Palsgraf, a 40-year-old janitor and housekeeper, was taking her two daughters, Elizabeth and Lillian, aged 15 and 12, to Rockaway Beach. Having paid the necessary fare, they were on the platform at the East New York station of the LIRR on Atlantic Avenue in Brooklyn, when a train, not theirs, pulled in. As it began to move again, two men raced for the train, and one made it without incident, as the doors had not closed. The other, a man carrying a package, leapt aboard, with the help of a platform guard pushing him from behind as a member of the train's crew pulled him into the car. But in the process, the man lost the package, which dropped and exploded, for it apparently contained fireworks. Either the force of the explosion or the panicking of those on the platform caused a tall, coin-operated scale to topple onto Helen Palsgraf. No one was hurt enough to spend the night in the hospital, though several people, Palsgraf among them, were listed as injured.

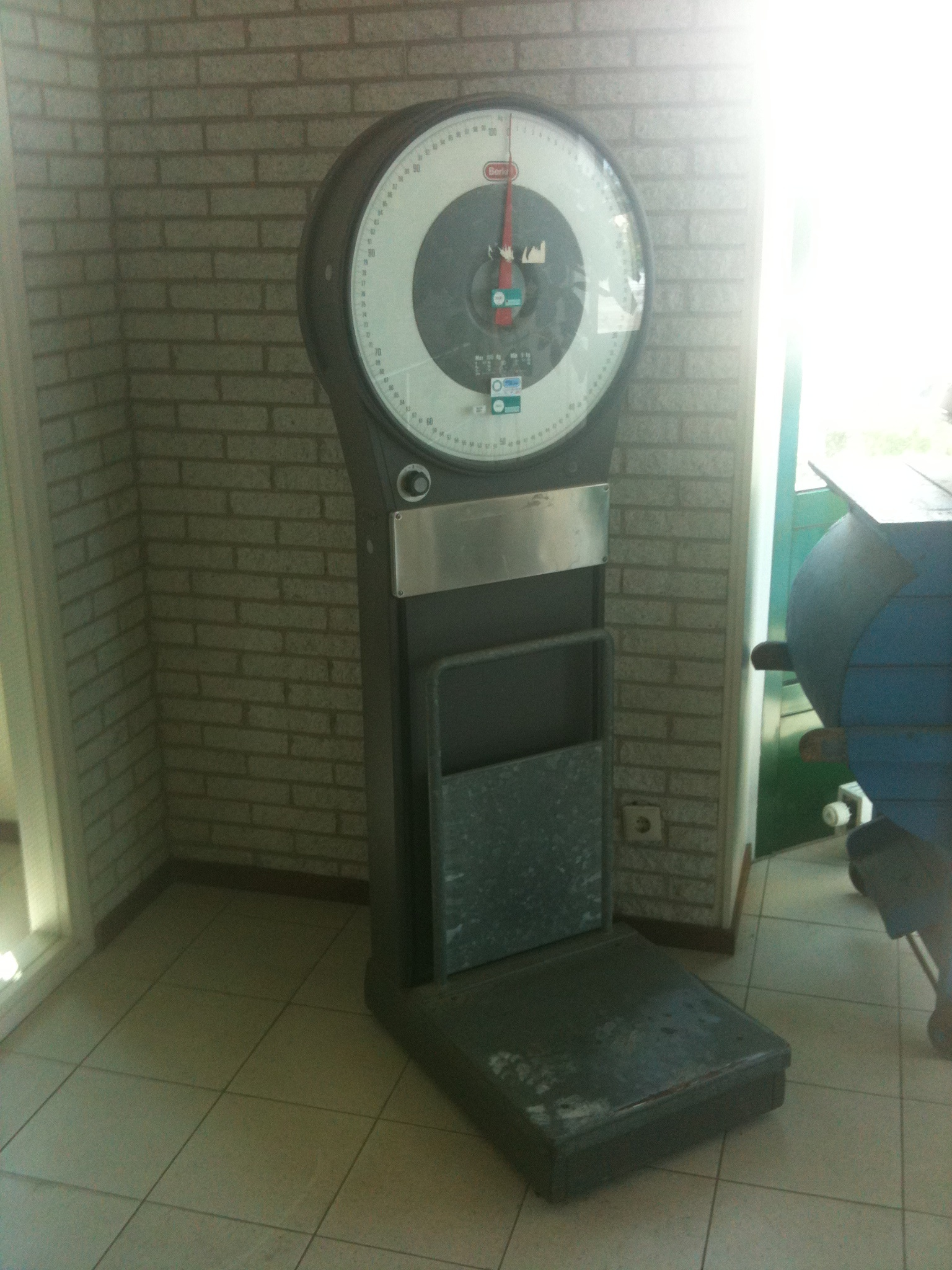
Scale similar in design to the one believed to have toppled onto Helen Palsgraf

Contemporaneous accounts and witnesses at trial described the man as Italian in appearance, and there was speculation that the package was being taken for use at an Italian-American celebration of some sort; no great effort was made to identify the owner. Palsgraf's injury was listed in The New York Times as shock; she also suffered bruising. The distance between Helen Palsgraf and the explosion was never made clear in the trial transcript, or in the opinions of the judges who ruled on the case, but the distance from the explosion to the scale was described in the Times as "more than ten feet away" (3 metres). Several days after the incident, she developed a bad stammer, and her doctor testified at trial that it was due to the trauma of the events at East New York station. She had not recovered from the stammer when the case came to court.

=== Trial ===
Palsgraf brought suit against the railroad in the Supreme Court of New York, Kings County, a trial-level court, in Brooklyn on October 2, 1924. The summons was served the following month, and the defendant filed its answer on December 3. The case was heard on May 24 and 25, 1927, with Justice Burt Jay Humphrey presiding. Humphrey had served for over twenty years on the county court in Queens before unexpectedly being nominated for election to the Supreme Court in 1925; he was noted for his courteous and friendly manner. Manhattan lawyers tried the Brooklyn case: Matthew W. Wood, who worked from 233 Broadway (the Woolworth Building) represented Palsgraf, while Joseph F. Keany, whose office was at Pennsylvania Station, was for the railroad, along with William McNamara. Wood was an experienced solo practitioner with two degrees from Ivy League schools; Keany had headed the LIRR's legal department for twenty years—McNamara, who tried the case, was one of the department's junior lawyers, who had advanced from clerk to counsel after graduation from law school. At trial, Palsgraf testified that she had been hit in the side by the scale, and had been treated at the scene, and then took a taxicab home. She testified to trembling then for several days, and then the stammering started. Her health forced her to give up her work in mid-1926. Wood called Herbert Gerhardt, an engraver, who had seen the man with the package hurry towards the train, and whose wife had been hit in the stomach in the man's rush. He testified that the scale had been "blown right to pieces".

On the second day of the trial, Wood called Dr. Karl A. Parshall, Palsgraf's physician. He testified that he had treated Palsgraf occasionally for minor ailments before the incident at East New York, but on the day after found her shaken and bruised. He gave it as his opinion that Palsgraf's ills were caused by the accident. Grace Gerhardt, Herbert's wife, was the next witness. She testified to being hit by one of "the two young Italian fellows" who were racing to make the train, and how one made it unaided and the other only with the help of two LIRR employees. She had nothing to say about the scale or Palsgraf, having seen neither. Elizabeth and Lillian Palsgraf, the elder and younger daughter of the plaintiff, were next to testify and spoke of what they had seen. Wood indicated his only remaining witness was a neurologist, an expert witness, and McNamara for the LIRR moved to dismiss the case on the ground that Palsgraf had failed to present evidence of negligence, but Justice Humphrey denied it. The neurologist, Graeme M. Hammond of Manhattan, had examined Palsgraf two days before, observing her stammering, speaking only with difficulty. She told him of depression and headaches. He diagnosed her with traumatic hysteria, for which the explosion was a plausible cause, and said the hysteria was likely to continue as long as the litigation did, for only once it was resolved were the worries connected with it likely to vanish.

Wood rested his case on behalf of the plaintiff; McNamara offered no evidence but again moved to dismiss, which Humphrey denied. The judge told the all-male jury that if the LIRR employees "omitted to do the things which prudent and careful trainmen do for the safety of those who are boarding their trains, as well as the safety of those who are standing upon the platform waiting for other trains, and that the failure resulted in the plaintiff's injury, then the defendant would be liable." The jury was out for two hours and 35 minutes, including the lunch hour, and they awarded Palsgraf $6,000 ($111,207 in 2025). Pursuant to statute, she also recovered costs of $142 ($2,632 in 2025), an amount added to the verdict. A motion for a new trial was denied on May 27, 1927 by Justice Humphrey, who did not issue a written opinion, and a judgment was entered on the verdict on May 31, from which the LIRR appealed on June 14. Once Palsgraf had gotten her jury verdict, the Gerhardts also sued the railroad, with Wood as their counsel.

William H. Manz, in his article on the facts in Palsgraf, suggested that neither side spent much time preparing for trial. Wood did not contact his fact witnesses, the Gerhardts, until shortly before the trial, and Palsgraf was examined by Dr. Hammond the day before the trial started. McNamara, one of the most junior members of the LIRR's legal team, called no witnesses, and Manz suggested the entire defense strategy was to get the judge to dismiss the case. In his later book, Judge Richard Posner indicated that the much-sued LIRR did not present a better case than the first-time plaintiff: "it put on a bargain-basement defense".

=== Initial appeal ===
The LIRR's appeal took the case to the Appellate Division of the New York Supreme Court, for the Second Department, the state's intermediate appeals court. In its briefs before the Appellate Division, the LIRR argued that the verdict had been contrary to the law and the evidence. It stressed that it had no foreknowledge that the package was dangerous, and that no law required it to search the contents of passenger luggage. The brief stated that given this, there was no negligence in helping a man make a train, and even if there was, that negligence was not the proximate cause of Palsgraf's injuries. Wood, for Palsgraf, argued that the jury verdict finding negligence was supported by undisputed facts, and should not be questioned by the appellate courts. The plaintiff's brief also suggested that the failure of the railroad to call as witnesses the employees who had aided the man should decide any inferences of negligence against it. Wood deemed the trainmen guilty of a "dereliction of duty", misconduct that was the proximate cause of Palsgraf's injuries.

The lawyers argued the case before the Appellate Division in Brooklyn on October 21, 1927. On December 9, the Appellate Division affirmed the trial court's judgment, 3–2. Albert H. F. Seeger wrote the majority opinion for the five justices hearing the case, and was joined by Justices William F. Hagarty and William B. Carswell. Seeger had been born in Stuttgart and came to the United States as a child; he had been elected to the Supreme Court in 1917 and was elevated to the Appellate Division by Governor Al Smith in 1926. Aged 68 at the time of Palsgraf, he could serve only two more years before mandatory retirement. Justice Seeger ruled that the finding of negligence by the jury was supported by the evidence, and speculated that the jury might have found that helping a passenger board a moving train was a negligent act. He wrote that while the set of facts might be novel, the case was no different in principle from well-known court decisions on causation, such as the Squib case, in which an explosive (a squib) was lit and thrown, then was hurled away repeatedly by people not wanting to be hurt until it exploded near the plaintiff, injuring him; his suit against the man who had set the squib in motion was upheld. The majority also focused on the high degree of duty of care that the LIRR owed to Palsgraf, one of its customers.

Presiding Justice Edward Lazansky (joined by Justice J. Addison Young) wrote a dissent. Lazansky, the son of Czech immigrants, had been elected New York Secretary of State as a Democrat in 1910. Elected to the Supreme Court in 1917, he had been designated presiding justice of the Second Department by Governor Smith earlier in 1927. Lazansky did not question the jury finding of negligence, but felt that the employees' conduct was not the proximate cause of Palsgraf's injuries, since the man's conduct in bringing a package that might explode to a crowded passenger station was an independent act of negligence, rendering the neglect by the railroad too remote in causation for there to be liability.

== Court of Appeals ==
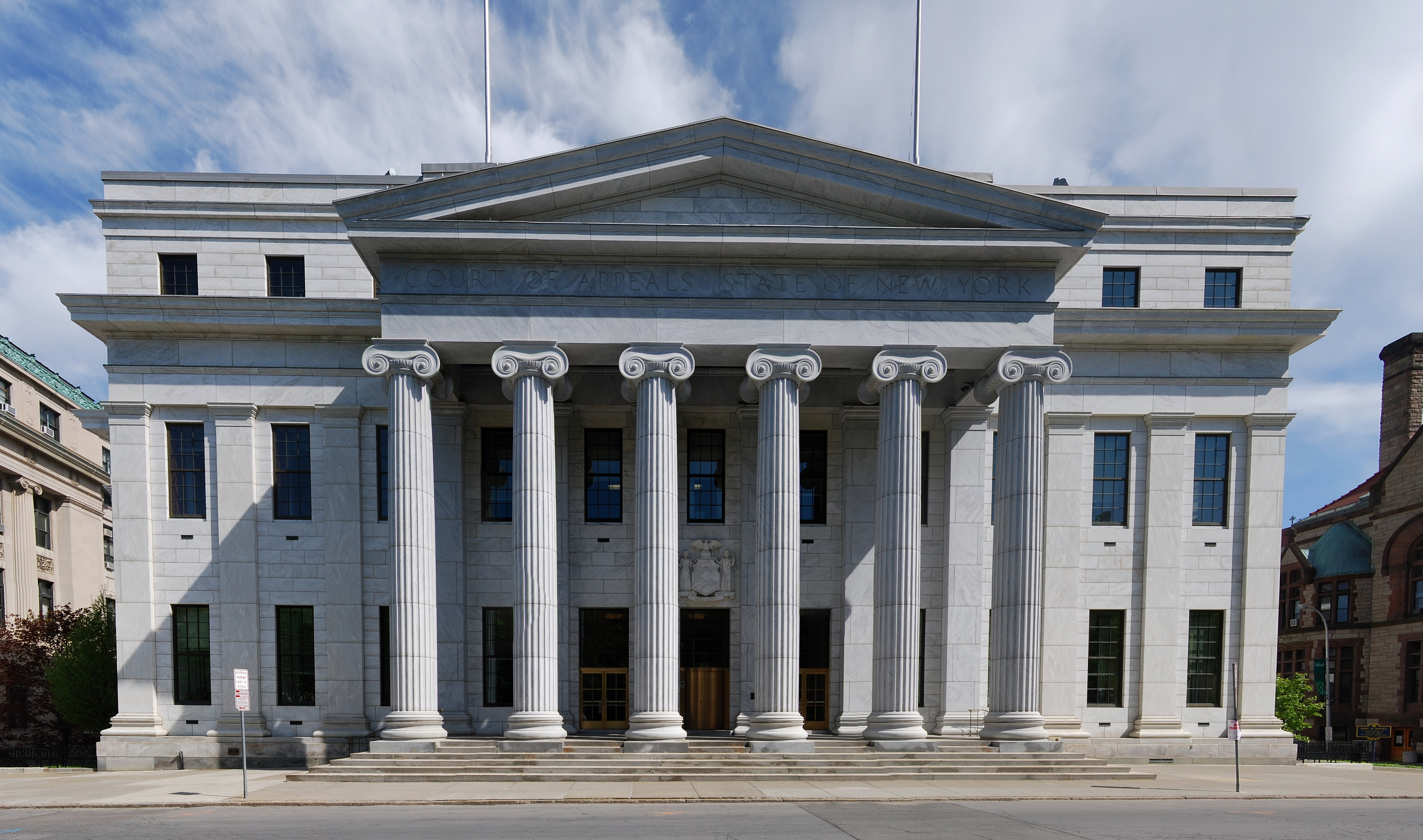
The New York Court of Appeals Building in Albany, where the case was decided

The LIRR was entitled by law to take the case to the New York Court of Appeals (the state's highest court) as there had been a dissent in the Appellate Division, and it did. The railroad argued again that Palsgraf had failed to establish that she had come to harm through the railroad's negligence: that there was no negligence, and even if there was, that neglect had not harmed Palsgraf, since such injury was not "a natural and probable consequence of assisting a man to board a train". Its brief alleged that the trainmen could not have stopped the man from boarding, and once he had flung himself onto the train, had little choice but to help him, "faced with such an emergency they cannot be charged with negligence because they elected to assist the man rather than stand idly by and leave him to his fate." Wood, for his part, argued that negligence had been found by the jury, and by both majority and dissenting justices in the Appellate Division. He wrote that there were many facts from which the jury could have found negligence, including the fact that the train had not shut its doors as it departed (though whether this was to allow latecomers to board or because it was a summer day is uncertain). The case was argued before the Court of Appeals in Albany on February 24, 1928.

=== Cardozo's majority opinion ===
Plaintiff was standing on a platform of defendant's railroad after buying a ticket to go to Rockaway Beach. A train stopped at the station, bound for another place. Two men ran forward to catch it. One of the men reached the platform of the car without mishap, though the train was already moving. The other man, carrying a package, jumped aboard the car, but seemed unsteady as if about to fall. A guard on the car, who had held the door open, reached forward to help him in, and another guard on the platform pushed him from behind. In this act, the package was dislodged, and fell upon the rails. It was a package of small size, about fifteen inches long, and was covered by a newspaper. In fact it contained fireworks, but there was nothing in its appearance to give notice of its contents. The fireworks when they fell exploded. The shock of the explosion threw down some scales at the other end of the platform, many feet away. The scales struck the plaintiff, causing injuries for which she sues.

— Cardozo's statement of facts, Palsgraf v. Long Island Railroad Co., 248 N.Y. at 340–341

The Chief Judge of the Court of Appeals, Benjamin N. Cardozo, was a highly respected judge, who would later become a justice of the U.S. Supreme Court. After a standout legal career, Cardozo had been elected to the trial-level Supreme Court in 1913, but was quickly designated by the governor for service on the Court of Appeals. He was in 1917 appointed a judge of that court, and in 1926 was elected chief judge by the voters. In Palsgraf, Cardozo wrote for a 4–3 majority of the Court of Appeals, reversing the appellate judgment and directing that the case be decided for the defendant, the LIRR. Cardozo was joined by Judges Cuthbert W. Pound, Irving Lehman and Henry Kellogg.

Despite being the longest statement of the facts in any of the four appellate opinions generated by the case, Cardozo's was described by Posner as "elliptical and slanted". It has also been deemed "highly abstract". According to Professor Walter O. Weyrauch in his 1978 journal article, "Cardozo's famous opinion reduced the complicated facts of the case to a bare minimum. Mrs. Palsgraf was transformed into a 'plaintiff' without age, family status, or occupation. The opinion omitted the nature of her injury, the amount of damages that she sought, and the size of the jury award." For example, Cardozo describes Palsgraf (whom he does not name, nor mention her daughters) as standing on the LIRR's platform, rather than waiting for a train, thus downplaying her status as a customer entitled to a high degree of care by the railroad. The explosive package is described as small, though the witnesses had described it as large. The scales are described as being "at the other end of the platform, many feet away" from the explosion, but the record does not support this statement. This characterization may have been based on testimony by Lillian Palsgraf, who had gone to buy a paper from a newsstand "at the other end of the platform", but who was yet close enough to see the package fall. Cardozo's characterization of distance would be challenged by the plaintiff in her motion for reargument, which would be denied with the rejoinder that however close she was to the explosion, she was not so close as to bring her within the zone of foreseeable risk.

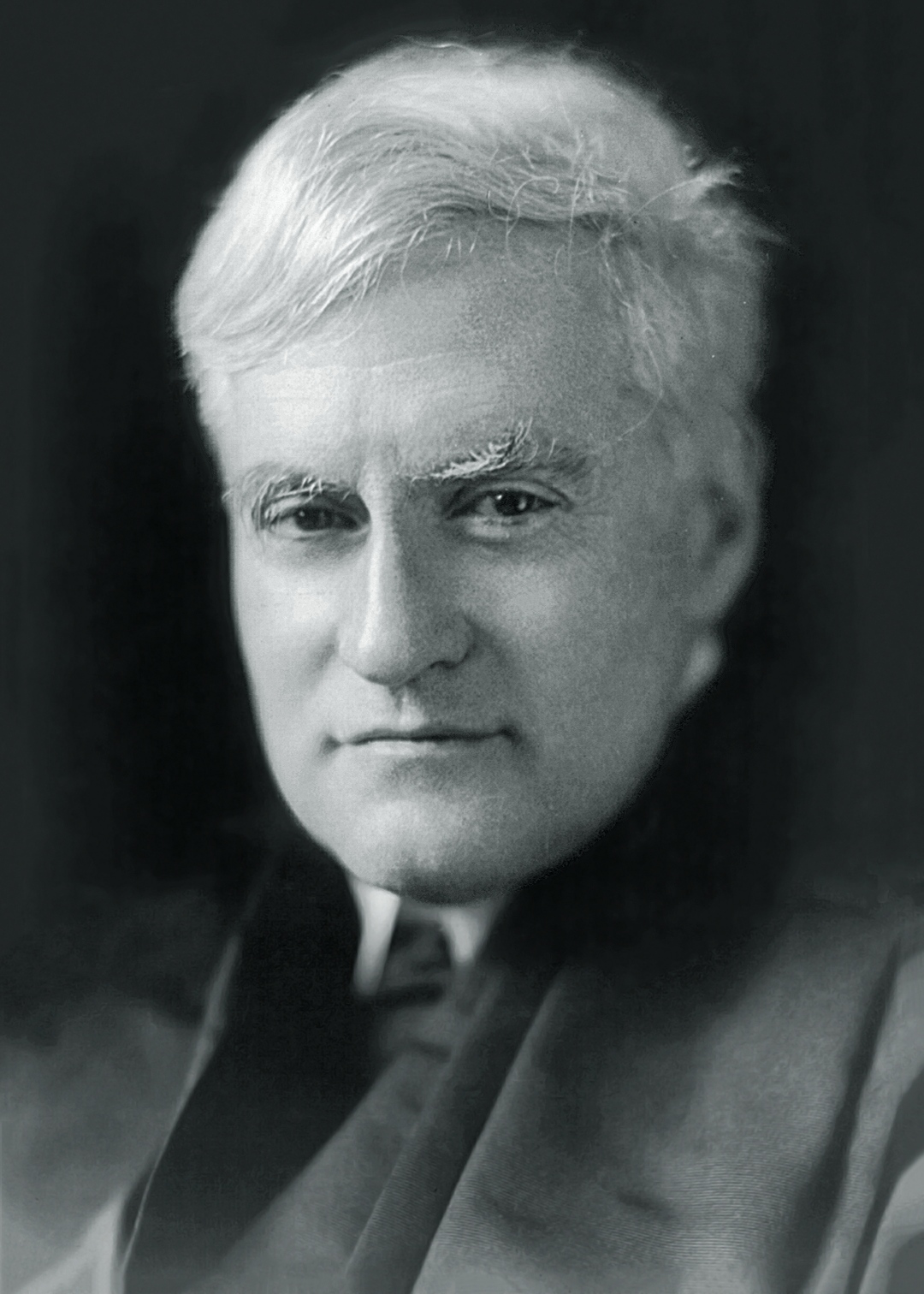
Benjamin N. Cardozo, Chief Judge of the New York Court of Appeals and author of the majority opinion in Palsgraf (pictured in 1932 upon his appointment to the U.S. Supreme Court)

After the fact pattern, Cardozo began his discussion of the law with "the conduct of the defendant's guard, if a wrong in its relation to the holder of the package, was not a wrong in its relation to the plaintiff, standing far away. Relative to her it was not negligence at all." Cardozo quoted Pollock on Torts and cited several cases for the proposition that "proof of negligence in the air, so to speak, will not do." Only if there is a duty to the injured plaintiff, the breach of which causes injury, can there be liability. He defended his decision, "a different conclusion will involve us, and swiftly too, in a maze of contradictions." Cardozo posed hypothetical situations: if a railway guard stumbles over a bundle of newspapers, and there are explosives within, will there be liability to an injured passenger at the other end of the platform? Will the result be different if the object containing the explosives is a valise instead? If there was negligence that day, Cardozo argued, it was only negligence that resulted in the fall and destruction of the package, and there was no wrong done by the railroad to Palsgraf for personal injury, "the diversity of incidents emphasizes the futility of the effort to build the plaintiff's right upon the basis of a wrong to some one else." The chief judge instructed, "The risk reasonably to be perceived defines the duty to be obeyed". Cardozo did not absolve the defendant who knowingly unleashes a destructive force, such as by shooting a gun, just because the bullet takes an unexpected path. This is not such a case, Cardozo held: even if the railway guard had thrown down the package intentionally, without knowing the contents he could not knowingly risk harm to Palsgraf, and would not be liable. Negligence cannot impose liability where an intentional act would not.

Negligence, Cardozo emphasized, derives from human relations, not in the abstract. Negligence that does no one harm is not a tort. It is not enough, he found, to prove negligence by the defendant and damage to the plaintiff; there must be a breach of duty owed to the plaintiff by the defendant. He traced the history of the law of negligence, a concept not known in medieval times, and noted that it evolved as an offshoot of the law of trespass, and one could not sue for trespass to another. Had the railroad been negligent towards Palsgraf, it might have been liable, but "the consequences to be followed must first be rooted in a wrong", and there was no legal wrong done by the railroad to Palsgraf. Thus, the lower courts were incorrect, and must be reversed, and the case dismissed, with Palsgraf to bear the costs of suit.

=== Dissent by Andrews ===
William S. Andrews of Syracuse was a 69-year-old judge, noted for his scholarship, who had been on the Court of Appeals since 1917. The son of Charles Andrews, a former Chief Judge of the Court of Appeals, William Andrews is best remembered today because he wrote an opinion in Palsgraf. In that dissent, he was joined by Judges Frederick E. Crane and John F. O'Brien. Andrews began with a brief recitation of facts: that a railroad employee had negligently dislodged the package, the contents of which the trainman was unaware, and the subsequent explosion broke the scale and injured the plaintiff, "an intending passenger". Andrews noted the fundamental difference among the judges concerning the law of negligence: whether there must be a duty to the plaintiff, the breach of which injured her, and whether, when there is an act that is a threat to the safety of others, the doer of it should be "liable for all its proximate consequences, even where they result in injury to one who would generally be thought to be outside the radius of danger". Andrews believed that if there was a negligent act, the proximate cause of injury to the plaintiff, that should establish liability.

Andrews found Cardozo's reasoning too narrow, and felt that the focus should be on the unreasonable act: driving down Broadway at high speed is negligent whether or not an accident occurs. Such an act is wrong to the public at large, not only to those who might be injured. "Due care is a duty imposed on each one of us to protect society from unnecessary danger, not to protect A, B or C alone ... In an empty world, negligence would not exist. It does involve a relationship between man and his fellows. But not merely a relationship between man and those whom he might reasonably expect his act would injure. Rather, a relationship between him and those whom he does in fact injure. If his act has a tendency to harm some one, it harms him a mile away as surely as it does those on the scene."

Andrews pointed out that the law allows plaintiffs to recover from defendants who had no duty towards them: orphans may recover for their negligently killed parents; a bereaved person may recover for negligence in the death of a spouse. An insurance company may sue in subrogation and recover the sum paid out from the person who started the fire. "Behind the cloud of words is the fact they hide, that the act, wrongful as to the insured, has also harmed the company."

An event may have many causes, Andrews noted, and only some may be deemed proximate. Liability for negligence may only be found where that proximate cause exists, a term that the judge admitted was inexact. He suggested the analogy of a river, made up of water from many sources, and by the time it wound to sea, fully intermixed. But for a time, after water from a muddy swamp or a clay bed joins, its origin may be traced. Beyond a certain point, it cannot be traced, and such is proximate cause, "because of convenience, of public policy, of a rough sense of justice, the law arbitrarily declines to trace a series of events beyond a certain point. This is not logic. It is practical politics."

That point, beyond which there is no proximate cause, is drawn differently by different judges, and by different courts, Andrews explained. He listed factors that courts might consider, such as remoteness in time or space, and discussed some hypotheticals, such as a chauffeur who causes an accident, the noise of which startles a nursemaid into dropping a child, then returned to the case being decided,

Mrs. Palsgraf was standing some distance away. How far cannot be told from the record—apparently twenty-five or thirty feet. Perhaps less. Except for the explosion, she would not have been injured. We are told by the appellant in his brief "it cannot be denied that the explosion was the direct cause of the plaintiff's injuries." So it was a substantial factor in producing the result—there was here a natural and continuous sequence—direct connection. The only intervening cause was that instead of blowing her to the ground the concussion smashed the weighing machine which in turn fell upon her. There was no remoteness in time, little in space. And surely, given such an explosion as here it needed no great foresight to predict that the natural result would be to injure one on the platform at no greater distance from its scene than was the plaintiff. Just how no one might be able to predict. Whether by flying fragments, by broken glass, by wreckage of machines or structures no one could say. But injury in some form was most probable.

Given that, Andrews concluded, the jury verdict should be upheld. "Under these circumstances I cannot say as a matter of law that the plaintiff's injuries were not the proximate result of the negligence. That is all we have before us."

== Subsequent events ==
Wood, Palsgraf's lawyer, moved the Court of Appeals to allow reargument of the case, alleging that Cardozo had confused the position of Palsgraf with that of her daughter Lillian (at the newsstand), and complained about the chief judge's use of such terms as "distant" and "far away". Wood warned that the decision could have far-reaching adverse effects on innocent passengers. The court denied the motion with a one-sentence statement likely written by Cardozo, "If we assume that the plaintiff was nearer the scene of the explosion than the prevailing opinion would suggest, she was not so near that injury from a falling package, not known to contain explosives, would be within the range of reasonable prevision." Costs of $559.60 ($10,493 in 2025) were due from Palsgraf to the railroad under Cardozo's order. Posner doubted the sum was ever collected, noting that Palsgraf's family spoke to legal scholars and periodicals about the case in later years, and never mentioned an attempt to collect what would have been about a year's salary for the disabled former janitor.

Helen Palsgraf remained embittered about the loss of her case. She became mute, and developed other health problems prior to her death on October 27, 1945, at the age of 61. At the time of her death, Palsgraf was living in Richmond Hill, Queens with her daughter Elizabeth. Her former attorney, Wood, maintained a law office in the Woolworth Building until his death in 1972 at age 96. His opposing trial counsel, McNamara, remained with the LIRR's legal department until his retirement in 1959, while McNamara's superior and counsel of record, Keany, continued as the railroad's general solicitor until he died in 1935. Justice Humphrey retired in 1936, a year after he gained notoriety for presiding over the marriage of heiress Doris Duke; he died in 1940. Andrews retired at the end of 1928, having reached the mandatory retirement age of 70; he died in 1936. Cardozo was appointed to the U.S. Supreme Court in 1932 by President Herbert Hoover and served there until his death in 1938.

After the Palsgraf case became prominent among lawyers, having been taught to many of them in law school, members of the family sometimes encountered startled reactions when lawyers learned their last name. Frank Palsgraf, Helen's grandson, told in 1978 of "being treated like a celebrity" by a prosecutor when called for jury duty, and causing the judge to reminisce about hard nights studying the case in law school. Nevertheless, the prosecutor struck him from the jury. According to Posner, the later coverage of the family "makes it clear that, with the exception of Mrs. Palsgraf, the Palsgraf family was thrilled by its association with a famous case, notwithstanding the outcome". In 1991, that association became closer, as Lisa Newell, first cousin four times removed of Judge Cardozo, married Palsgraf's great-grandson, J. Scott Garvey.

== Prominence ==
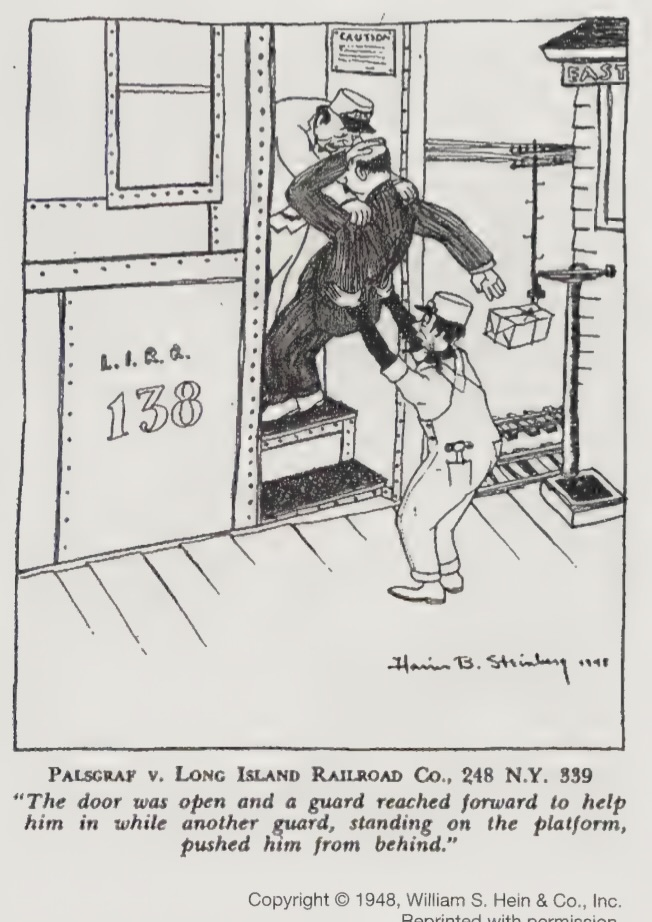
Cartoon depicting the events of Palsgraf, from a 1948 casebook

Palsgraf came to the attention of the legal world quickly. William L. Prosser of the University of California Law School wrote that the Appellate Division's decision fell into the hands of Francis H. Bohlen of the University of Pennsylvania Law School. Bohlen was at that time the reporter compiling the first Restatement of Torts for the American Law Institute (ALI), and Cardozo was informally one of the advisers. In that task, Bohlen was having difficulty dealing with the concept of duty of care in negligence, especially involving unforeseeable plaintiffs, and Prosser related that Cardozo was treated to a learned discussion by the other advisers of a case that might come before his court and, convinced by the arguments, used them to decide Palsgraf. Kaufman doubted this story, which was told to Prosser by Dean Young B. Smith of Columbia, noting that the only meeting of the advisers between the two appeal decisions in Palsgraf took place in New York on December 12–13, 1927, beginning only three days after the Appellate Division ruled, and the notes reveal that Cardozo was absent; the chief judge was hearing arguments all that week in Albany. Nevertheless, the discussions and materials from the Restatement compilation likely influenced Cardozo in his decision.

Bohlen dwelt heavily upon Cardozo's opinion in Palsgraf in presenting the Tentative Draft of the Restatement to the ALI's annual meeting, which approved the section citing Palsgraf with little discussion. (Note: There is a legend that the ALI had a lengthy discussion over Section 165 of the Restatement, which relies on Palsgraf, and that Bohlen's position was upheld by a single vote. Prosser stated that the notes of the meeting indicate that Section 165 was approved without discussion. See Prosser, p. 8 n.27) Palsgraf quickly became well known in the legal community, and was cited in many cases, some of dubious relevance. According to Kaufman, "the bizarre facts, Cardozo's spin on the legal issue, the case's timing in relation to the Restatement project, its adaptability for law-school teaching, the policy-oriented dissent by Andrews, Cardozo's rhetoric, and Cardozo's name—all these factors combined to make Palsgraf a legal landmark." According to Prosser, writing in his hornbook for law students, "what the Palsgraf case actually did was submit to the nation's most excellent state court a law professor's dream of an examination question". But Professor (later Judge) John T. Noonan saw more than this, noting that Cardozo was then the nation's most prominent state-court judge: "The excitement of Palsgraf was not merely that it was a brilliant examination question; it was an examination question answered by Cardozo."

The first mentions of Palsgraf in law reviews were case notes written by law students, appearing over the course of the year following the decision by the Court of Appeals. Professor Robert L. Goodhart, in the Yale Law Journal in 1930, was at the front of an avalanche of commentary to such an extent that by 1938, Louisiana State University professor Thomas A. Cowan deemed Palsgraf "a legal institution". The case entered the standard legal casebooks, from which law students learn, in the early 1930s, usually to illustrate the necessary connection between defendant's misconduct and plaintiff's injury in negligence cases. According to Posner, writing in 1990, "Palsgraf is now the subject of a large scholarly literature, and is, I believe, the only case reprinted in all American casebooks on tort law." Manz wrote, "everyone who has sat in an American law school torts class can recall the basic facts—the crowded railroad platform, the running men, the dropped package, the explosion, and the falling scale. Palsgraf has become a sort of legal 'urban legend'—an allegedly true, but improbable, tale told and retold to each new class of law students." Professor W. Jonathan Cardi noted, "in law school classrooms, 'Palsgraf Day' is often celebrated with food and drink, dramatic reenactments, interpretive poems, and even mock duels between Judges Cardozo and Andrews".

Palsgraf was soon adopted by some state courts, at times in different contexts: Though some state courts outside New York approved it, others did not, sometimes feeling that foreseeability was an issue for the jury to consider. According to Posner, writing in 1990, Cardozo's holding that there is no liability to a plaintiff who could not have been foreseen "has been followed by a number of states besides New York, but it remains the minority rule. Most states continue to muddle along with the nebulous 'proximate cause' approach, which emphasizes the proximity in time and space of the defendant's careless act to the plaintiff's injury; that was the approach taken by Judge Andrews's dissent in Palsgraf."

The overwhelming majority of state courts accept that there must be a duty of care for there to be liability: the courts of Wisconsin, though, have stated that they have adopted Andrews' approach, and impose liability when there was a duty to any person, whether or not that person is the plaintiff. The Restatement (Second) of Torts (1965) amended the earlier formulation only slightly, but the third Restatement (2009), takes an approach closer to that of Andrews in focusing on whether the defendant engaged in an activity that carried a risk of harm to another (not necessarily the plaintiff), and on whether the defendant exercised reasonable care. The new formulation makes foreseeability, or the scope of the risk, not a hurdle that must be overcome, as in Palsgraf, but a factor to be weighed with others when determining whether there was negligence. Thus, according to law professor David Owen in his 2009 article, "the Restatement (Third) discards Judge Cardozo's elemental work in Palsgraf so long ago. And ... also rejects Judge Andrew's [sic] valuable insight that juries should be offered a wide range of fairness factors, beginning with foreseeability, in figuring how far responsibility should extend".

== Discussion ==
According to Posner, "Cardozo's 'bottom line' is that there is no liability to an unforeseeable plaintiff". Don Herzog, in his 2017 book, deemed the Palsgraf principle to mean that "if anyone was wronged here, it was the man with the parcel. The guards' wronging him happened to harm Mrs. Palsgraf. But that doesn't mean they wronged Mrs. Palsgraf. And if they didn't wrong her, she can't conceivably prevail in a tort action. Cardozo is not thinking that if he were on the jury, he wouldn't find the railroad liable. He is saying it was a legal error to let the jury finding stand." This is because "the crucial fact for Cardozo is that the parcel of explosives was unmarked. So reasonably careful conductors worry only that if they make it fall, it will break ... They have no reason to worry about the welfare of Mrs. Palsgraf."

Cardozo has been praised for his style of writing in Palsgraf. Posner noted that in the facts of the case Cardozo "saw instantiated the basic principles of negligence law and was able to articulate them in prose of striking freshness, clarity, and vividness", in an opinion mostly written in short sentences and lacking footnotes or block quotes. University of Pennsylvania Law School Professor Kim Lane Scheppele noted that the opinion was "written by Judge Benjamin Cardozo at the height of his formidable powers". Richard Polenberg, in his study of that jurist, stated, "Cardozo had a genius for making it seem that the results he reached were logical, inevitable, and legally unassailable". Prosser stated, "with due respect to the superlative style in which both [Cardozo's and Andrews' opinions] are written, neither of them wears well on long acquaintance. Both of them beg the question shamelessly, stating dogmatic propositions without reason or explanation." Herzog was also less enthusiastic, noting that "the majority opinion is unfortunately written in the curious idiolect I sometimes call Cardozo-speak."

From its early days, there has been criticism of Palsgraf, and more recently, of Cardozo for authoring it. Cowan, writing in 1938, described its holding as limited to its facts, that given the identical circumstances recurring, the railroad would breach no duty to the new plaintiff by assisting a man with such a package in boarding. Prosser in his 1953 article wondered "how can any rule as to the 'scope of the risk' evolved from two guards, a package of fireworks and a scale aid in the slightest degree in the solution of this question? Is it proper, in Palsgraf itself, so utterly to ignore the fact that the plaintiff was a passenger[?] ... until the question is decided, is Palsgraf really definite authority even for Palsgraf ?"

Noonan's 1976 book chronicled the unwillingness by legal scholars to utilize the "multitude of legal facts not mentioned by Cardozo and Andrews", even though the lower-court record in Palsgraf was reproduced in a civil procedure casebook in the 1950s. Noonan criticized Cardozo for not taking Palsgraf's circumstances into account when making his decision, and listed factors that may have influenced Cardozo against the plaintiff, including that he was a lifelong bachelor who did not have Palsgraf's experience of caring for children, and he may have frowned upon Wood's representation of Palsgraf (likely on a contingent fee, something not favored at the time). Posner, writing in 1990, disagreed with Noonan and with feminist critics following him, noting that judges take an oath to do equal justice to rich and poor, "so the fact that Mrs. Palsgraf was poor would not have been a principled ground for bending the rules in her favor". Noonan had considered unjust the award of court costs against Palsgraf, and in her 2016 book, law professor Cathleen Kaveny agreed, "the penalty imposed on Palsgraf for seeking justice through the courts was to deprive her, a single mother, of the ability to support her children ... All judges, however can develop empathy. And in telling the story of Helen Palsgraf, Judge Noonan makes a good case for why they should."

In 2011, Cardi analyzed the present-day influence that Palsgraf has had on state courts. He found that neither Cardozo nor Andrews has won on the question of how duty of care is formulated, with courts applying policy analyses. "As to the proper doctrinal home for plaintiff-foreseeability, Cardozo has undoubtedly prevailed. Although a clear majority of jurisdictions state that duty is the proper home for plaintiff-foreseeability, Cardozo's vision of foreseeability as a categorical determination has not been widely adopted." But, he noted, "Andrews may have found a back door to victory. Arguably the most important consequence of the Palsgraf decision, the resolution of the judge/jury question, appears to lean in Andrews' direction. A majority of courts prefer to leave foreseeability—even as a part of duty—to the jury."

Scheppele put Palsgraf in social context, noting that 108 passengers were killed in railroad operations on the LIRR in 1924, a typical figure for it in the 1920s.

Social scientists of a more qualitative and historical bent would see the Palsgraf case as part of a long history in which the railroad industry imposed substantial costs on the broader society, costs that were never added to the ledgers of the railroads. Most train accidents were not litigated. Those that were shared the fate of Mrs. Palsgraf's: each case was taken on its own facts as an isolated, freak occurrence, and the broader consequence, in which death and injury became a normal byproduct of running the railroad, was disregarded. If judges could see—if not through statistics, then perhaps through the social history of the railroad industry—just how dangerous trains were and how much death and destruction they left in their path, they may have been less inclined to think that Mrs. Palsgraf's problem was that those two men carried fireworks onto the platform that day.

== Sources ==
=== Primary ===
- Record in Palsgraf v. Long Island Railroad Co (PDF). 1928.

=== Books and journals ===
- Cardi, W. Jonathan (2011). "The Hidden Legacy of Palsgraf: Modern Duty Law in Microcosm" (PDF). Boston University Law Review: 1873–1913. Archived from the original (PDF) on August 10, 2017.
- Herzog, Don (2017). Defaming the Dead. New Haven, Connecticut: Yale University Press. ISBN 978-0-300-22771-0.
- Kaufman, Andrew (1998). Cardozo. Cambridge, Massachusetts: Harvard University Press. ISBN 978-0-674-09645-5.
- Kaveny, Cathleen (2016). A Culture of Engagement: Law, Religion, and Morality. Washington, D.C.: Georgetown University Press. ISBN 978-1-62616-303-4.
- Little, Joseph W. (2007). "Palsgraf Revisited (Again)". Pierce Law Review. 6 (1): 75–110.
- Manz, William H. (Spring 2003). "Palsgraf: Cardozo's Urban Legend?". Dickinson Law Journal. 107: 785–844.
- Mars, David (September 1959). "Justice Benjamin Nathan Cardozo: His Life and Character". Publications of the American Jewish Historical Society. 49 (1): 5–15. JSTOR 43059078.
- Noonan, John T. (2002) [1976]. Persons and Masks of the Law: Cardozo, Holmes, Jefferson, and Wythe as Makers of the Masks (reprint ed.). Berkeley, California: University of California Press. ISBN 978-0-520-23523-6.
- Owen, David (2009). "Figuring Foreseeability". Wake Forest Law Review. 44: 1277–1308.
- Polenberg, Richard (1997). The World of Benjamin Cardozo. Cambridge, Massachusetts: Harvard University Press. ISBN 978-0-674-96051-0.
- Posner, Richard A. (1993) [1990]. Cardozo: A Study in Reputation (paperback ed.). Chicago: University of Chicago Press. ISBN 978-0-226-67556-5.
- Prosser, William L. (November 1953). "Palsgraf Revisited". Michigan Law Review. 52 (1): 1–32. doi:10.2307/1285361. JSTOR 1285361.
- Scheppele, Kim Lane (June 2003). "Cultures of Facts". Perspectives on Politics. 1 (2): 363–368. doi:10.1017/S153759270300029X. JSTOR 3688909. S2CID 143781471.
- Weyrauch, Walter Otto (July 1978). "Law as Mask. Legal Ritual and Relevance". California Law Review. 66 (4): 699–726. doi:10.2307/3479965. JSTOR 3479965.
