= Meinhard v. Salmon =

1928 N.Y. Court of Appeals case

Coordinates: 40°45′14″N 73°58′53″W

- Court: New York Court of Appeals
- Full case name: Morton H. Meinhard v. Walter J. Salmon et al.
- Argued: December 4 1928
- Decided: December 31 1928
- Citations: 249 N.Y. 458; 164 N.E. 545; 1928 N.Y. LEXIS 830; 62 A.L.R. 1

Case history
- Prior history: Judgment for plaintiff, New York County Supreme Court; affirmed as modified, 229 N.Y.S. 345 (N.Y. App. Div. 1928)

Holding
- Managing partner in a joint venture had a fiduciary duty to inform and allow the investing partner to compete to obtain an opportunity that arose from his status as a partner even though it would vest after the partnership's anticipated termination. New York Supreme Court Appellate Division affirmed as modified.

Court membership
- Chief judge: Benjamin Cardozo
- Associate judges: Cuthbert Pound, William S. Andrews, Frederick Crane, Irving Lehman, Henry Kellogg, John F. O'Brien

Case opinions
- Majority: Cardozo, joined by Pound, Crane, Lehman
- Dissent: Andrews, joined by Kellogg, O'Brien

Meinhard v. Salmon, 164 N.E. 545 (N.Y. 1928), is a widely cited case in which the New York Court of Appeals held that partners in a business owe fiduciary duties to one another where a business opportunity arises during the course of the partnership. The court holds that the fiduciary duty of communication was breached where a partner in a joint venture failed to inform his co-partner of a profitable opportunity that was offered by a third-party who was ignorant of the partnership. Furthermore, the duty of loyalty was breached where the partner appropriated to himself a benefit arising from his status as a partner without allowing his co-partner an opportunity to compete. This holding relates to the doctrine of corporate opportunity.

== Facts ==
Meinhard claimed that his former business partner, Salmon, had violated a fiduciary duty by taking an opportunity to renew a lease in his own name without sharing the benefits. In 1902, Salmon bought a 20-year lease for the Hotel Bristol, owned by Elbridge Thomas Gerry, at 5th Avenue and 42nd Street in New York. Salmon wished to convert the hotel into shops and offices. To raise money, he entered a joint venture with Meinhard. They put the terms of their relationship in writing. Meinhard provided the investment capital while Salmon managed the business. The first five years, Meinhard would receive 40% of the profits and 50% every year after until the twentieth year. Meinhard was given the sole power to assign the lease during the term of the venture. The venture was created to terminate at the end of the lease.

After 20 years, as the lease was expiring and the joint venture coming to an end, the owner of the reversion of the lease, Gerry, approached Salmon to negotiate a substantial redevelopment of the property. Gerry was ignorant of the partnership. The terms of the new lease contemplated destruction of the then-existing buildings after a period of seven years followed by reconstruction. Salmon resigned the lease in his individual capacity without telling Meinhard. When Meinhard found out, he sued. Meinhard argued the new opportunity belonged to the joint venture and sued to have the lease transferred to a constructive trust. Salmon argued any interest in the new lease could not belong to the joint venture since both parties expected the venture to terminate when the first lease expired.

A referee agreed the opportunity belonged to the joint venture, and awarded Meinhard a 25% interest (based on Meinhard's half interest in half the property). The Appellate Division ratcheted it up to 50%. Salmon appealed from that decision.

== Judgment ==
While it lowered the plaintiff's award to 49%, the court affirmed the decision. It held that Salmon, as the managing partner, owed Meinhard, as the investing partner, a fiduciary duty, and that this included a duty to inform Meinhard of the new leasing opportunity. Joint venturers owe each other the highest duty of loyalty and Salmon, as managing partner has assumed a responsibility by which Meinhard must rely on him to manage the partnership. As Chief Judge Benjamin Cardozo said,

A trustee is held to something stricter than the morals of the market place. Not honesty alone, but the punctilio of an honor the most sensitive, is then the standard of behavior… the level of conduct for fiduciaries [has] been kept at a level higher than that trodden by the crowd.

The court further held that Salmon was an agent for the joint venture. The court determined the new business opportunity — which was made available to Salmon because during the course of his agency, or management of the venture — Salmon was obligated to act as a fiduciary of the venture in the transaction. Specifically, the court held that he was obligated by the fiduciary duty of communication to notify the venture of profits obtained during the course of his agency. The court held that he was obligated by the duty of loyalty to share the profits with the venture. Alternatively, the court holds that he was required to inform Meinhard of the opportunity and allow him an opportunity to compete for the lease.

This decision extended the duties of partnership far beyond duties under a contract. Contractual duties among merchants do not typically extend beyond the duty of good-faith. However, the court held that a joint venture created a fiduciary relationship in which each member is bound to a higher standard. It determined that in such a relationship, loyalty must be undivided and unselfish, and that a breach of fiduciary duty can occur by something less than fraud or intentional bad-faith. The court noted that Salmon did not maliciously appropriate to himself the benefits of the partnership. The court observed that, by contract, Salmon was simply exercising his sole ability to execute a lease and may have assumed that he owed no further duty. Nonetheless, the court ruled in favor of Meinhard.

=== Andrews' dissent ===
A three-judge dissent, written by Judge Andrews, contended that any duty following from the partnership ended at the end of the twenty-year period; because the partnership was created to manage the building for the twenty-year term, the dissent felt that deals involving events to occur after the expiration of that term were of no matter to the partnership.

== Significance ==
The case is considered a landmark case of partnership law, and has since come to be reproduced or at least discussed in virtually every American casebook on the subject.

== Aftermath ==
Initially, Salmon was unhappy about the decision. But when the Great Depression began shortly after the decision, Salmon came to view his loss as a surprise victory. Since Meinhard was now a half owner in the joint enterprise, he was not only entitled to half of the profits but also required to pay half of the losses. During much of the Great Depression, this property lost money. Salmon's finances were thus assisted by Meinhard's financial contributions.

== See also ==
- US trusts law
- United States corporate law
- Beatty v Guggenheim Exploration Co (1919) 225 NY 380
- Duty of loyalty
- English trusts law
