= Harpending =

Harpending is a surname. Notable people with the surname include:

- Abraham V. Harpending (1816–1871), American lawyer and politician
- Asbury Harpending (1839–1923), American adventurer and financier
- Henry Harpending (1944–2016), American anthropologist and professor
