= William Shankland Andrews =

American judge (1858–1936)

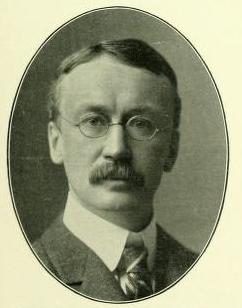
- William Shankland Andrews in 1903

Associate Judge of the New York Court of Appeals
- In office 1921–1928

Justice of the New York Supreme Court
- In office 1900–1921

Personal details
- Born: September 25, 1858
- Died: August 5, 1936 (aged 77) Syracuse, New York, U.S.
- Party: Republican
- Spouse: Mary Raymond Shipman (m. 1884)
- Children: 1
- Parents: Charles Andrews; Marcia A. Shankland
- Education: Harvard University; Columbia University (JD)

William Shankland Andrews (September 25, 1858 – August 5, 1936) was an American lawyer and judge from New York.

== Early life and education ==
William Shankland Andrews was born on September 25, 1858. He was the son of New York Appellate Judge Charles Andrews, the husband of Mary Raymond Shipman, and the great-grandfather of Nancy Andrews, an American biologist. After completing studies at St. John's Academy, Manlius, New York, where he was Head Boy in 1872, Andrews graduated from Harvard College in 1880, received his Juris Doctor degree from Columbia Law School in 1882.

== Career ==
Andrews returned to Syracuse, where he joined the firm Knapp, Nottingham & Andrews, working there until 1899, when he was nominated by the Republican Party to serve as the New York Supreme Court Justice in the 5th Judicial District.

He was a justice of the New York Supreme Court from 1900 to 1921. In 1921, he was designated by Governor Charles S. Whitman a judge of the New York Court of Appeals, after the death of Emory A. Chase. In 1921, he was elected to a regular seat. He dissented from several opinions by noted fellow judge Benjamin Cardozo. These included dissents in Palsgraf v. Long Island Railroad Co. and Meinhard v. Salmon, both cases in which Andrews expressed a sharply different philosophy of the responsibilities people owe to one another. Andrews retired from the bench at the end of 1928, when he reached the constitutional age limit of 70 years.

== Personal life ==
He married Mary Raymond Shipman in 1884. He and his wife had one child, Paul Shipman Andrews, who was the Dean of Syracuse University College of Law from 1927 to 1952. Paul Andrews had two sons: Rev. Nigel Lyon Andrews and William Shankland Andrews II. William Shankland Andrews II was a lawyer. Nigel Andrews was a clerk to New York Court of Appeals Judge, Edmund Lewis. He was the great-grandfather of Nancy Andrews, an American biologist.

== Death ==
On August 5, 1936 Andrews died after falling from his bed, just three days after the death of his wife, Mary.
