= 1882 New York state election =

- November 7, 1882

The 1882 New York state election was held on November 7, 1882, to elect the governor, the lieutenant governor, the chief judge and a U.S. Representative-at-large, as well as all members of the New York State Assembly. Besides, two constitutional amendments were proposed – the abolition of tolls on the State canals, and to increase the number of justices on the New York Supreme Court – and were accepted by the electorate.

== History ==
The Greenback state convention met on July 19 at Albany, New York. Epenetus Howe was nominated for governor, James Allen for lieutenant governor, Lawrence J. McParlin for chief judge, and L. G. McDonald for U.S. Representative-at-large.

The Prohibition state convention met on September 20 at Rochester, New York. Rev. T. J. Bossell was president. Alphonso A. Hopkins was nominated for governor, William H. Boole, of Kings County, for lieutenant governor; C. A. Hammond, of Onondaga County, for chief judge; and L. S. Freeman, of Niagara County, for U.S. Representative-at-large.

The Republican state convention met on September 20 at Saratoga Springs, New York. There were two opposing factions in the party: the Half-Breeds led by Governor Alonzo B. Cornell, and the Stalwarts led by Ex-U.S. Senators Roscoe Conkling and Thomas C. Platt in league with railroad magnate Jay Gould. The State Committee met at 9 o'clock at Congress Hall and elected Edward M. Madden to be temporary chairman of the convention (vote Madden (St.) 18, Edmund L. Pitts (H.-B.) 14). The convention opened at half past 10 at Town Hall. The roll was called by John W. Vrooman, the Clerk of the New York State Senate. When Madden was proposed for temporary chairman, the Half-Breeds objected and proposed Pitts, and a vote was taken. Madden received 251, Pitts 243, showing an almost evenly divided convention with a slight Stalwart majority. U.S. Secretary of the Treasury Charles J. Folger (St.) was nominated for governor on the second ballot (first ballot: Folger 223, Cornell [incumbent] 180, James W. Wadsworth 69, John H. Starin 19, John C. Robinson 6; second ballot: Folger 257, Cornell 222, Wadsworth 18). B. Platt Carpenter (St.), the Chairman of the State Committee, was nominated for lieutenant governor; and A. Barton Hepburn for U.S. Representative-at-large. The incumbent Chief Judge Charles Andrews was nominated to succeed himself. Hepburn declined to run, and the State Committee substituted Howard Carroll, of New York City, on the ticket at a meeting on October 10 at the Fifth Avenue Hotel in New York City (first ballot: Carroll 14, Ferris Jacobs, Jr. 7, Corp. James Tanner 6, John A. King 1; second ballot: Carroll 28).

The Democratic state convention met on September 22 at Shakespeare Hall in Syracuse, New York. The Tammany delegates were admitted again, and the rift in the Party was bridged over. David B. Hill was nominated for lieutenant governor by acclamation. William C. Ruger was nominated for chief judge on the first ballot (vote: Ruger 210, Rufus W. Peckham, Jr. 163, Augustus Schoonmaker, Jr. 1).

== Result ==
The whole Democratic ticket was elected.

The incumbent Andrews was defeated.

84 Democrats, 42 Republicans and 2 Independents were elected for the session of 1883 to the New York State Assembly.

1882 state election results
Office	Democratic ticket		Republican ticket		Prohibition ticket		Greenback ticket	
Governor	Grover Cleveland	535,318	Charles J. Folger	342,464	Alphonso A. Hopkins	25,783	Epenetus Howe	11,974
Lieutenant Governor	David B. Hill	534,629	B. Platt Carpenter	337,494	William H. Boole		James Allen	
Chief Judge	William C. Ruger	482,822	Charles Andrews	409,422	C. A. Hammond	16,234	Lawrence J. McParlin	10,527
U.S. Representative-at-large	Henry W. Slocum	503,394	Howard Carroll	394,232	L. S. Freeman		L. G. McDonald	

== See also ==
- New York gubernatorial elections

== Sources ==
- Result (lacking a few counties' returns): COMPLETE VOTE FOR STATE OFFICERS AS CANVASSED BY THE COUNTY SUPERVISORS in NYT on November 25, 1882
- Result for Governor and Judge: THE NOVEMBER ELECTIONS in NYT on November 5, 1883 (recalling the previous result)
- Result The Tribune Almanac 1883
