= 1884 New York state election =

- November 4, 1884

The 1884 New York state election was held on November 4, 1884, to elect two judges of the New York Court of Appeals, as well as all members of the New York State Assembly.

== History ==
In 1884, the terms of the only two remaining original judges of the re-organized Court of Appeals expired. These were the only state officers to be elected statewide this year.

The Democratic state convention met on June 18 at Saratoga Springs, New York. William E. Smith, of Clinton County, was Temporary Chairman and President. Democrat Charles A. Rapallo and Republican Charles Andrews were nominated for judges after a viva voce vote almost unanimously, thus endorsing the resolution of the Republican convention that "the Court of Appeals should be removed from politics."

The Greenback-Labor state convention met on August 30 at Masonic Hall in New York City. H. Alden Spencer was Temporary Chairman until the choice of George O. Jones as President. Prof. Isaac L. Rice, of New York City, and Patrick H. Cowen, of Saratoga County, were nominated for judges of the Court of Appeals.

== Result ==
The jointly nominated incumbents Rapallo and Andrews were re-elected.

1884 state election results
Office	Democratic ticket		Republican ticket	Prohibition ticket		Greenback ticket	
Judge of the Court of Appeals	Charles A. Rapallo	1,089,414	Charles A. Rapallo	Walter Farrington	23,150	Isaac L. Rice	6,527
Judge of the Court of Appeals	Charles Andrews	1,089,396	Charles Andrews	Virgil A. Willard	22,881	Patrick H. Cowen	6,870

== See also ==
- New York state elections

== Sources ==
- Result in New York City: OFFICIAL VOTE OF THE COUNTY in NYT on November 20, 1884
- Result: THE OFFICIAL CANVAS IN NEW-YORK STATE DECLARED in NYT on November 27, 1884 (Subscription required)
- Result: DEATH OF JUDGE RAPALLO in NYT on December 29, 1887
- Result: The Tribune Almanac 1885
