= 1890 New York state election =

- November 4, 1890

The 1890 New York state election was held on November 4, 1890, to elect a judge of the New York Court of Appeals, as well as all members of the New York State Assembly.

== History ==
In 1890, there was only one state officer to be elected statewide: a judge of the Court of Appeals, to succeed Robert Earl whose fourteen-year term would expire at the end of the year.

The Republican State Committee met on September 2 at the Fifth Avenue Hotel in New York City. The incumbent Democrat Robert Earl was nominated to succeed himself on the first ballot (vote: Earl 21, Daniel G. Rollins 3).

The Democratic State Committee met on September 23 at the Hoffman House in New York City. Edward Murphy Jr. was chairman. The incumbent judge Robert Earl was re-nominated unanimously.

The Socialist Labor state convention met on September 25 at Clarendon House in New York City. Francis Gerau was nominated for the Court of Appeals.

== Result ==
The jointly nominated incumbent Robert Earl was re-elected.

68 Democrats and 60 Republicans were elected for the session of 1891 to the New York State Assembly. The New York State Senate consisted of 19 Republicans and 13 Democrats.

1890 state election result
Office	Democratic ticket		Republican ticket	Prohibition ticket		Socialist Labor ticket	
Judge of the Court of Appeals	Robert Earl	927,243	Robert Earl	Silas W. Mason	33,621	Francis Gerau	13,704

== See also ==
- New York state elections

== Sources ==
- Result in New York City: THE VOTE IN THE COUNTY in NYT on November 21, 1890
- Result in Kings County: BETTER LATE THAN NEVER in NYT on December 3, 1890
- Result: The Tribune Almanac 1891
