= Beatty v. Guggenheim Exploration Co. =

- Court: New York Court of Appeals
- Full case name: Alfred C. Beatty v Guggenheim Exploration Company et al
- Decided: 28 January 1919

Court membership
- Chief judge: Hiscock Ch J
- Associate judges: Chase J, Collin J and Crane J concurred. Cuddeback J and Hogan J dissented, favouring a new trial.

Case opinions
- Majority: Hiscock, joined by Chase, Collin, Crane
- Dissent: Cuddeback, joined by Hogan

Beatty v. Guggenheim Exploration Co. 225 N.Y. 380 (1919) is a New York state law case, concerning the test for the imposition of a constructive trust. It is best known for a quote from the leading opinion by Justice Cardozo.

The constructive trust is the formula through which the conscience of equity finds expression. When property has been acquired in such circumstances that the holder of the legal title may not in good conscience retain the beneficial interest, equity converts him into a trustee.

== Judgment ==
Cardozo J gave the following judgment.

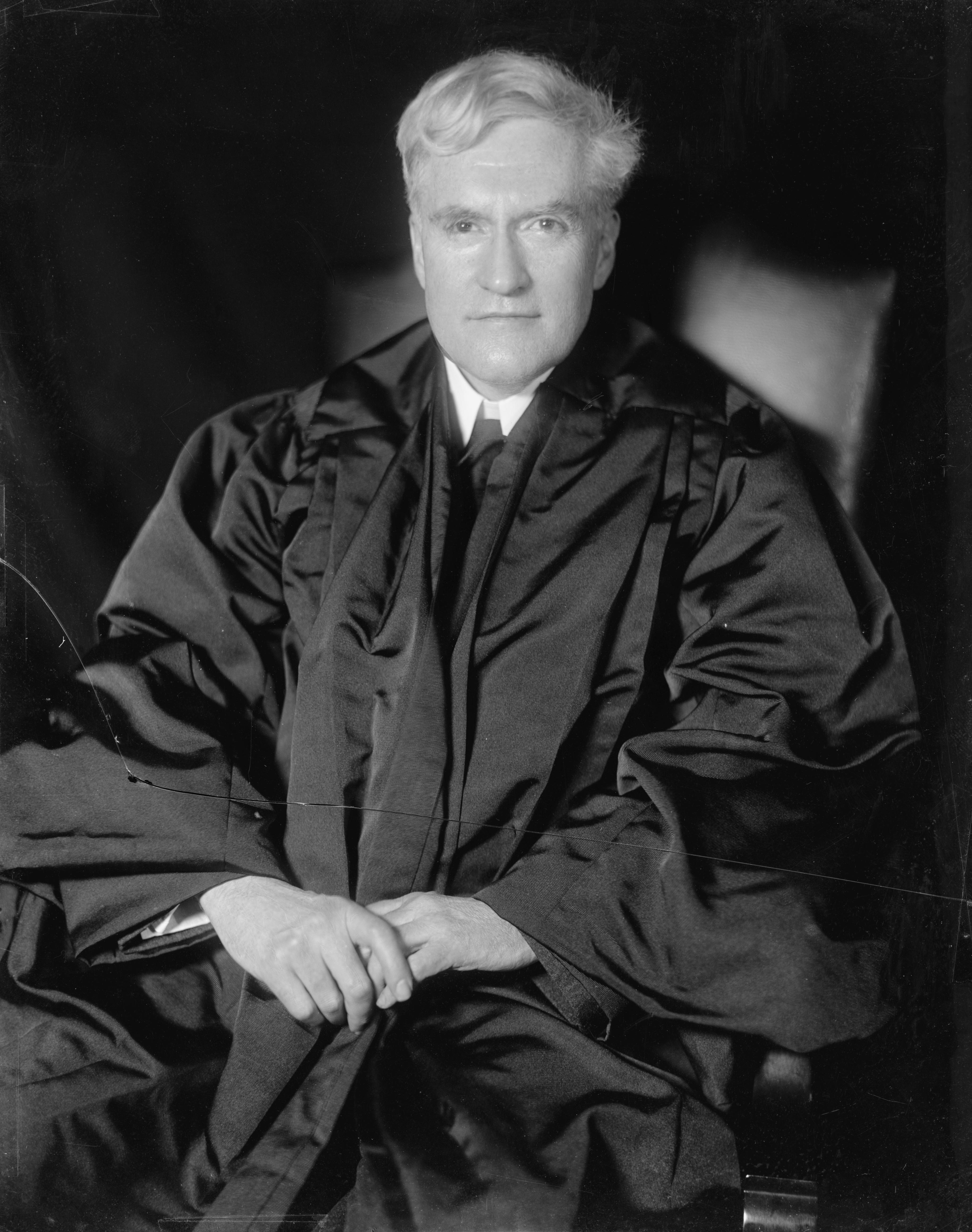
Justice Cardozo.

This case is here upon re-argument. We need not rehearse the facts. They are concisely stated in Judge Cuddeback's opinion (223 N. Y. 294). We held then that there could be no recovery by the plaintiff of compensation paid to Perry under the Perry-Guggenheim contract. That question is no longer open. We did not pass upon the Perry-Treadgold contract, but left the plaintiff's rights under that contract for adjudication on a second trial. The re-argument thereafter ordered was restricted to a single question. The question is whether plaintiff's rights under the Perry-Treadgold contract may be finally determined now.

The defendants argue that the two contracts are inseparably united in scheme and execution. They say, therefore, that misconduct in respect of one defeats recovery under the other. But we think there is no such union as the argument assumes. The two transactions are clearly severable. The plaintiff had an interest with Perry in claims "89 to 104 below discovery at Bonanza Creek." Those claims were the subject of the Perry-Treadgold contract. The plaintiff had another interest in compensation paid to Perry for services in the Yukon district. That compensation was the subject of the Perry-Guggenheim contract. Perry had done work, and was entitled to pay. The plaintiff persuaded him to ask for more pay than would otherwise have satisfied him, in order that plaintiff might get a share of it. We held that this was a breach of the plaintiff's duty to his employer. The payment, thus unlawfully swollen, was subject to a constructive trust. Our decision went no farther. But the payment for Perry's services is quite distinct from the payment of Perry's profits in the sale of Treadgold's claims. The amount due under each head is stated in the findings. Increase of the one had no tendency to swell the measure of the other. Subsequent misconduct in another and distinct transaction does not work a forfeiture of rights already lawfully accrued.

There remains, however, a question at once more important and more difficult. It is whether the plaintiff ever lawfully acquired a share in the profits of the Perry-Treadgold contract, considered by itself. He had agreed with his employer that he would not become directly or indirectly interested in, or connected with, any person, partnership or corporation engaged in any similar business. He had also agreed that none of the covenants or conditions of the contract should be "waived, modified, altered, or annulled" except by writing subscribed by the parties, who further covenanted that they would not "urge or claim any such waiver, alteration, modification or amendment unless the same be evidenced by such writing." The finding is that the president and the general manager of the employer knew that plaintiff was interested in the Perry- Treadgold contract and consented thereto, but no written consent was found or proved. The question, therefore, subdivides itself into two branches. One is whether the plaintiff, if he had purchased an interest in the claims without the consent of his employer, would be chargeable as a trustee. The other is whether consent not evidenced by a writing has varied the employer's rights.

We think the situation is one where an employer, not consenting to the investment, would have the right, if he so elected, to hold the plaintiff as trustee.

The plaintiff was sent to the Yukon to investigate mining claims which were the subject of an option. He found certain other claims which were not included in the option, but which he believed to be essential to the successful operation of those that were included. In conjunction with Perry, he purchased rights in the new claims. The two were partners in the venture. Later his employer, appreciating the importance of the claims, determined to buy them for itself. We think it had the right to say to the agent that he must renounce the profits of the transaction and transfer the claims at cost. A different situation would be presented if the claims had no relation to those which the plaintiff was under a duty to investigate. But they had an intimate relation. One could not profitably be operated without the other. Let us suppose that the plaintiff, instead of buying the claims as a partner with Perry, had bought them alone. No one, we think, would say that he could have retained them against his employer, and held out for an extravagant price, as, of course, he could have done if the purchase was not affected by a trust. It is not an answer to say that he was not bound to risk his money as he did, or to go into the enterprise at all (Rose v. Hayden, 35 Kan. 106, 118). He might have kept out of it altogether, but if he went in, he could not withhold from his employer the benefit of the bargain (Trice v. Comstock, 121 Fed. Rep. 620; Felix v. Patrick, 145 U. S. 317, 327; Massie v. Watts, 6 Cranch, 148; Ringo v. Binns, 10 Pet. 269; Gardner v. Ogden, 22 N. Y. 327; Sea Coast R. R. Co. v. Wood, 65 N. J. Eq. 530; Fox [*386] v. Mackreth, 1 Wh. & T. Lead. Cases in Eq. 141; Perry on Trusts [6th ed.], sec. 206).

We think, therefore, that aside from the special provisions of this contract, the agent became a trustee at the election of the principal. But the contract reinforces that conclusion. It is true that an agent or a partner who breaks a covenant not to engage in some other business does not, as a matter of course, become chargeable as a trustee for the profits of the forbidden venture (Dean v. MacDowell, L. R. 8 Ch. Div. 345; Trimble v. Goldberg, 1906, A. C. 494, 500; Aas v. Benham, 1891, 2 Ch. Div. 244; Latta v. Kilbourn, 150 U. S. 524, 547, 548). The agent may be discharged; the partnership may be dissolved; there may be an action for damages. But to raise a trust there must be more. It is sometimes said that the profits of the forbidden venture must have been diverted from the business of the principal or the partnership (See cases, supra). We think it may fairly be found that there was a diversion of profits here. But the test of diversion is not exhaustive. For most cases it may supply a working rule, but the rule is a phase or illustration of a principle still larger. A constructive trust is the formula through which the conscience of equity finds expression. When property has been acquired in such circumstances that the holder of the legal title may not in good conscience retain the beneficial interest, equity converts him into a trustee (Moore v. Crawford, 130 U. S. 122, 128; Pomeroy Eq. Jur. sec. 1053). We think it would be against good conscience for the plaintiff to retain these profits unless his employer has consented. The tie was close between the employer's business and the forbidden venture. The profits which the agent claims have come from the employer's coffers. If the agent must account as a trustee, the price which the employer pays is to that extent diminished. If the agent retains the profit, the price is to that extent increased. Of course it is true that if Perry had made the purchase alone, without the aid of plaintiff, the employer might be no better off. That is true whenever an agent goes into some competing venture. His associates might have succeeded in diverting equal profits without him. The disability is personal to him. Others may divert profits from the business of the principal. He may not. If he does, he must account for them.

We conclude, therefore, that the plaintiff was chargeable as a trustee if the employer so elected. But the Appellate Division has found upon sufficient evidence that the employer consented to the investment. The plaintiff, when he associated himself with Perry, reserved the privilege of withdrawal. The contract was that if the president or the general manager disapproved of his investment, then the payment which he had made, instead of being a purchase of a share in a joint enterprise, should be a loan to Perry personally. This is found by the trial judge as well as by the Appellate Division. The testimony is that, in that event, the loan was to be repaid in a reasonable time. The president and the general manager, with knowledge that the plaintiff had reserved this privilege of withdrawal, consented that the investment be retained. The question is whether the employer may now have the aid of a court of equity to impress upon the investment the quality of a constructive trust.

The question would answer itself if it were not for the covenant that there shall be no waiver or amendment not evidenced by a writing. The employer sets up this covenant to nullify its oral consent. The employee asserts that the covenant is nugatory. Those who make a contract, may unmake it. The clause which forbids a change, may be changed like any other. The prohibition of oral waiver, may itself be waived. "Every such agreement is ended by the new one which contradicts it" (Westchester F. Ins. Co. v. Earle, 33 Mich. 143, 153). What is excluded by one act, is restored by another. You may put it out by the door; it is back through the window. Whenever two men contract, no limitation self-imposed can destroy their power to contract again (Pechner v. Phoenix Ins. Co., 65 N. Y. 195, 204, 205; Solomon v. Vallette, 152 N. Y. 147, 151; F. F. Ins. Co. v. Norwood, 69 Fed. Rep. 71; McElroy v. B. A. Assur. Co., 94 Fed. Rep. 990; Westchester F. Ins. Co. v. Earle, supra; Ewart on the Law of Waiver, p. 286). The defendant argues that there was a locus pænitentiæ. The plaintiff, we are told, did nothing on the faith of the consent, and hence the defendant should be permitted to recall it. There may be other answers to that argument, but it is a sufficient one, we think, that at the time of the consent the transaction was still executory. The plaintiff had reserved the right to withdraw from the joint enterprise if his employer disapproved of it, and in that event to treat his advances as a loan. On the faith of the consent, he turned a loan into a purchase. It is too late, years afterwards, for the employer to cancel the consent, and insist that the purchase be turned back into a loan.

We hold, therefore, that the consent, though oral, gives protection to the agent, and acquits him of a breach of contract. But if this were doubtful, another path would bring us to the same result. The question here is not whether a contract has been broken. There has been no attempt to discharge the agent, to terminate his contract, or to hold him liable for damages. The question is whether the breach, if it be assumed, demands the implication of a trust. The oral consent is at least sufficient to preclude that implication. It is at least equivalent to an election that the agent, however delinquent, shall not be charged as a trustee. To use it for that purpose is not to waive or change a provision of the contract, and so the covenant does not apply, even if it could ever be effective. Much of the trouble comes from the use of the misleading word "waiver" (Ewart Law of Waiver, p. 3). It is made to stand for many things—sometimes for estoppel, sometimes for contract, sometimes for election (Ewart, supra). The oral consent may not have created an estoppel, nor modified a contract, and yet it may have established an election. Admit for the purpose of the argument that the plaintiff broke his contract when he took an interest in a mine. Even then, the employer was not bound to charge him as a trustee. At the utmost, it had a right of election (Hammond v. Hopkins, 143 U. S. 224; Kahn v. Chapin, 152 N. Y. 305, 309). It might adopt or reject the purchase. Neither adoption nor rejection would be a change of the contract. It would be an election between remedies. But plainly such an election could be made without a writing. It is one thing to hold that a writing is necessary to obliterate the wrong. It is another thing to exact a writing where there has been nothing but a choice among the remedies that are available for the redress of wrong. The plaintiff said to his employer: "I can treat this transaction either as a loan or as a joint venture. Which shall I do?" The employer answered: "You may treat it as the latter." After an election so decisive, announced while there was still an opportunity to withdraw, good conscience no longer demands that the agent be charged as a trustee. A court of equity in decreeing a constructive trust is bound by no unyielding formula. The equity of the transaction must shape the measure of relief.

Our conclusion, therefore, is that the judgment of the Appellate Division should be modified so that the award made to the plaintiff shall be limited to his share of the profits under the so-called Perry-Treadgold contract, to wit: $27,300 in cash with interest from April 1, 1908, and 5,460 shares of the capital stock of the Yukon Gold Company of the par value of $27,300 with any dividends declared thereon since April 1, 1908; that in the event of any dispute between the parties as to the correctness of the aforesaid computation of profits either party shall be at liberty to apply to the Special Term of the Supreme Court at the foot of the judgment herein for further directions with reference thereto; that they may also make like application for further directions in respect of the enforcement of the judgment if such directions become necessary; and that as so modified, the judgment of the Appellate Division be affirmed, without costs to either party in any court.

Hiscock Ch J, Chase J, Collin J and Crane J concurred.

Cuddeback J and Hogan J dissented, favouring a new trial.

== See also ==
- US trusts law
- English trusts law
- Meinhard v. Salmon, 164 N.E. 545 (N.Y. 1928)
