= Mary Raymond Andrews =

American writer (1860–1936)

Mary Raymond Andrews (née Shipman; April 2, 1860 – August 2, 1936) was an American writer. She is best known for a widely read short story about US President Abraham Lincoln, "The Perfect Tribute", which was adapted for film twice and sold 600,000 copies when published as a standalone volume.

== Biography ==
Mary Raymond Shipman was born in Mobile, Alabama, the oldest child of the Reverend Jacob Shipman, rector of Christ Episcopal Church. She grew up in Lexington, Kentucky, where her father was rector of another Christ Church. Her younger brother, Herbert Shipman, later became suffragan bishop of New York.

In 1884, she married William Shankland Andrews, a young lawyer who would become judge of the New York Court of Appeals and spent most of the rest of her life in Syracuse, New York. They lived on an estate named Wolf Hollow in nearby Taunton, New York. They had one child, Paul Shipman Andrews, who became dean of the Syracuse University College of Law.

For thirty years, the Andrewses spent summers at a wilderness camp about a hundred miles outside Quebec. In 1926, Andrews qualified as big game hunter. Her experiences with outdoor activities informed her work, and she became known for her stories depicting the outdoor adventures of boys engaging in hunting, camping, and fishing. Many of these stories were published in her collections Bob and the Guides and The Eternal Masculine.

Aside from her boys' stories, Andrews primarily was known for sentimental and melodramatic magazine fiction. Many of her works were published in Scribner's Magazine, including her first published story, "Crowned with Glory and Honor", in 1902. She also wrote The Marshal, a Napoleonic historical novel, Crosses of War, a collection of World War I poetry, A Lost Commander, a biography of Florence Nightingale, and The Eternal Feminine, a collection of stories about women.

Andrews also wrote the chapter "The School Boy" in The Whole Family, a collaborative novel featuring chapters written by different authors, including Henry James and William Dean Howells. Andrews was asked to contribute the chapter about the boy Billy Talbert after Mark Twain declined. The connections between Andrews' contribution to The Whole Family and her other work, and the cultural significance of her representations of sentimental masculinity, are analyzed in June Howard's Publishing the Family.

Andrews' best remembered work, "The Perfect Tribute", appeared in Scribner's in July 1906. It depicts Lincoln writing and delivering the Gettysburg Address, then concluding his speech was an utter failure. Later, he comforts a Confederate Captain as he dies in a prison hospital, and the Captain, who does not recognize him, praises the Address as "one of the great speeches in history".

The widely read story was assigned reading for multiple generations of school children in the United States and may be the most popular book ever published about Lincoln, though historians take issue with Andrews' work. The story was largely responsible for the persistent myth that Lincoln hurriedly wrote the Address on the train on the way to Gettysburg.

That story reached Andrews through her son Paul, whose history teacher, Walter Burlingame, overheard his father, diplomat Anson Burlingame, hear it from Senator Edward Everett, the featured speaker at Gettysburg. Burlingame's other son, Edward L. Burlingame, was the founding editor of Scribner's.

"The Perfect Tribute" was adapted into a 1935 MGM short film starring Chic Sale as Lincoln and a 1991 television movie starring Jason Robards as the President. Two of Andrews' other works were adapted for film: The Courage of the Common Place in 1917 and Three Things, as The Unbeliever in 1918.

== Bibliography ==
- Vive L'Empereur (1902)
- A Kidnapped Colony (1903)
- Bob and the Guides (1906)
- A Good Samaritan (1906)
- The Perfect Tribute (1906)
- The Militants (1907)
- The Enchanted Forest (1909)
- The Courage of the Common Place (1911)
- Counsel Assigned (1912)
- The Marshal (1912)
- The Eternal Masculine (1913)
- August First with R.I. Murray (1915)
- Three Things (1915)
- The Eternal Feminine (1916)
- Old Glory (1916), a collection of 3 stories: The Colors, The Stranger Within the Gates, and The Star-Spangled Banner
- Crosses of War (1918)
- Her Country (1918)
- Joy in the Morning (1919)
- His Soul Goes Marching On (1922)
- Yellow Butterflies (1922)
- Pontifex Maximus (1925)
- A Lost Commander: Florence Nightingale (1929)
- White Satin Dress (1930)
