= Epenetus Howe =

American politician

Member of the New York State Assembly from the Tioga County district
- In office 1894–1895
- Preceded by: Edward G. Tracy
- Succeeded by: Daniel P. Witter

Personal details
- Born: December 6, 1836 Auburn, New York, U.S.
- Died: September 20, 1909 (aged 72) Candor, New York, U.S.
- Spouse: Sarah Amanda Legg

Epenetus Howe (December 6, 1836 – September 20, 1909) was an American farmer and politician from New York.

== Early life ==
Howe was born on December 6, 1836, in Auburn, New York, the son of Epenetus Howe and Emeline Cooper.

When he was six months old, Howe and his family moved to New York City. He was educated in Elizabeth, New Jersey.

== Career ==
He then moved to Caroline, New York, where he worked on a farm. He bought a farm of his own in 1858.

Howe was elected town supervisor of Caroline in 1876 and 1877, both times as an independent. In the 1878 United States House of Representatives elections, he ran as a Greenbacker for New York's 28th congressional district. He was the Greenback candidate in the 1881 New York state election for Secretary of State of New York and the 1882 New York state election for Governor of New York. In 1885, he moved to Candor. In Candor, he was elected to two terms as town supervisor. He was a master of the local Grange in both Speedville and Candor.

In 1893, Howe was elected to the New York State Assembly as a Republican, representing Tioga County. He served in the Assembly in 1894 and 1895.

== Personal life ==
In 1859, Howe married Sarah Amanda Legg. He was a member of the Congregational church. He was a member of the Freemasons and the Improved Order of Red Men. He was a prominent lecturer for the temperance movement.

Howe died on September 20, 1909, in Candor, New York, after a long illness. He was buried in Maple Grove Cemetery.

New York State Assembly
| Preceded by Edward G. Tracy | New York State Assembly; Tioga County; 1894-1895 | Succeeded by Daniel P. Witter |
