= Edward G. Tracy =

American pharmacist and politician from New York (1841–1898)

Edward Griffin Tracy (1841 – May 11, 1898) was an American pharmacist and politician from New York.

== Life ==
Tracy was born in 1841 in Smithfield, Pennsylvania.

Tracy lived on the family farm until he was 20, at which point he worked at a store in Lock Haven. He was forced to leave for health reasons and came under the care of his older brother, a physician. He then decided to become a pharmacist, and in 1867 moved to Waverly, New York and joined a partnership with G. F. Waterloo. In 1882, he bought his partner's interest and worked as a pharmacist on his own.

Tracy served on the Waverly board of education for 10 years, serving as secretary for five years and president for four. He served as town supervisor for Barton from 1889 to 1891. In 1891, he was elected to the New York State Assembly as a Republican, representing Tioga County. He served in the Assembly in 1892 and 1893. In 1896, he was elected village president.

Tracy was a trustee of the local Presbyterian church. He was married, and had a son named Edwin.

Tracy died at home from typhoid fever on May 11, 1898. He was buried in Glenwood Cemetery.

New York State Assembly
Preceded by Royal W. Clinton	New York State Assembly; Tioga County; 1892-1893	Succeeded by Epenetus Howe
