= Robert Earl (judge) =

American judge (1824–1902)

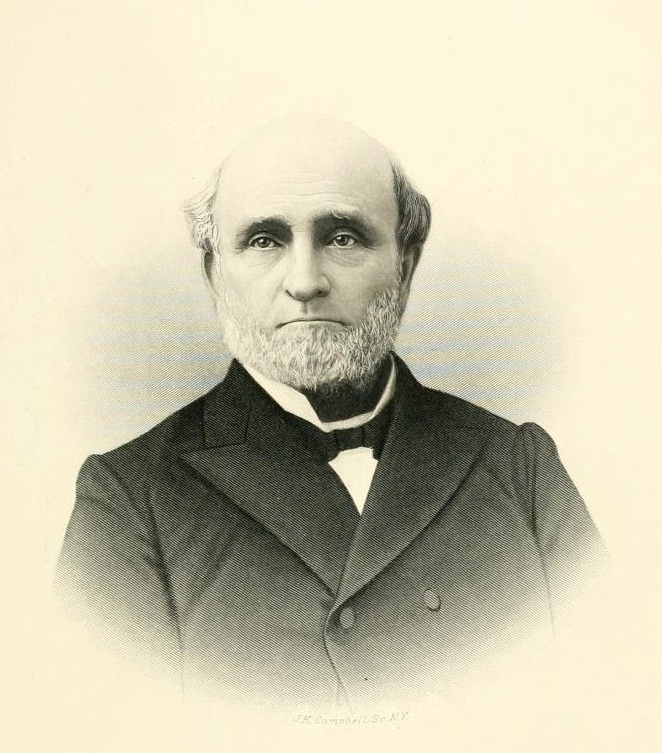
- Robert Earl (1893)

Chief Judge of the New York Court of Appeals
- In office 1869 - 1870, 1875 – 1894
- Appointed by: Governor Samuel J. Tilden

Commissioner of Appeals
- In office 1870–1872

First Judge and Surrogate, Herkimer County Court
- In office 1856–1859

Personal details
- Born: September 20, 1824 Herkimer, New York
- Died: December 2, 1902 (aged 78) Herkimer, New York
- Resting place: Oak Hill Cemetery, Herkimer, New York
- Spouse: Juliette L. Wilkerson

Robert Earl (September 20, 1824 – December 2, 1902 Herkimer) was an American lawyer and politician from New York. He was Chief Judge of the New York Court of Appeals in 1870 and 1892.

== Early life ==
He was born on September 20, 1824, in the Town of Herkimer, in Herkimer County, New York. He was educated at the Herkimer Academy, and graduated from Union College in Schenectady in 1845. After graduation, he became Principal of Herkimer Academy, and at the same time studied law with Charles Gray in Herkimer. He was admitted to the bar in 1848, and practiced in partnership with his brother Samuel in their law firm in the Village of Herkimer, S. & R. Earl.

As a young lawyer, Earl was active in local politics and civic affairs. In 1849, he acquired a weekly newspaper, the "Herkimer Democrat", and served as its editor and publisher. In the same year, he was elected a supervisor of Herkimer, then trustee of the village, and again supervisor in 1860. He was also elected First Judge and Surrogate of the Herkimer County Court in 1855, and served from 1856 to 1859. In 1868, he served as President of the New York Democratic State Convention.

== New York Court of Appeals ==
In 1869, he was elected on the Democratic ticket to the seat on the New York Court of Appeals to which Henry R. Selden had been elected in 1863. After Selden's resignation in January 1865, the seat had been occupied by John K. Porter (appointed 1865, elected for the remainder of the term in Nov. 1865, resigned Dec. 1867) and Lewis B. Woodruff (appointed 1868). Earl would have served for the remaining two years of the term, but was legislated out of office on July 4, 1870, when the Court of Appeals was completely re-organized. As the elected judge with the shortest remaining term, as was the rule established by the New York State Constitution of 1846, he was Chief Judge during his half year in office in 1870.

From 1870 to 1875, he was one of the Commissioners of Appeals.

On November 5, 1875, he was appointed by Governor Samuel J. Tilden to the Court of Appeals to fill the vacancy caused by the death of Martin Grover. At the New York state election, 1876, he was re-elected on the Democratic ticket for a full fourteen-year term, and was re-elected with Republican endorsement at the New York state election, 1890. On January 19, 1892, he was appointed Chief Judge again, to fill the vacancy caused by the death of William C. Ruger, and remained on the post until the end of the year. He left the bench at the end of 1894 when he reached the constitutional age limit of 70 years.

While serving on the Court of Appeals, Earl received honorary LL.D. degrees from Union College in 1874, and from Columbia College in 1887.

== Life after retirement from bench ==
After retiring from the bench in 1894, Judge Earl returned to his home community of Herkimer, where he joined with several others to form the Herkimer Bank, which became the Herkimer National Bank in 1898. In 1896, Earl founded the Herkimer Historical Society, and as the Society's president contributed numerous research papers and historical essays. He encouraged the youth of Herkimer County by offering prizes for the best essays submitted to the Historical Society. And, 1896 he donated his residence and grounds for the establishment of the Herkimer Free Public Library. While Earl's residence and grounds still existed in 2014, the library was moved in the 1970s to another location in the Village of Herkimer, and renamed the "Frank J. Basloe Library".

He suffered a stroke on November 22, 1902, and died ten days later at his home in the Village of Herkimer. He was buried at the Oak Hill Cemetery there.

== See also ==
- Riggs v. Palmer, 1889, one of his opinions

Legal offices
Preceded by Ward Hunt	Chief Judge of the New York Court of Appeals; 1870	Succeeded by Sanford E. Church
Preceded by William C. Ruger	Chief Judge of the New York Court of Appeals; 1892	Succeeded by Charles Andrews
