= Charles J. Folger =

American lawyer and politician

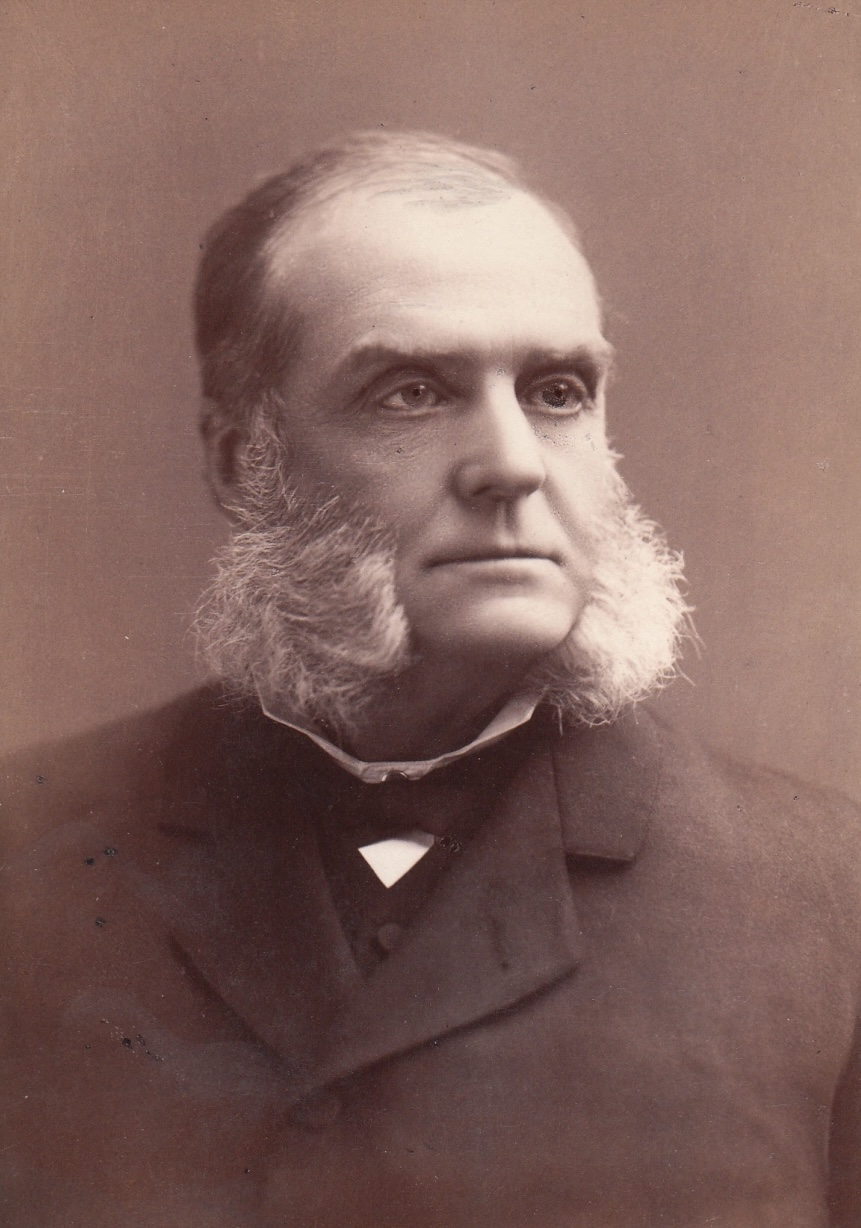
- Folger c. 1881–1884

34th United States Secretary of the Treasury
- In office November 14, 1881 – September 4, 1884
- President: Chester A. Arthur
- Preceded by: William Windom
- Succeeded by: Walter Q. Gresham

Chief Judge of the New York Court of Appeals
- In office May 20, 1880 – November 14, 1881
- Preceded by: Sanford E. Church
- Succeeded by: Charles Andrews

Judge of the New York Court of Appeals
- In office 1870 – November 14, 1881

Member of the New York Senate from the 26th district
- In office January 1, 1862 – December 31, 1869
- Preceded by: Thomas Hillhouse
- Succeeded by: Abraham V. Harpending

Personal details
- Born: April 16, 1818 Nantucket, Massachusetts, U.S.
- Died: September 4, 1884 (aged 66) Geneva, New York, U.S.
- Party: Republican
- Spouse: Susan Worth
- Education: Hobart College (BA)

Charles James Folger (April 16, 1818 – September 4, 1884) was an American lawyer and politician. A member of the Republican Party, he was a State Senator in New York from 1862 to 1869 and served as the 34th U.S. Secretary of the Treasury from November 14, 1881 until his death in 1884. Folger was the Republican nominee for Governor of New York in 1882, but was defeated by the Democratic Party's nominee, future President Grover Cleveland.

== Early life ==
He was born in 1818 on the island of Nantucket, Massachusetts. When Folger was 12 years old his family moved to Geneva, New York. He later attended Geneva College (now called Hobart and William Smith Colleges), where in 1836 he graduated with honors. After his graduation, he read law with Mark H. Sibley and Alvah Worden in Canandaigua, New York and was admitted to the bar of New York state three years later in 1839. He began his practice in Lyons, New York, but returned to Geneva in 1840, where he remained for the rest of his life. On June 18, 1844, he married Susan Rebecca Worth.

== Public life ==
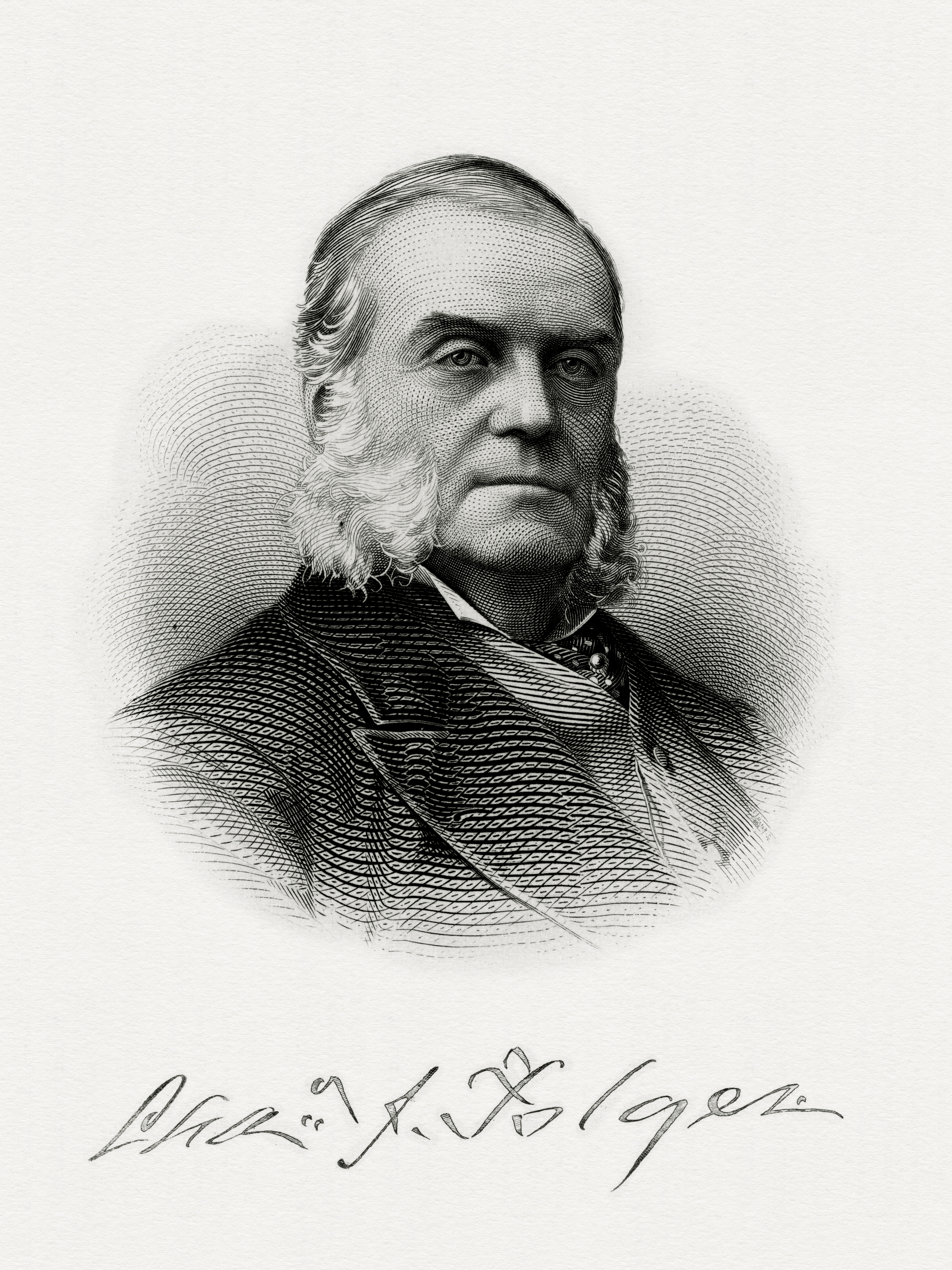
Bureau of Engraving and Printing portrait of Folger as Secretary of the Treasury.

In 1844, Folger was appointed to the bench of the Ontario County Court of Common Pleas, serving for about a year.

He was a Republican member of the New York State Senate (26th D.) from 1862 to 1869, sitting in the 85th, 86th, 87th, 88th, 89th, 90th, 91st and 92nd New York State Legislatures. During his term he served as President pro tempore for four years and as Chairman of the Judiciary Committee. Folger served as a delegate to the New York State Constitutional Convention of 1867–68 and to the 1868 Republican National Convention.

Folger resigned from the State Senate in 1869, having been appointed by President Ulysses S. Grant to Assistant United States Treasurer in New York City. The following year, Folger was elected one of the first judges of the re-organized New York Court of Appeals. After the death of Sanford E. Church, Folger was appointed Chief Judge by Governor Alonzo B. Cornell on May 20, 1880, to fill the vacancy temporarily. In November he was elected to a full 14-year term as Chief Judge.

He was a member of the "Stalwart" faction of the Republican Party, led by New York senator Roscoe Conkling, which was known during the early Gilded Age for its advocacy of civil rights and opposition towards civil service reform.

In 1881, President James Garfield offered Folger the position of United States Attorney General, which he declined. Later that year, he resigned from the bench to accept an appointment by President Chester Arthur to serve as Secretary of the Treasury. In 1883 he appointed Mifflin E. Bell to the Office of the Supervising Architect for the U.S. Treasury, an agency that designed federal government buildings from 1852 to 1939.

== Gubernatorial race ==
While serving as U.S. Secretary of the Treasury, Folger ran in 1882 for Governor of New York, but was defeated by Democrat Grover Cleveland.

== Death ==
Folger died on September 4, 1884, at his home on Main Street in Geneva, NY. He was buried at Glenwood Cemetery, Geneva, at the side of his wife who had died seven years earlier.

The Geneva Fire Department's C.J. Folger Hook & Ladder Co. #1 is named in his honor, as is Folger Park in Washington, D.C. In 1879 and 1880, a company of the New York Army National Guard was organized in Geneva and named the Folger Independent Corps in honor of Folger. The unit became the 34th Independent Company and served during the Spanish–American War as Company B, 3rd New York Infantry Regiment. The unit currently exists as Co. D, 2nd Battalion, 108th Infantry Regiment, based in Ithaca, New York.

New York State Senate
Preceded by Thomas Hillhouse	Member of the New York Senate from the 26th district 1862–1869	Succeeded by Abraham V. Harpending
Legal offices
Preceded by Sanford E. Church	Chief Judge of the New York Court of Appeals; 1880–1881	Succeeded by Charles Andrews
Political offices
Preceded by William Windom	United States Secretary of the Treasury; 1881–1884	Succeeded by Walter Q. Gresham
Party political offices
Preceded by Alonzo B. Cornell	Republican nominee for Governor of New York; 1882	Succeeded by Ira Davenport
