= Charles Andrews (New York judge) =

American judge and politician (1827–1918)

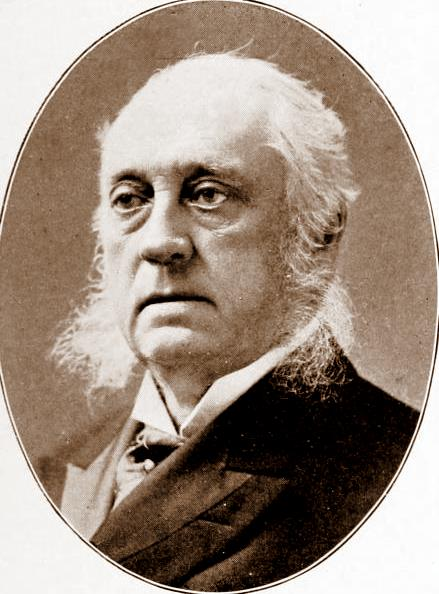

Chief Judge of the New York Court of Appeals
- In office 1892-1897
- In office 1881–1882
- Preceded by: Charles J. Folger
- Succeeded by: William C. Ruger

Associate Judge of the New York Court of Appeals
- In office 1884–1892
- In office 1870–1881

13th & 17th Mayor of Syracuse
- In office 1868–1870
- In office 1861–1862

Onondaga County District Attorney
- In office 1854–1856

Personal details
- Born: May 27, 1827 New York Mills, New York
- Died: October 22, 1918 (aged 91) Syracuse, New York
- Party: Republican
- Spouse: Marcia A. Shankland (m. 1855)
- Children: William Shankland Andrews

Charles Andrews (May 27, 1827 – October 22, 1918) was an American lawyer and politician. He was Chief Judge of the New York Court of Appeals from 1881 to 1882 and from 1892 to 1897.

== Life ==
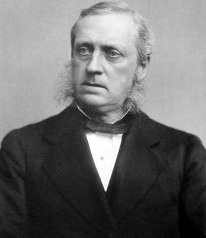
Photograph of Charles Andrews

Charles was the son of George and Polly Andrews. He was educated at Cazenovia Seminary and then studied law in Syracuse, New York. He was admitted to the bar in 1849. On May 17, 1855, he married Marcia A. Shankland (1832–1921), and had a son: William Shankland Andrews.

Charles Andrews was District Attorney of Onondaga County from 1854 to 1856. He was Mayor of Syracuse, New York from 1861 to 1862, and 1868. He was a delegate to the New York State Constitutional Convention of 1867, and to the 1868 Republican National Convention.

In May 1870, he was elected one of the first judges of the re-organized New York Court of Appeals. He was appointed Chief Judge by Governor Alonzo B. Cornell after the resignation of Charles J. Folger in 1881, and remained on the post until the end of 1882. At the State election in November 1882, Andrews ran to succeed himself for a full 14-year term as Chief Judge but was defeated by Democrat William C. Ruger. Andrews resumed his post as an associate judge and was re-elected unopposed to another 14-year term in November 1884. In November 1892, he was elected unopposed Chief Judge. He retired at the end of 1897 when he reached the constitutional age limit of 70 years, after 27 and a half years on the Court of Appeals bench, the longest tenure ever.

== Death ==
He died on October 22, 1918 in Syracuse, New York and was buried at Oakwood Cemetery.

Legal offices
Preceded by Charles J. Folger	Chief Judge of the New York Court of Appeals; 1881–1882	Succeeded by William C. Ruger
Preceded by Robert Earl	Chief Judge of the New York Court of Appeals; 1892–1897	Succeeded by Alton B. Parker
