= William C. Ruger =

American judge from New York (1824-1892)

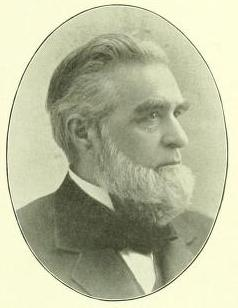
- William C. Ruger

Chief Judge of the New York Court of Appeals
- In office 1883–1892
- Preceded by: Charles Andrews
- Succeeded by: Robert Earl

Personal details
- Born: January 30, 1824 Bridgewater
- Died: January 14, 1892 (aged 67) Syracuse, New York
- Spouse: Harriet Prosser

William Crawford Ruger (January 30, 1824 – January 14, 1892) was an American lawyer and politician from New York. He was Chief Judge of the New York Court of Appeals from 1883 until his death.

== Life ==
He was the son of Sophia (Brown) Ruger and John Ruger (d. 1855), an attorney who practiced at Bridgewater, but moved to Syracuse, N.Y., in 1847. William C. Ruger was educated at Bridgewater Academy, then studied law with his father, was admitted to the bar in 1845, and commenced practice in Bridgewater.

In 1853, he moved to Syracuse, N.Y., and formed a partnership with his father. On May 2, 1860, he married Harriet Prosser (1836–1909), a daughter of State Senator Erastus S. Prosser, and their son was Crawford Prosser Ruger (1862–1907).

William C. Ruger was a delegate to the 1872 Democratic National Convention. In November 1882, he was elected on the Democratic ticket Chief Judge of the Court of Appeals, and died in office in 1892. He was buried at Oakwood Cemetery (Syracuse, New York).

State Senator William Ruger (d. 1843) was his uncle.

== Sources ==
- Political Graveyard
- Listing of Court of Appeals judges, with portrait
- Obit in NYT on January 15, 1892

Legal offices
Preceded by Charles Andrews	Chief Judge of the New York Court of Appeals; 1883–1892	Succeeded by Robert Earl
