= John Van Voorhis (judge) =

American judge (1897–1983)

John H. Van Voorhis (June 14, 1897 – November 25, 1983) was an American lawyer and politician.

== Life ==
Van Voorhis was born on June 14, 1897, in Irondequoit, Monroe County, New York, the son of Eugene Van Voorhis (c.1864–1943) and Allis (Sherman) Van Voorhis. He graduated A.B. from Yale College in 1919. On June 2, 1928, he married Linda Gale Lyon (ca. 1902-1989), and they had three children. He was a member and warden of All Saints Episcopal Church in Irondequoit.

== Career ==
Van Voorhis was admitted to the bar in 1922, and commenced the practice of law in Rochester, New York. He was town attorney of Irondequoit from 1928 to 1933 and again in 1936. That year, he was elected to the New York Supreme Court (7th District), and re-elected in 1950. He sat on the Appellate Division (4th Dept.) from 1947 on. In 1944, he ran on the Republican ticket for the New York Court of Appeals, but was defeated by Democrat Marvin R. Dye.

On April 23, 1953, Van Voorhis was appointed by Governor Thomas E. Dewey to fill the vacancy caused by the appointment of Edmund H. Lewis as Chief Judge of the New York Court of Appeals. In November 1953, Lewis was elected chief judge, and on January 1, 1954, Van Voorhis was re-appointed to the seat. In November 1954, he ran on the Republican and Democratic tickets to succeed himself, and was elected. He retired from the bench at the end of 1967 when he reached the constitutional age limit of 70 years.

Afterwards he resumed the practice of law and taught at New York Law School. He died on November 25, 1983. Congressman John Van Voorhis (1826–1905) was his grandfather.

== See also ==
- John Van Voorhis
- Henry Clay Van Voorhis
- Charles Henry Voorhis

== Sources ==
- The History of the New York Court of Appeals, 1932-2003 by Bernard S. Meyer, Burton C. Agata & Seth H. Agata (page 24)
- Court of Appeals judges
- APPEALS BENCH IS FILLED; Governor Appoints Van Voorhis to State's Highest Court in NYT on April 24, 1953 (subscription required)
- EUGENE VAN VOORHIS His father's obit, in NYT on December 22, 1943 (subscription required)
- Linda L. Van Voorhis, A Poet, Is Dead at 87 His wife's obit, in NYT on August 22, 1987
- MARRIED IN WASHINGTON; Eugene Van Voorhis and Allis Sherman United Yesterday His parents' wedding, in NYT on February 19, 1896
- NY State Courts, Appellate Division First Department Judge Van Voorhis' Biographical Sketch
