= James Alexander Ulio =

United States Army general (1882–1958)

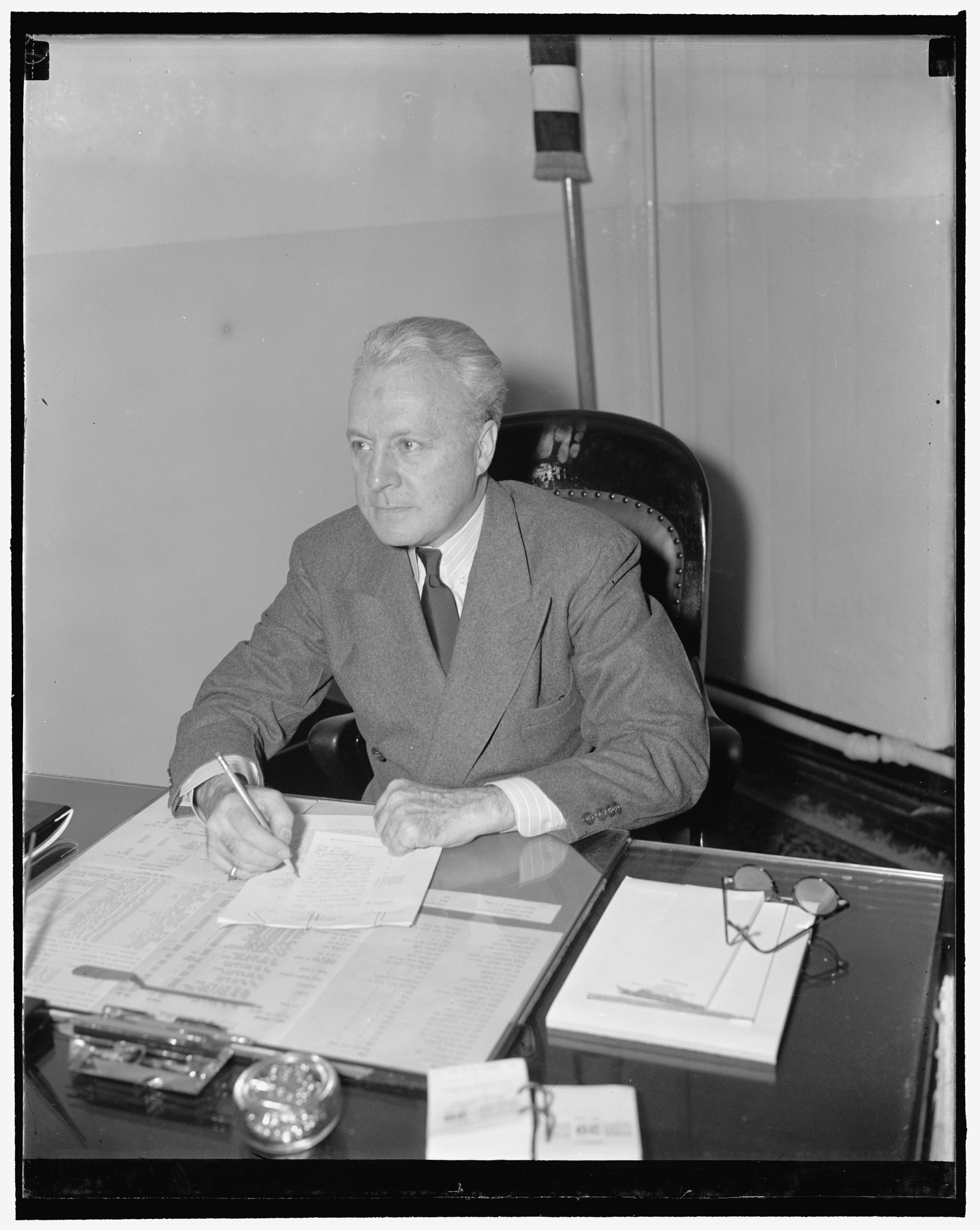
- Ulio in 1940
- Born: 29 June 1882; Walla Walla, Washington, US
- Died: 30 July 1958 (aged 76); Washington, D.C., US
- Burial place: Arlington National Cemetery
- Military career
- Allegiance: United States
- Branch: United States Army
- Service years: 1900–1946
- Rank: Major General
- Service number: O-1984
- Commands: Adjutant General of the U.S. Army
- Conflicts: Philippine–American War; Pancho Villa Expedition; World War I; Battle of Saint-Mihiel; Meuse-Argonne Offensive; Armenian–Azerbaijani War; World War II
- Awards: Distinguished Service Medal (2); Order of the Redeemer (Greece); Order of Prince Danilo I (Montenegro) Order of the White Eagle (Serbia); Order of the Crown of Italy (Italy); Legion of Honor (France); Medal of Solidarity (Panama)

James Alexander Ulio (29 June 1882 – 30 July 1958) was an American military officer who served as Adjutant General in the United States Army from 1942 to 1946. As such, he was responsible for the classification and assignment of soldiers in an Army that would grow to 8.2 million by March 1945.

The son of an Army officer, Ulio was raised on Army posts in the Washington Territory and Montana. He enlisted in the Army in 1900, and rose to be a battalion sergeant major. He was commissioned as a second lieutenant in the infantry in 1904. During World War I he served at El Paso, Texas, during the Pancho Villa Expedition, and on the Western Front, where he was promoted to the temporary rank of lieutenant colonel on the staff of IV Corps. After the Armistice was signed in November 1918, he served with the Army of Occupation in Germany, and in Armenia as chief of staff of the American Relief Administration.

Between the wars Ulio attended the Command and General Staff College and Army War College, and was a junior military aide-de-camp on the staff of the President of the United States, Herbert Hoover, and then on that of his successor, Franklin D. Roosevelt.

On 1 March 1942, Ulio became the Adjutant General with the rank of major general. As Adjutant General, one of his most important roles was notifying families when their loved ones became casualties. Thousands of telegrams went out under his name every day. He also oversaw the Army Postal Service, the National Service Life Insurance scheme, and the military penal system.

== Early life and career ==
James Alexander Ulio was born at Fort Walla Walla in what was then the Washington Territory on 29 June 1882, the son of First Lieutenant James Ulio, an immigrant from Ireland, whose birth name was James Graham, and his wife Caroline née Kohlhauf. He had a sister, Anna. His father had enlisted in the US Army in 1855 and had been commissioned during the American Civil War, in which he had risen to the rank of captain and was breveted as a major. He had briefly left the army after the war but had rejoined as a second lieutenant in 1866. Ulio's middle name was that of his paternal grandfather. He attended Custer County High School in Miles City, Montana, but in those days it went only to year eleven, so he completed high school at Washington School.

Ulio decided to join the Army, so he traveled with his mother to Butte, Montana, to sit the entrance examination. He passed, but only secured an alternative nomination. The nomination went to George V. Strong. Ulio then enlisted in the 10th Infantry Regiment on 1 September 1900. He was appointed a battalion sergeant major at Fort Keogh, Montana, and passed a competitive examination at Fort Leavenworth, Kansas, for a commission. He was commissioned as a second lieutenant in the infantry on 5 October 1904.

For his first posting, Ulio was sent to Fort Brady, Michigan. He was then assigned to the 1st Infantry Regiment and served in the Philippines from 1906 to 1908. When he returned to the United States, he was assigned to the Vancouver Barracks in Washington State. Following his promotion to first lieutenant on 11 March 1911, he served in the Territory of Hawaii at the Schofield Barracks and Fort Shafter from 1912 to 1916. He was promoted to captain on 1 July 1916 and served with the 23rd Infantry Regiment. He served at El Paso, Texas, during the Pancho Villa Expedition.

== World War I ==
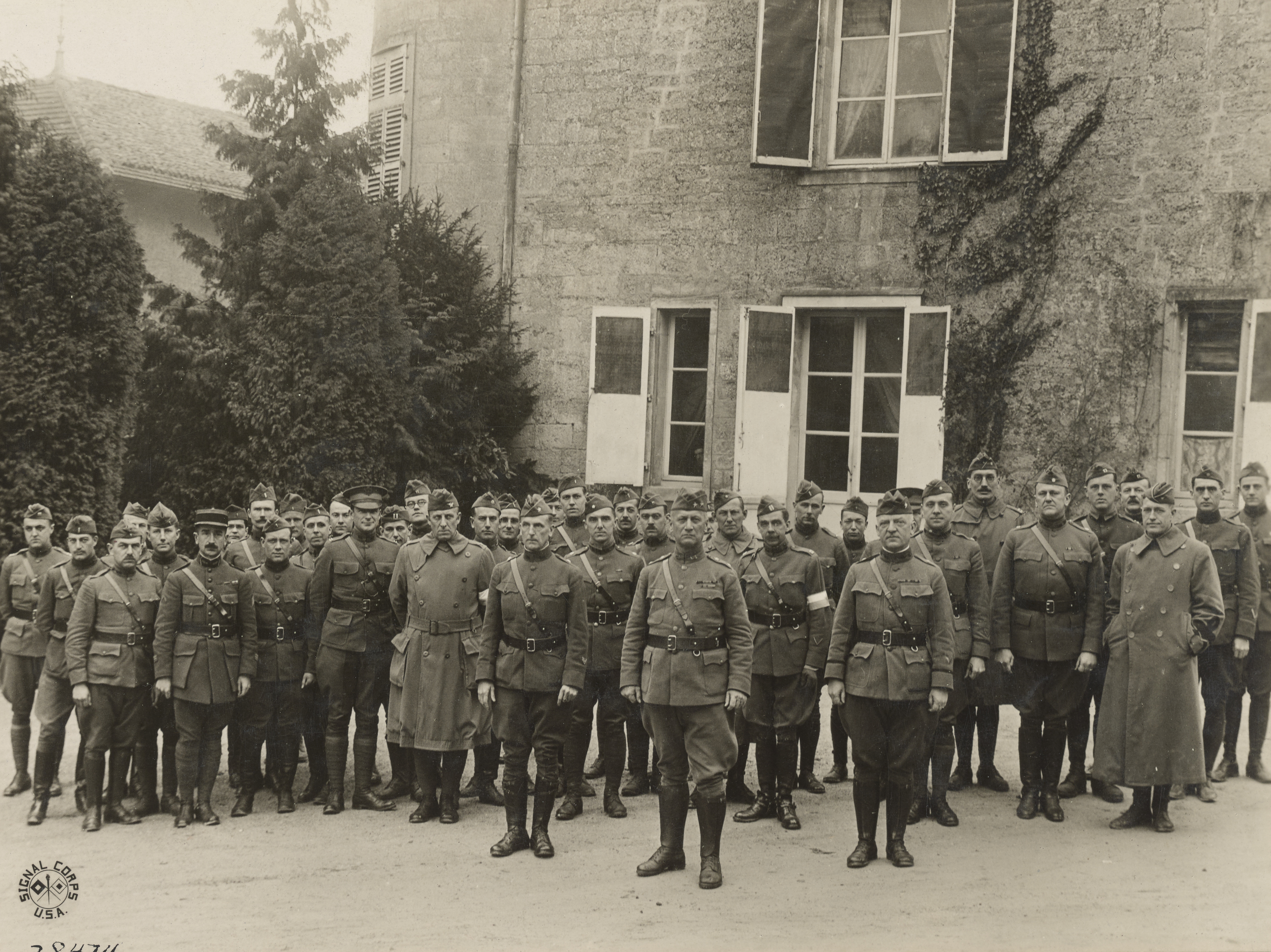
Major General Charles Henry Muir, the newly appointed commander of the U.S. IV Corps, pictured here with his staff at Boucq, Meuse, France, October 31, 1918. Stood to Muir's left is his chief of staff, Brigadier General Briant H. Wells, with Lieutenant Colonel James A. Ulio stood behind him.

After the American entry into World War I in April 1917, Ulio moved to Camp McClellan, Alabama, where he received a temporary promotion to major on 5 August 1917 and was assigned on 15 August as the division adjutant of the 29th Division until 26 February 1918. The following month, he embarked for France, where he attended the Army General Staff College of the American Expeditionary Forces (AEF) until 31 May. He was then assigned to the headquarters (HQ) of the 35th Division as its assistant chief of staff for personnel (G-1). In June, he was assigned to the newly organized IV Corps as its G-1 until 14 December, over a month after the armistice of 11 November 1918 that ended the fighting. He was promoted to the temporary rank of lieutenant colonel on 9 September.

In 1919 he received the Distinguished Service Medal for his service in this last assignment as well as honors from several allied governments. His citation read:

The President of the United States of America, authorized by Act of Congress, July 9, 1918, takes pleasure in presenting the Army Distinguished Service Medal to Lieutenant Colonel (Infantry) James A. Ulio (ASN: 0-1984), United States Army, for exceptionally meritorious and distinguished services to the Government of the United States, in a duty of great responsibility during the World War. As Assistant Chief of Staff, G-1, of the 4th Army Corps, Lieutenant Colonel Ulio showed marked organizing and administrative ability. By his tireless efforts and ceaseless energy, he contributed in a large degree to the successes achieved by the 4th Army Corps in the Toul sector and in the battles of the St. Mihiel salient. Later he handled with great success the evacuation and feeding of French civilians in the occupied territory recovered from the enemy, rendering invaluable services to the American Expeditionary Forces.

He was also awarded the French Legion of Honor and the Order of the Crown of Italy.

Ulio served with the Army of Occupation in Germany until August 1919. He then went to Armenia as chief of staff of Colonel William N. Haskell's American Relief Administration there. Ulio felt the Armenian people were opposed to communism, and the communist takeover in neighboring Azerbaijan was not a popular uprising but one engineered by Enver Pasha.

== Between the wars ==
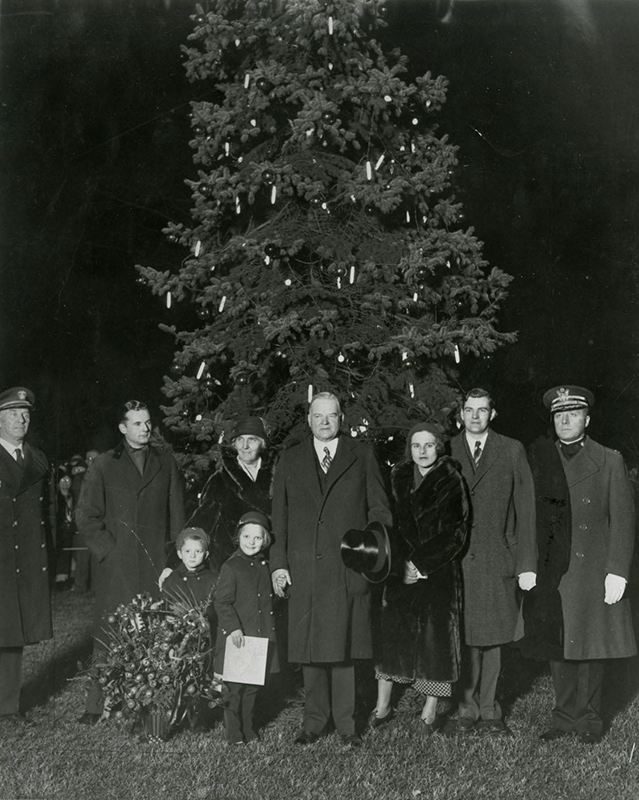
Ulio (right) with President Herbert Hoover (center) and his family in front of the National Christmas Tree on Christmas Day 1931

Ulio reverted to his permanent rank of captain on 19 April 1920 but was promoted to major, the highest rank his father had held, on 1 July. He served in the Office of the Adjutant General of the Army in Washington, D.C., and transferred from the infantry to the Adjutant General's Department on 1 May 1922. His duties concerned assisting the Veterans Bureau in reducing delays and ensuring that veterans received their vocational and health benefits.

In 1923, Ulio went to Greece for six months, where he served as chief of the administrative division of the American Red Cross. He was awarded the Greek Order of the Redeemer, Montenegrin Order of Prince Danilo I, Serbian Order of the White Eagle and the Panama Medal of Solidarity. He was then assigned as assistant to the G-1 on the headquarters staff of the II Corps Area at Fort Jay on Governors Island in New York City. In 1926, he returned to the Office of the Adjutant General of the Army. He was promoted to lieutenant colonel on 13 November 1927. From 8 September 1930 to 19 June 1931 he attended the Command and General Staff College in Fort Leavenworth. Fellow students included his boyhood friend Jonathan M. Wainwright.

After graduation, Ulio was again assigned to the Office of the Adjutant General of the Army until 1935. During this assignment, he served as a junior military aide-de-camp on the staff of the President of the United States, Herbert Hoover, and then on that of his successor, Franklin D. Roosevelt. The role was a largely ceremonial one; military aides had no input into policy. Ulio attended the Army War College at Carlisle Barracks, Pennsylvania, from 1933 to 1934. Fellow students included Omar Bradley, Ulysses S. Grant III, Ernest N. Harmon, Lewis Hershey, Courtney Hodges and Jonathan Wainwright, all of whom subsequently achieved general officer rank.

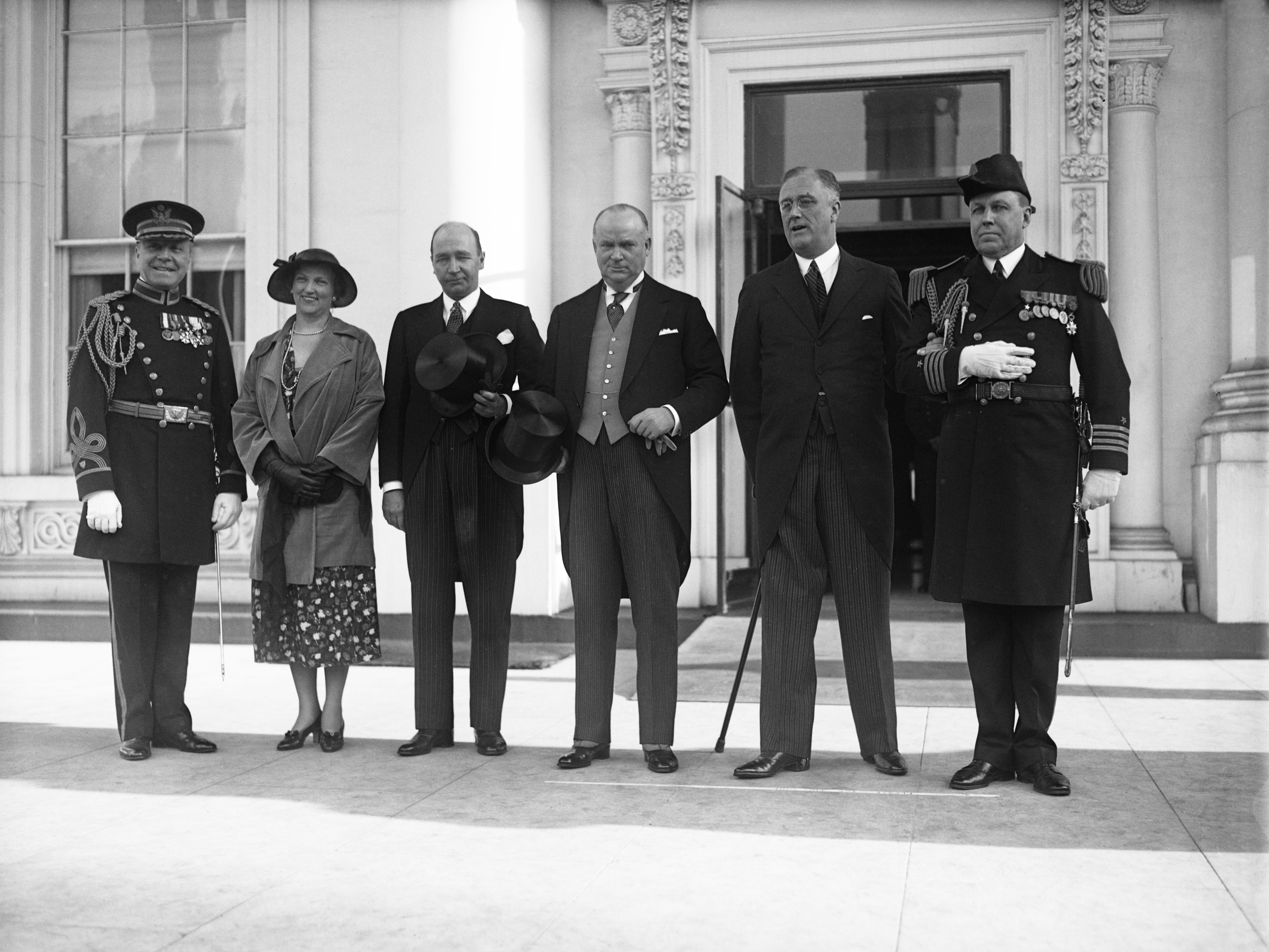
Ulio (left) at the White House in 1933, while serving as military aide to President Franklin D. Roosevelt (second from the right)

In June 1934, Ulio returned to the Office of the Adjutant General of the Army. He was assigned to the Hawaiian Department in February 1935 as aide-de-camp to the commanding general, Major General Hugh A. Drum. From June to September he headed the service command section responsible for planning for the contingency of a blockade of the islands, with the rank of colonel from 1 August. He then became chief of staff of the Hawaiian Department. He returned to Governors Island as G-1 of the II Corps Area, and, in May 1938, to the Office of the Adjutant General of the Army as an Assistant Adjutant General, one of three reporting to the Adjutant General, Major General Emory Sherwood Adams. Ulio was promoted to brigadier general on 28 December 1939.

== World War II ==
On 1 March 1942, Ulio became the Adjutant General with the rank of major general. As Adjutant General, he had overall responsibility for the classification and assignment of soldiers in an Army that would grow to 8.2 million by March 1945. The Office of the Adjutant General had 12,574 personnel assigned in June 1943, of whom about 9,000 were in Washington, D.C.

=== Induction ===
At the time of the attack on Pearl Harbor in December 1941 that brought the United States into the war, the Army, after fifteen months of peacetime mobilization, had 1.6 million soldiers. By 30 June 1942, it was already 162,505 men short. An early accomplishment was lowering the draft age from twenty to eighteen. Ulio began his push for this in October 1942. Advice from Major General Lewis B. Hershey, the Director of the Selective Service System, indicated that the country would run out of single and childless married men by 1 October 1943. In November 1942, Congress lowered the draft age to 18.

In May 1943, the chief of Army Ground Force, Lieutenant General Lesley J. McNair, foresaw the possibility of unfavorable public reaction if 18-year-olds were sent into combat with just 13 weeks' training, and suggested they be assigned to units training in the United States which were not scheduled to move overseas in the near future rather than to replacement training centers. The postponement of plans for an invasion of northwest Europe had created large numbers of such units. Ulio did not think this was practical, as the Army was nearly at its maximum size, and almost all new inductees were being sent to replacement training centers. As casualties mounted though, the War Department ordered in June 1944 that no 18-year-olds be sent overseas as infantry or armor replacements. This was also extended to men who had children conceived before the US declaration of war. Rising casualties soon forced this restriction to be dropped.

=== Classification ===
Soldiers inducted into the Army received a physical examination. One of Ulio's first directives was that every one would get a chest X-ray. Experience had shown that many inductees had tuberculosis, but the Army had previously not required X-rays on account of the cost, which had proven to be a false economy. The Army initially also rejected inductees with venereal diseases, but improved methods of treatment led to this being relaxed in 1943. Ulio personally signed an order on 21 May 1945 transferring Lieutenant Colonel Albert Sabin from the Army Medical Corps, where he had helped develop a vaccine against Japanese encephalitis, to the Cincinnati Children's Hospital, where he developed the oral polio vaccine.

Inductees were given mechanical, technical and clerical aptitude tests, and interviewed by personnel staff. Initially, attempts were made to place new recruits in roles depending on their skills, and nearly four in five were placed in a role similar to their civilian work. As the war went on this was seen as draining the best personnel away from the combat arms. In February 1944, the Army began to adopt the Physical Profile Plan, under which inductees were assessed on stamina, upper limbs, lower limbs, hearing, eyesight and emotional stability. In each category they were given a rating of 1 to 4. Grades 1 and 2 were considered qualified for general service; grade 3 as qualified for limited service; and grade 4 as unfit for service. The six numbers (in that order) together gave a personal profile serial. Those with serials of 211211 or better were Profile A, qualified for strenuous combat duty; those below 211211 down to 322231 were Profile B, qualified for service in combat areas; those below 322231 down to 333231 were Profile C, qualified for base duties. A 4 anywhere meant below the minimum standard. Different branches were assigned their own mix of the profile; the infantry, 86 percent of its recruits would be Profile A, 7 percent Profile B and 7 percent Profile C.

=== Casualty notification ===
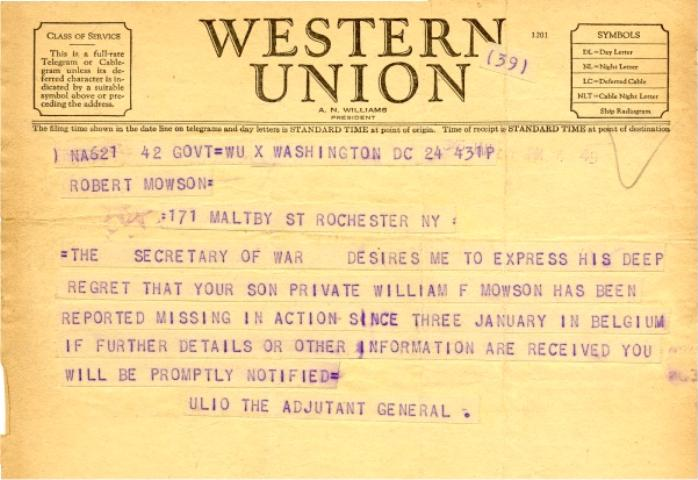
Western Union missing in action (MIA) telegram from Ulio

One of Ulio's most important roles was notifying families when their loved ones became casualties. By the war's end Casualty Branch in the Office of the Adjutant General consisted of 80 officers and 2,000 enlisted personnel. Every day it received punched cards from the theaters of operations. The staff then translated these into words. Other members then typed the information onto casualty forms. The soldier's emergency contact information was then verified; many people changed address without notifying the Army. If the soldier had died, the branch head, Colonel George F. Herbert, would review the paperwork. The Signal Corps then contacted Western Union and sent a telegram, which would go out under Ulio's name. Ulio directed that no telegrams would be delivered between 22:00 and 07:00. A confirmation letter would follow in the post. These were individualised; Ulio directed that no form letters would be sent to grieving families. During the war, 318,274 US soldiers were killed and 565,861 were wounded.

In the case of soldiers who were missing in action or held as a prisoner of war, pay and benefits would continue for twelve months. A follow up letter would provide whatever details were available. It was not unusual for missing soldiers and airmen to return. Updates would be sent no less frequently than every 90 days. The Casualty Branch tried to send notifications every three or four weeks. In the case of wounded soldiers, updates were sent immediately if the soldier's status changed. Families of wounded soldiers also received a message of cheer form. These messages had to be no more than five words long, and were sent by radiogram. Up to 6,000 telegrams were despatched each day. The Casualty Branch handled up to 1,300 calls per day. Callers seeking information about family members were asked for the soldier's name and serial number. The call center operators would pass this information on to searchers, who would retrieve the soldier's personnel file. The call would then be returned.

=== Life insurance ===
One of the newest responsibilities of the Adjutant General was the administration of the National Service Life Insurance scheme. This was enacted by Congress on 8 October 1940. Soldiers could buy up to $10,000 (equivalent to $229,810 in 2025) worth of life insurance in $500 lots. Premiums for $10,000 worth of insurance ranged from $6.70 (equivalent to $154 in 2025) a month for some aged 25 year old to $7.10 (equivalent to $163 in 2025) for someone aged 30 year old and $9.90 (equivalent to $228 in 2025) per month for someone aged 45. In the event of the policy holder's death it was payable in 120 or 240 monthly instalments of $5.51 (equivalent to $127 in 2025) payments for each $1,000 of insurance depending on whether the beneficiary was over or under 30 at the time. Fourteen million service personnel took out policies, and by January 1944 99 percent of officers and 98 percent of enlisted personnel signed up.

=== Correction ===
In 1944, Ulio became responsible for the supervision of the Army's penal system. A Correction Division was established in the Office of the Adjutant General. The Army operated two types of penal institutions: rehabilitation centers and disciplinary barracks. Soldiers convicted of offenses other than capital crimes and certain other major offenses were sent to rehabilitation centers where an attempt was made to rehabilitate them through rigorous physical and psychological training. Of the 34,209 prisoners admitted to rehabilitation centers during the war, about 13,940 were restored to duty and 10,562 were sent on to disciplinary barracks to serve out their sentences. By the war's end, 13,468 prisoners were held in disciplinary barracks.

=== Postal ===
The Adjutant General operated the Army Postal Service. Between March and June 1945, 2,000,000 pounds (910,000 kg) of mail was sent to the troops by air. The volume of surface mail sent by ship peaked at 1,700,000 pounds (770,000 kg) in January 1945, and parcel post at 1.7 million sacks in October 1944. V-mail was a means of sending mail whereby it was microfilmed before transmission. It was popular in the early war years when air mail services were few, and its use declined as air mail became more generally available. By April 1945 an air mail letter took an average of 10.2 days to reach Europe, and 7.3 days to reach the South Pacific.

== Later life ==
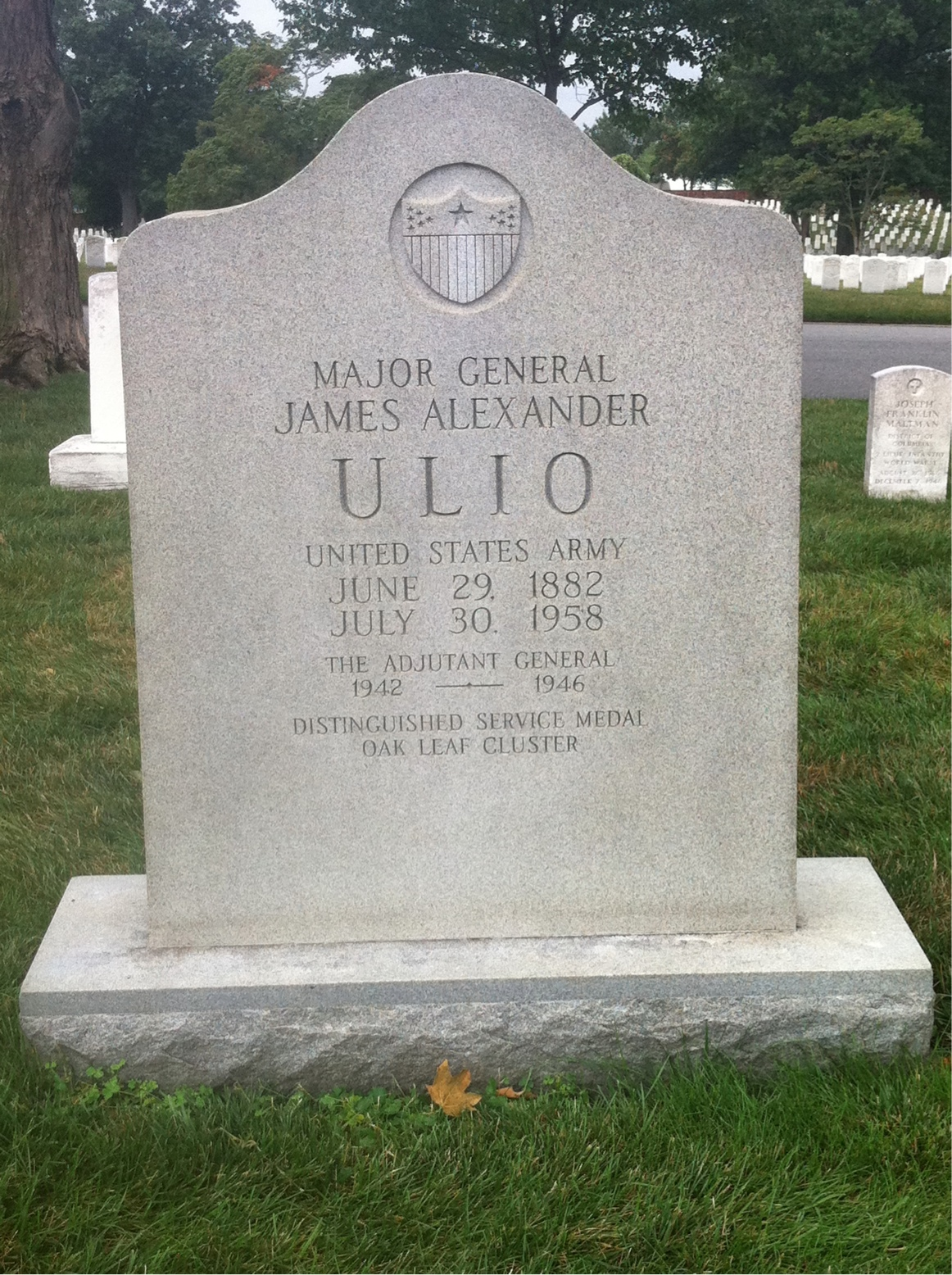
Grave at Arlington National Cemetery

Ulio retired from the Army on 21 January 1946, five months after the surrender of Japan and just before he reached the mandatory retirement age of 64. He was awarded a bronze oak leaf cluster to his Distinguished Service Medal "for exceptionally meritorious and distinguished services to the Government of the United States, in a duty of great responsibility."

Shortly before his retirement it was announced that Ulio would join Food Fair, a supermarket chain based in Philadelphia as its vice president. This allowed him to remain in Washington, D.C. He retired from Food Fair in 1949. During the 1950s he served on the board of the United Services Life Insurance Company.

In 1947, he testified at the trial of Congressman Andrew J. May from Kentucky. He testified that May had written to him in 1943 requesting a furlough for Sergeant Albert Freeman, whose father Joseph E. Freedman, was the Washington, D.C., representative of Garsson Brothers, a munitions firm that Federal prosecutors alleged had paid May $53,000 in bribes. Ulio had denied the request, and said that he had handled it like any one of the many he had received from members of the public each day.

Ulio never married. He died at his residence at the Army and Navy Club in Washington, D.C., on 30 July 1958, and was buried in Arlington National Cemetery.

== Dates of rank ==
Insignia	Rank	Component	Date	Reference
	Enlisted		1 September 1900	
No insignia in 1904	Second lieutenant	Infantry	5 October 1904	
	First lieutenant	Infantry	11 March 1911	
	Captain	Infantry	1 July 1916	
	Major (temporary)	Infantry	5 August 1917	
	Lieutenant colonel (temporary)	Infantry	9 September 1918	
	Captain (reverted)	Infantry	19 April 1920	
	Major	Infantry	1 July 1920	
	Major	Adjutant General's Department	1 May 1922	
	Lieutenant colonel	Adjutant General's Department	13 November 1927	
	Colonel	Adjutant General's Department	1 August 1935	
	Brigadier general	Regular Army	28 December 1939	
	Major general	Regular Army	1 March 1942	
	Major general	Retired List	31 January 1946	

== Notes ==
Military offices
Preceded by Emory S. Adams	Adjutant General of the U. S. Army; 1 March 1942–31 January 1946	Succeeded by Edward F. Witsell
