= Sydney F. Foster =

American judge

Sydney Francis Foster (March 23, 1893 Cazenovia, Madison County, New York – November 21, 1973) was an American lawyer and politician.

== Life ==
He graduated from Cazenovia Seminary in 1911, and LL.B. from Syracuse University College of Law in 1915. In 1916, he became a special deputy county clerk of Madison County, and was admitted to the bar in 1917. In 1918, he went overseas, serving for two years in the Department of the Judge Advocate General of the U.S. Army, and left the Army with the rank of sergeant. Afterwards he practiced law in Liberty, and was elected District Attorney of Sullivan County, New York, in 1925.

In 1928, he was elected to the New York Supreme Court (3rd District). He sat on the Appellate Division (3rd Dept.) from 1939 to 1942, and from 1944 on. He was Presiding Justice from 1949 on. In 1950, Syracuse University conferred an honorary degree of LL.D. on him.

In 1954, he ran on the Republican ticket for the New York Court of Appeals, but was defeated by Democrat/Liberal Adrian P. Burke.

On January 1, 1960, Foster was appointed to the Court of Appeals by Governor Nelson A. Rockefeller to fill the vacancy caused by the election of Charles S. Desmond as Chief Judge. In November 1960, Foster ran on the Republican and Liberal tickets to succeed himself, and was elected. He retired from the Court of Appeals at the end of 1963 when he reached the constitutional age limit of 70 years, and returned to the Supreme Court as a certificated trial justice until 1967.

He died from a heart attack.

== Sources ==
- The History of the New York Court of Appeals, 1932-2003 by Bernard S. Meyer, Burton C. Agata & Seth H. Agata (pages 24f)
- Court of Appeals judges
- SYDNEY F. FOSTER, A RETIRED JUDGE; Member of the State Court of Appeals Dead at 80 in NYT on November 23, 1973 (subscription required)
- History of the Third Department, with portrait (page 26)
- Bio at Court History
