= 1940 New York state election =

- November 5, 1940

The 1940 New York state election was held on November 5, 1940, to elect three judges of the New York Court of Appeals, a U.S. senator and two U.S representatives-at-large, as well as all members of the New York State Assembly and the New York State Senate.

== Background ==
After the increase of the gubernatorial term to four years, by an amendment to the State Constitution in 1937, this was the first presidential-election year without a gubernatorial election since 1892. From 1938 on, the New York gubernatorial elections have been held at the same time as the United States midterm elections.

In November 1939, Associate Judge Irving Lehman was elected Chief Judge of the New York Court of Appeals to take office on January 1, 1940. Republican Charles B. Sears was appointed to fill the vacancy temporarily. Sears reached the constitutional age limit at the end of 1940, and thus could not run for election.

On November 30, 1939, Associate Judge Irving G. Hubbs tendered his resignation effective December 31. Republican Edmund H. Lewis was appointed to fill the vacancy temporarily.

On December 7, 1939, Associate Judge John F. O'Brien tendered his resignation, due to ill health, effective December 31. He died on December 25, and Democrat Albert Conway was appointed to fill the vacancy temporarily.

== Nominations ==
The Socialist Labor state convention met on April 27 at the Cornish Arms Hotel at 311, West Twenty-third Street in New York City and nominated Emile Mass for the U.S. Senate; Aaron M. Orange and Jacob Berlin for Congress at-large; and O. Martin Olson, Bronko Papadopolos and Benjamin F. Orange for the Court of Appeals. However, the party did not gather enough signatures to file a petition to nominate candidates, and did not appear on the ballot.

The Prohibition Party filed a petition to nominate candidates for presidential electors and Congress only. They nominated Dr. Stephen W. Paine, President of Houghton College, for the U.S. Senate; and Neil D. Cranmer and Helen G.H. Estelle for Congress at-large.

The Republican state convention met on September 27 at White Plains, New York, and re-nominated the incumbents Lewis and Conway (Dem.); and Supreme Court Justice Benjamin B. Cunningham for the Court of Appeals; Congressman Bruce Barton for the U.S. Senate; and Messmore Kendall and Mary H. Donlon for Congress at-large.

The American Labor state convention met on September 28, and nominated Leo J. Rosett and Alexander Kahn for the Court of Appeals. They also endorsed Democrats Conway, Mead, Merritt and O'Day. Rosett and Kahn declined the nomination and withdrew in favor of Democrat Desmond and Republican Lewis.

The Democratic state convention met on September 30, and re-nominated the incumbents Lewis (Rep.), Conway, Mead, Merritt and O'Day; and completed the ticket with Supreme Court Justice Charles S. Desmond for the Court of Appeals.

== Result ==
The whole ticket nominated by Democrats and American Laborites was elected.

The incumbents Lewis, Conway, Mead, Merritt and O'Day were re-elected.

1940 state election results
Office	Democratic ticket		Republican ticket		American Labor ticket		Prohibition ticket	
Judge of the Court of Appeals	Edmund H. Lewis	2,282,512	Edmund H. Lewis	3,398,724	Edmund H. Lewis	369,465	(none)	
Judge of the Court of Appeals	Albert Conway	2,288,783	Albert Conway	3,392,593	Albert Conway	367,337	(none)	
Judge of the Court of Appeals	Charles S. Desmond	2,751,245	Benjamin B. Cunningham	2,840,747	Charles S. Desmond	426,202	(none)	
U.S. Senator	James M. Mead	2,893,407	Bruce Barton	2,868,252	James M. Mead	381,359	Stephen W. Paine	4,944
U.S. Representative-at-large	Caroline O'Day	2,831,398	Mary H. Donlon	2,830,517	Caroline O'Day	367,621	Helen G. H. Estelle	5,679
U.S. Representative-at-large	Matthew J. Merritt	2,821,216	Messmore Kendall	2,812,096	Matthew J. Merritt	361,720	Neil D. Cranmer	5,212

== See also ==
- New York state elections
- 1940 United States presidential election

== Sources ==
- Result (Law Preservation only): Vote for Prohibition candidates at Prohibitionists.org
