= Justice Conway =

Justice Conway may refer to:

- Albert Conway (1889–1969), justice of the New York Supreme Court, and judge and chief judge of the New York Court of Appeals
- William Conway (Arkansas judge) (1805–1852), associate justice of the Arkansas Supreme Court

== See also ==
- Judge Conway
