= 1954 New York state election =

- November 2, 1954

The 1954 New York state election was held on November 2, 1954, to elect the governor, the lieutenant governor, the state comptroller, the attorney general, the chief judge and three associate judges of the New York Court of Appeals, as well as all members of the New York State Assembly and the New York State Senate.

== Background ==
This was the first election in which the voters were required to cast a single joint vote for governor and lieutenant governor, following the amendment to the State Constitution in 1953.

Chief Judge Edmund H. Lewis would reach the constitutional age limit of 70 years at the end of the year. He was elected in 1953, and John Van Voorhis was re-appointed on January 1, 1954, to the seat vacated by Lewis, to fill the vacancy temporarily.

Albert Conway and Charles S. Desmond had been elected to the Court of Appeals in 1940, thus their 14-year terms would expire at the end of the year.

== Nominations ==
The Socialist Workers nominated David L. Weiss, electronics worker, for governor; Dorothy Haines, of Buffalo, for lieutenant governor; Harold Robins, of New York City, for comptroller; and Catherine Gratta (born c. 1922), machine inspector, of Brooklyn, for attorney general.

The American Labor Party nominated John T. McManus for governor; actress Karen Morley for lieutenant governor; Ralph Powe, lawyer, for Comptroller (the only African-American running for a statewide elective office this year); and George W. Fish, lawyer, of Brooklyn, for attorney general.

The Socialist Labor Party filed a petition to nominate candidates as the Industrial Government Party on September 30. The ticket had only three names: Nathan Karp for governor; Stephen Emery for lieutenant governor; and John Emanuel for comptroller.

The Democratic Party held its convention on September 21, 1954, in New York City. The main contest was for governor which was between former Secretary of Commerce W. Averell Harriman and Representative Franklin Delano Roosevelt Jr. Harriman had the backing of Tammany Hall and city organizations, Roosevelt agreed to drop out in exchange for his nomination for attorney general. The next week the Liberal Party of New York endorsed the entire Democratic slate.

== Result ==
Almost the whole Democratic/Liberal ticket was elected, only Republican Jacob K. Javits managed to be elected attorney general.

The incumbents Van Voorhis and Desmond were re-elected.

The American Labor Party lost its automatic ballot access and disbanded shortly afterwards.

1954 state election results
Office	Democratic ticket		Republican ticket		Liberal ticket		American Labor ticket		Socialist Workers ticket		Industrial Government ticket	
Governor	W. Averell Harriman	2,296,645	Irving M. Ives	2,549,613	W. Averell Harriman	264,093	John T. McManus	46,886	David L. Weiss	2,617	Nathan Karp	1,720
Lieutenant Governor	George B. DeLuca	2,296,645	J. Raymond McGovern	2,549,613	George B. DeLuca	264,093	Karen Morley	46,886	Dorothy Haines	2,617	Stephen Emery	1,720
Comptroller	Arthur Levitt	2,260,193	Frank Del Vecchio	2,490,184	Arthur Levitt	255,481	Ralph Powe	50,911	Harold Robins	3,569	John Emanuel	2,244
Attorney General	Franklin D. Roosevelt, Jr.	2,185,272	Jacob K. Javits	2,603,858	Franklin D. Roosevelt, Jr.	245,687	George W. Fish	44,287	Catherine Gratta	4,059		
Chief Judge	Albert Conway	2,263,688	Albert Conway	2,478,694	Albert Conway	261,153						
Judge of the Court of Appeals	Charles S. Desmond	2,256,907	Charles S. Desmond	2,459,319	Charles S. Desmond	259,498						
Judge of the Court of Appeals	John Van Voorhis	2,233,168	John Van Voorhis	2,450,362	George Rifkin	280,656						
Judge of the Court of Appeals	Adrian P. Burke	2,297,823	Sydney F. Foster	2,411,646	Adrian P. Burke	257,047						

Note: The vote for governor is used to define ballot access, for automatic access are necessary 50,000 votes.

== See also ==
- New York gubernatorial elections

== Sources ==
- Results in HARRIMAN MARGIN LOWEST SINCE 1850; Chosen Governor by 11,125 in Official Tally; All-Time Low in Race 108 in 1792 in NYT on December 17, 1954 (subscription required) [The headline refers to the New York state election, 1850, in which Washington Hunt defeated Horatio Seymour by 262 votes; and to the New York gubernatorial election, 1792 in which the incumbent Governor George Clinton was re-elected by 108 votes over John Jay, after the controversial exclusion of several hundred votes from three counties.]
- Results in the New York Red Book (1955)
