= Thomas W. Wallace =

American politician

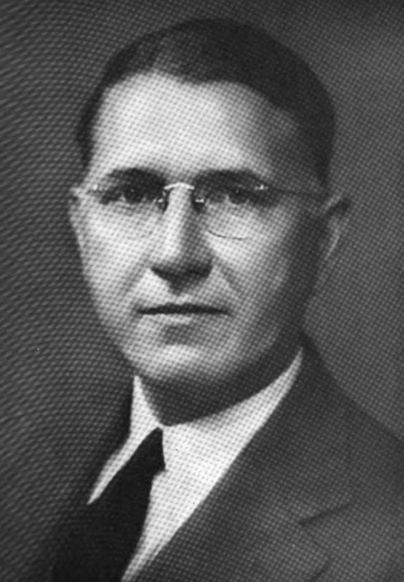

Thomas W. Wallace (January 24, 1900 – July 17, 1943) was an American lawyer and Republican politician. He served as lieutenant governor of New York in 1943, dying less than seven months into his only term.

He was corporation counsel of Schenectady, New York, and District Attorney of Schenectady County. At the 1942 New York state election, he defeated the incumbent Democrat, Lieutenant Governor Charles Poletti.

Wallace took office on January 1, 1943, as Lieutenant Governor of New York. In early July 1943, however, he contracted chicken pox from his two children. Two days later he began to suffer from pneumonia, and was placed in an oxygen tent at Ellis Hospital in Schenectady. His condition rapidly deteriorated, and he died on July 17, 1943. He was buried at the Holy Redeemer Cemetery in Niskayuna, New York.

== Political aftermath ==
His death raised the question of whether the revised State Constitution, adopted in 1938, required a special election to fill the vacancy. The New York Court of Appeals decided in the affirmative, meeting with harsh criticism from Governor Dewey. An amendment to the State Constitution in 1937 had increased the New York State Assemblymen's term to two years and the State Senators had already been elected to two-year terms in even-numbered years since 1898, so that now in odd-numbered years there were usually only local offices to be filled at the general election in November. Despite Dewey's objections, a statewide special election was held in November 1943. On recommendation of Governor Dewey, the Legislature passed, and the voters approved, a constitutional amendment which prohibited any elections for lieutenant governor in any event except at the time of the election of a governor.

Party political offices
Preceded by Frederic H. Bontecou	Republican nominee for Lieutenant Governor of New York; 1942	Succeeded by Joe R. Hanley
Political offices
Preceded by Joe R. Hanley; Acting	Lieutenant Governor of New York; 1943	Succeeded by Joe R. Hanley; Acting
