= 1959 New York state election =

- November 3, 1959

The 1959 New York state election was held on November 3, 1959, to elect the Chief Judge of the New York Court of Appeals.

Chief Judge Albert Conway would reach the constitutional age limit of 70 years at the end of the year.

== Nominations ==
Both Democrats and Republicans nominated Charles S. Desmond, the senior associate judge of the Court of Appeals, to succeed Conway.

== Result ==
Charles Desmond was elected without opposition.

1959 state election result
Office	Republican ticket		Democratic ticket		Liberal ticket	
Chief Judge	Charles S. Desmond	2,092,694	Charles S. Desmond	2,080,744	Charles S. Desmond	220,701

== See also ==
- New York state elections

== Notes ==
Desmond's total vote was 4,394,139

Vote totals from New York Red Book 1960
