= 1960 New York state election =

- November 8, 1960

The 1960 New York state election was held on November 8, 1960, to elect two judges of the New York Court of Appeals, as well as all members of the New York State Assembly and the New York State Senate.

== Background ==
In 1959, Charles S. Desmond had been elected Chief Judge. In January 1960, Presiding Justice Sydney F. Foster, of the Appellate Division (Third Dept.), was appointed by Governor Nelson A. Rockefeller to fill temporarily the seat vacated by Desmond.

Stanley H. Fuld had been elected to the Court of Appeals in 1946. Thus his fourteen-year term would expire at the end of 1960.

== Nominations ==
The Republican State Committee met on September 12 at Albany, New York, and re-nominated the incumbents Fuld and Foster.

The Democratic State Committee met on September 12 at Albany, New York, and endorsed the incumbent Republican Stanley H. Fuld for re-election, and nominated Supreme Court Justice Henry L. Ughetta for the other vacancy.

On September 13, the Liberal Party endorsed the Republican/Democratic nominee Fuld, and nominated Supreme Court Justice Benjamin Brenner for the other vacancy. On September 18, Brenner declined to run. On September 19, the Liberals also endorsed the other Republican nominee Foster.

== Result ==
The incumbents Fuld and Foster were re-elected.

1960 state election result
Office	Republican ticket		Democratic ticket		Liberal ticket	
Judge of the Court of Appeals	Stanley H. Fuld	3,292,416	Stanley H. Fuld	3,243,243	Stanley H. Fuld	403,454
Judge of the Court of Appeals	Sydney F. Foster	3,269,626	Henry L. Ughetta	3,251,504	Sydney F. Foster	423,035

Obs.: Fuld's total vote was 6,939,113.

== See also ==
- New York state elections
- 1960 United States presidential election

== Sources ==
- Official result: LIBERAL AID HERE WON FOR KENNEDY; Without the Party's 406,167 Votes, He Would Have Lost, Official Canvass Shows in NYT on December 13, 1960 (subscription required)

== Notes ==
Totals from New York State Red Book 1961
