= Judge Conway =

Judge Conway may refer to:

- Albert Conway (1889–1969), judge of the New York Court of Appeals
- Anne C. Conway (born 1950), judge of the United States District Court for the Middle District of Florida
- Byron B. Conway (born 1976), judge of the United States District Court for the Eastern District of Wisconsin
- John Edwards Conway (1934–2014), judge of the United States District Court for the District of New Mexico

== See also ==
- Justice Conway
