= Charlie McAuliffe =

American football coach (1895–1983)

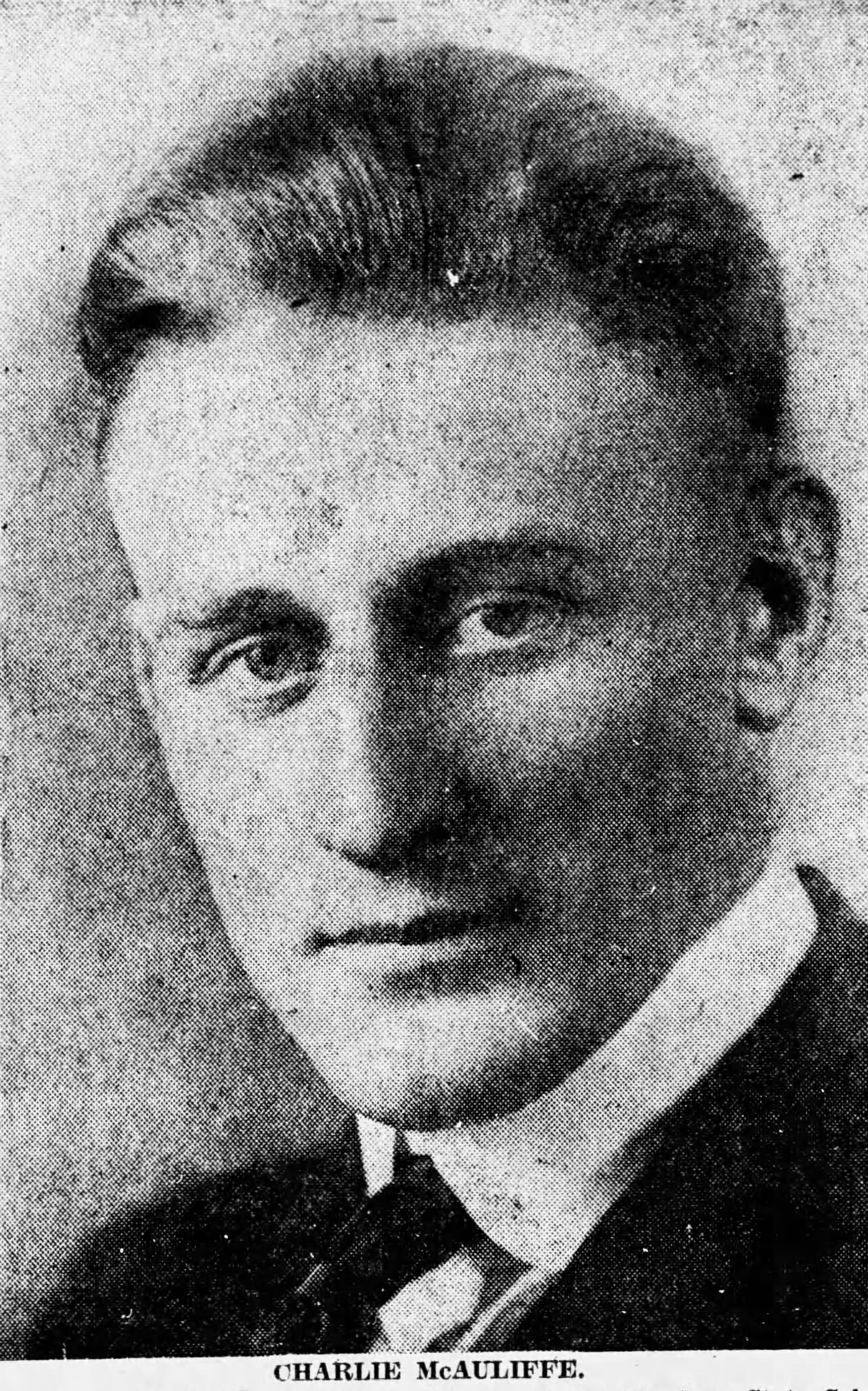
- Charlie McAuliffe, 1923

Biographical details
- Born: November 25, 1895; Butte, Montana, U.S.
- Died: August 8, 1983 (aged 87); Spokane, Washington, U.S.

Coaching career (HC unless noted)

Football
- 1921–1922: Custer County HS (MT)
- 1923–1947: Montana Mines

Administrative career (AD unless noted)
- 1935–?: Montana Mines

Daniel Charles McAuliffe (November 25, 1895 – August 8, 1983) was an American college football coach and university administrator. He was associated with Montana School of Mines—now known as Montana Technological University—for 43 years, from 1923 to 1966, holding posts including football and basketball coach, athletic director, mathematics instructor, dean, and vice president.

== Early years ==
McAuliffe was born in Butte, Montana, in 1895. He attended Butte High School, where he competed for the football and basketball teams, set an interscholastic record in the pole vault, and graduated in 1914. He then enrolled at the Montana School of Mines—now known as Montana Technological University (Montana Tech)—where he competed in football, baseball, and track before receiving a degree in mining engineering in 1920.

During World War I, McAuliffe served with the 16th Infantry Regiment of the United States Army in France from 1917 to 1919. He was wounded twice in action, was credited with destroying a German machine gun nest, and received the Distinguished Service Cross and the Croix de Guerre.

After graduating from Montana Mines, McAuliffe worked in various mining jobs and then as a surveyor in Rosebud County, Montana. In 1921, he became a coach and mathematics teacher at Custer County High School in Miles City, Montana. He led Custer to a Montana state football championship in 1922 and a state basketball championship in 1923.

== Coach and administrator at Montana Tech ==
In September 1923, McAuliffe was hired by Montana Mines as a descriptive geometry teacher and coach. He was the head football coach for the Montana Mines Orediggers football team from 1923 to 1947. He was associated with Montana Tech for 47 years from 1923 to 1966. He became the school's athletic director in 1935 and added responsibilities as dean and vice president in 1956.

== Death and honors ==
McAuliffe died at the Veterans Hospital in Spokane, Washington, in 1983 at age 87. He was inducted into the Montana Tech Sports Hall of Fame in 1987.
