= 1943 New York state election =

- November 2, 1943

The 1943 New York state election was held on November 2, 1943, to elect the Lieutenant Governor and a judge of the New York Court of Appeals.

== Background ==
On April 30, 1943, Edward R. Finch resigned from the Court of Appeals. On May 12, Governor Thomas E. Dewey appointed Thomas D. Thacher to fill the vacancy temporarily.

On July 17, 1943, Lieutenant Governor Thomas W. Wallace died, and Temporary President of the State Senate Joe R. Hanley became Acting Lieutenant Governor. The question arose if the vacancy should be filled and how to proceed. The wording of the 1937 amendment to the State Constitution, which had increased the terms in office of the assemblymen to two years, and of the statewide elected officers (Governor, Lt. Gov., Comptroller and Attorney General) to four years, apparently left the question in doubt. The New York Supreme Court at Albany ruled on August 14 that a special election needed to be held. This was upheld by the Court of Appeals unanimously on August 19.

== Nominations ==
The Republican State Committee met on August 24 at Albany, New York. They nominated Joe R. Hanley for Lieutenant Governor; and the incumbent Judge Thomas D. Thacher to succeed himself.

The Democratic State Committee met on August 24. They nominated Lt. Gen. William N. Haskell for Lieutenant Governor; and endorsed the incumbent Republican Judge Thomas D. Thacher for the Court of Appeals.

The American Labor State Committee met on August 21 at the Hotel Claridge in New York City and tentatively nominated Ex-State Comptroller Joseph V. O'Leary (in office 1941–42) for Lieutenant Governor, and Leo J. Rosett for the Court of Appeals. The committee met again on August 25 and endorsed the Democratic nominee Haskell and the Republican and Democratic nominee Thacher.

== Result ==
The Republican ticket was elected.

This was the last special election for Lieutenant Governor.

1943 state election result
Office	Republican ticket		Democratic ticket		American Labor ticket	
Lieutenant Governor	Joe R. Hanley	1,846,314	William N. Haskell	1,171,976	William N. Haskell	321,106
Judge of the Court of Appeals	Thomas D. Thacher	1,830,645	Thomas D. Thacher	1,030,385	Thomas D. Thacher	316,449

== Aftermath ==
Governor Dewey criticized the ruling of the Court of Appeals, saying that the special election of a lieutenant governor was incompatible with the 1937 amendment. To press his view, he recommended to the New York State Legislature to amend the State Constitution again. In November 1945, an amendment was adopted which prohibited special elections for lieutenant governor saying that "no election of a lieutenant governor shall be had in any event, except at the time of electing a governor," and that "the temporary president of the senate then in office or his successor as such temporary president shall perform all the duties of lieutenant-governor...during such vacancy..."

== See also ==
- New York state elections
