= 1946 New York state election =

- November 5, 1946

The 1946 New York state election was held on November 5, 1946, to elect the governor, the lieutenant governor, the state comptroller, the attorney general, a U.S. senator, the chief judge and an associate judge of the New York Court of Appeals, as well as all members of the New York State Assembly and the New York State Senate.

== Background ==
On September 22, 1945, Chief Judge Irving Lehman died. On September 28, Judge John T. Loughran was appointed Chief Judge to fill the vacancy temporarily, and George Z. Medalie was appointed temporarily to the seat vacated by Loughran. On March 5, 1946, Medalie died too, and Stanley H. Fuld was appointed on April 25 to fill the vacancy temporarily.

== Nominations ==
The Socialist Labor state convention met on April 7, and nominated Aaron M. Orange for Governor. They also nominated Nathan Karp for Lieutenant Governor; Bronko Papadopolos, of Buffalo, for Comptroller; Walter Steinhilber, of Queens, for Attorney General; and Eric Hass for the U.S. Senate. The party filed a petition to nominate candidates under the name "Industrial Government Party."

The Socialist state convention met on April 14, and nominated Prof. Coleman B. Cheney for Governor; and Walter O'Hagan for Lieutenant Governor.

The Liberal Party gathered 51,015 signatures and filed a petition to nominate candidates with the Secretary of State on September 2.

The Republican state convention met on September 4 at Saratoga Springs, New York. They re-nominated the five Republican incumbents Dewey, Hanley, Moore, Goldstein and Fuld; endorsed the Democratic Chief Judge Loughran to succeed himself; and completed the ticket with Assembly Majority Leader Irving M. Ives for the U.S. Senate.

The Democratic state convention met on September 4 at Albany, New York, and nominated U.S. Senator James M. Mead for Governor; Mayor of Albany Erastus Corning 2nd for Lieutenant Governor; New York City Treasurer Spencer C. Young for Comptroller; City Councilman Anthony J. DiGiovanna for Attorney General; Ex-Governor Herbert H. Lehman (in office 1933–1942) for the U.S. Senate; Ex-State Solicitor General Henry Epstein for the Court of Appeals; and the incumbent Chief Judge John T. Loughran to succeed himself.

Hyman Blumberg, New York State Chairman of the American Labor Party, announces election returns on WMCA, November 5, 1946

The American Labor state convention met on September 3 and endorsed the Democratic nominee James M. Mead for Governor; and also endorsed the Democrats Lehman and Loughran. They completed the ticket with Benjamin F. Fielding, of New York City, for Lieutenant Governor; Harry J. Chapman, of Brooklyn, for Comptroller; Joseph Lucchi, of Queens, for Attorney General; and John Abt for the Court of Appeals. Fielding, Chapman and Abt were withdrawn from the ticket on September 5, and Democrats Corning, Young and Epstein substituted on the ticket. Lucchi declined to run on September 7, and Democrat DiGiovanna was substituted on the ticket.

Communist Party leaders review election returns at the Hotel McAlpin, November 7, 1946 Left to right: Si Gerson, Robert G. Thompson, Israel Amter, Benjamin J. Davis Jr.

The Communist Party filed a petition to nominate candidates on September 2. They nominated Party State Chairman Robert G. Thompson for Governor; Israel Amter for Lieutenant Governor; Benjamin J. Davis, Jr., of New York City, for the U.S. Senate; Dr. Bella V. Dodd for Attorney General; and Marie Guidoni for Comptroller. On September 9, Thompson announced that all candidates except himself for Comptroller would be withdrawn in an effort to strengthen the Democratic candidates in their quest to oust Governor Dewey, but Davis also remained on the ticket, running for Attorney General. On October 19, Supreme Court Justice William H. Murray denied an application by Spencer C. Young, the Democratic nominee for Comptroller, to bar the Communist ticket from the ballot.

The Socialist Workers Party filed a petition to nominate candidates headed by Farrell Dobbs for Governor.

The Industrial Government, Socialist and Socialist Workers tickets were not allowed on the ballot because of "defective nominating petitions." The Court of Appeals upheld the decisions of the lower courts.

== Result ==
The whole Republican ticket was elected in a landslide.

The incumbents Dewey, Hanley, Moore, Goldstein, Loughran and Fuld were re-elected.

The Liberal Party attained automatic ballot access (necessary 50,000 votes for governor).

1946 state election results
Office	Republican ticket		Democratic ticket		American Labor ticket		Liberal ticket		Communist ticket	
Governor	Thomas E. Dewey	2,825,633	James M. Mead	1,532,161	James M. Mead	428,903	James M. Mead	177,418	(none)	
Lieutenant Governor	Joe R. Hanley	2,737,406	Erastus Corning 2nd	1,480,185	Erastus Corning 2nd	413,921	Erastus Corning 2nd	169,909	(none)	
Comptroller	Frank C. Moore	2,712,341	Spencer C. Young	1,481,325	Spencer C. Young	343,290	Spencer C. Young	159,283	Robert G. Thompson	85,098
Attorney General	Nathaniel L. Goldstein	2,629,561	Anthony J. DiGiovanna	1,532,061	Anthony J. DiGiovanna	337,906	Anthony J. DiGiovanna	153,290	Benjamin J. Davis, Jr.	95,798
Chief Judge	John T. Loughran	2,663,492	John T. Loughran	1,485,723	John T. Loughran	409,063	John T. Loughran	168,648	(none)	
Judge of the Court of Appeals	Stanley H. Fuld	2,671,869	Henry Epstein	1,456,900	Henry Epstein	410,750	Henry Epstein	169,686	(none)	
U.S. Senator	Irving M. Ives	2,559,363	Herbert H. Lehman	1,688,887	Herbert H. Lehman	435,846	Herbert H. Lehman	183,379	(none)	

Obs.:

- "Blank, void and scattering" votes: 178,694 (Senator)
- The vote for Governor is used to define ballot access, for automatic access are necessary 50,000 votes.

== See also ==
- New York gubernatorial elections
- New York state elections

== Sources ==
- Official Result: RECORD FOR DEWEY IN OFFICIAL COUNT; His 687,151 Majority Topped Lehman's 627,388 in 1932; Won in 1942 by 173,254 in NYT on December 14, 1946 (subscription required)

New York State Red Book 1947
