= 1953 New York state election =

- November 3, 1953

The 1953 New York state election was held on November 3, 1953, to elect the Chief Judge of the New York Court of Appeals. Besides, nine amendments to the State Constitution, among them one that required the voter to cast a single joint vote for the candidates for Governor and Lieutenant Governor on any ticket, were proposed, and all were accepted by the electorate.

== Background ==
On March 31, 1953, Chief Judge John T. Loughran died. On April 22, Governor Thomas E. Dewey appointed Judge Edmund H. Lewis to fill the vacancy temporarily. On April 23, Dewey appointed John Van Voorhis temporarily to the seat vacated by Lewis.

== Result ==
The appointed incumbent Chief Judge Lewis was elected. This required another election the next year, since Lewis would reach the constitutional age limit of 70 years at the end of 1954.

1953 state election result
Office	Republican		Democratic		American Labor	
Chief Judge	Edmund H. Lewis	1,983,220	Edmund H. Lewis	1,784,614	Edward Kuntz	65,035

Obs.: "Blank, void and scattering" votes: 853,875

== See also ==
- New York state elections
- 1953 New York City mayoral election

== Sources ==
- Official result: 9 AMENDMENTS APPROVED; But State's Voters Generally Cast Blanks or Void Ballots in NYT on December 16, 1953 (subscription required)
