= Office of Civilian Defense =

US federal wartime agency 1941 to 1945

Agency overview
- Formed: May 20, 1941; 85 years ago
- Dissolved: June 4, 1945; 80 years ago
- Superseding agency: Federal Civil Defense Administration
- Jurisdiction: Federal government of the United States
- Headquarters: 2000 Massachusetts Ave, Washington, D.C.
- Employees: 75
- Key documents: Executive Order 8757; Executive Order 9562

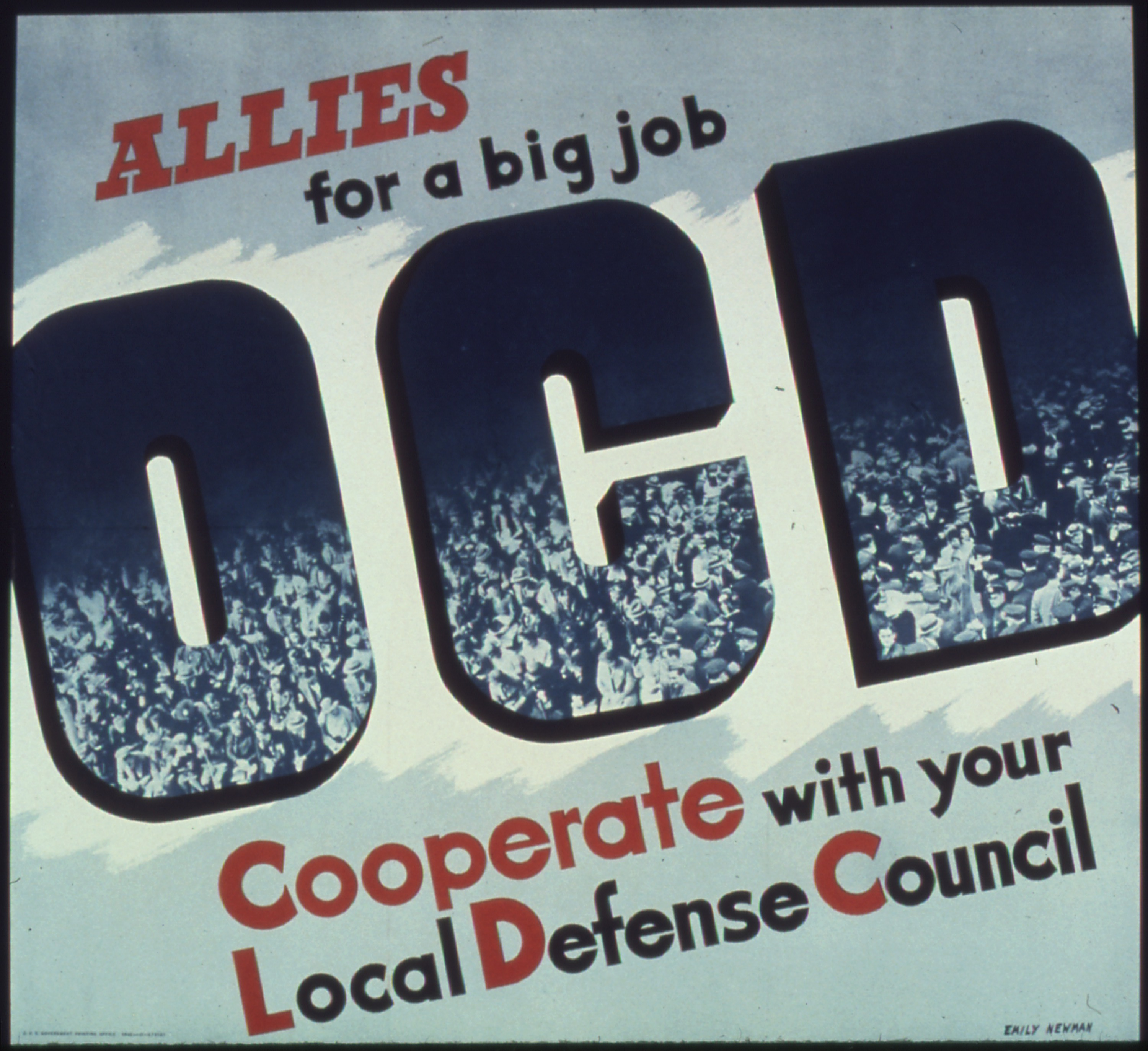
Allies for a big job, Office for Emergency Management. Office of War Information, 1941–1945

The Office of Civilian Defense was a United States federal emergency war agency set up May 20, 1941, by Executive Order 8757 to co-ordinate state and federal measures for protection of civilians in case of war emergency. Its two branches supervised protective functions such as blackouts and special fire protection and "war service" functions such as child care, health, housing, and transportation. It also created the Civil Air Patrol. The agency was terminated by Executive Order 9562 of June 4, 1945. The Office of Civil Defense with similar duties was established later.

Fiorello La Guardia was the first head of the office, succeeded in 1942 by James M. Landis, followed in 1944 by General William N. Haskell. While the agency only had a paid staff of 75, it supervised and coordinated the efforts of civilian volunteers estimated to have topped 11 million. Volunteer tasks included firefighting and air-raid preparedness. Children, under adult supervision, could volunteer in the Junior Citizens Service Corps, and were especially helpful in wartime scrap drives.

== Director ==
Denotes acting capacity.

Name	Start	End	President(s)
Fiorello La Guardia	May 20, 1941	February 11, 1942	Franklin D. Roosevelt (1933–1945)
James Landis	February 12, 1942	April 15, 1942	Franklin D. Roosevelt (1933–1945)
James Landis	April 15, 1942	September 8, 1943	Franklin D. Roosevelt (1933–1945)
John Martin; Acting	September 8, 1943	March 10, 1944	Franklin D. Roosevelt (1933–1945)
William Haskell	March 10, 1944	June 4, 1945	Franklin D. Roosevelt (1933–1945)
William Haskell	March 10, 1944	June 4, 1945	Harry S. Truman (1945–1953)

== See also ==
- Gilbert A. Harrison, chairman of the Youth Division
- Lorenzo D. Gasser, U.S. Army major general, War Department liaison to OCD, later assistant director in charge of civilian protection.
- United States civil defense
