= Joe R. Hanley =

American politician

Joe Hanley
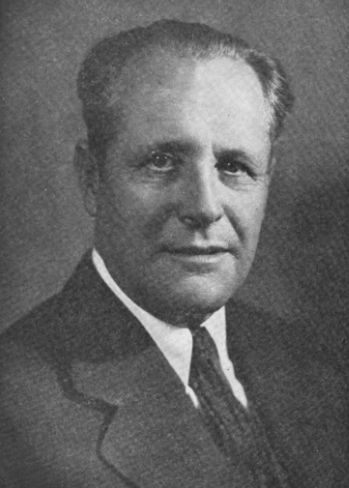

Lieutenant Governor of New York
- In office Acting; December 3, 1942 – December 31, 1942
- Governor: Charles Poletti
- Preceded by: Charles Poletti
- Succeeded by: Thomas W. Wallace
- In office Acting; July 17, 1943 – November 2, 1943
- Governor: Thomas E. Dewey
- Preceded by: Thomas W. Wallace
- Succeeded by: Himself
- In office November 2, 1943 – December 31, 1950
- Governor: Thomas E. Dewey
- Preceded by: Himself (acting)
- Succeeded by: Frank C. Moore

Member of the New York Senate from the 44th district
- In office January 1, 1932 – December 31, 1943
- Preceded by: John Knight
- Succeeded by: Austin W. Erwin

Member of the New York State Assembly from the Wyoming district
- In office January 1, 1927 – December 31, 1931
- Preceded by: Webb A. Joiner
- Succeeded by: Harold C. Ostertag

Personal details
- Born: Joseph Rhodes Hanley; May 30, 1876 Davenport, Iowa, U.S.
- Died: September 4, 1961 (aged 85) Warsaw, New York, U.S.
- Party: Republican
- Education: State University of Iowa (LLB); Iowa Wesleyan University (MDiv)

Military service
- Branch/service: United States Army
- Battles/wars: Spanish–American War

Joseph Rhodes Hanley (May 30, 1876 – September 4, 1961) was an American lawyer, preacher, and politician who served as lieutenant governor of New York from 1943 to 1950.

== Early life and education ==
Hanley was born in Davenport, Iowa, and raised in Muscatine, Iowa. He earned a law degree from the State University of Iowa. He later earned a Master of Divinity from Iowa Wesleyan University.

=== Military service ===
Hanley was a member of the Iowa National Guard and served in the United States Army during the Spanish–American War. In 1941 and 1942, he was Commander-in-Chief of the United Spanish War Veterans.

== Career ==
After the Spanish–American War, Hanley left Iowa and became a Presbyterian preacher. He moved to Perry, New York, to become the pastor of a local church. While living in Perry, Hanley became involved in local Republican politics.

He was a member of the New York State Assembly (Wyoming County) in 1927, 1928, 1929, 1930 and 1931, and a member of the New York State Senate (44th District) from 1932 to 1943, sitting in the 155th, 156th, 157th, 158th, 159th, 160th, 161st, 162nd, 163rd and 164th New York State Legislatures. After the death of Perley A. Pitcher, Hanley was elected Temporary President of the State Senate on February 27, 1939. When Charles Poletti succeeded to the governor's office upon Herbert H. Lehman's resignation in December 1942, Hanley became acting lieutenant governor of New York for four weeks.

When Lieutenant Governor Thomas W. Wallace died on July 17, 1943, Hanley again became acting lieutenant governor. In the 1943 New York state election, he defeated Democrat William N. Haskell in a special election for lieutenant governor. He was reelected in 1946 and remained in office until the end of 1950. He was a delegate to the 1944 and 1948 Republican National Conventions.

Early in 1950, Governor Thomas E. Dewey announced he would not seek another term as governor. Hanley was the leading candidate to succeed him. Then Dewey decided to run after all and was reelected. For the record, Hanley claimed he had bowed out of the campaign voluntarily to clear the way for Dewey. But, in a "Dear King" letter to W. Kingsland Macy, Hanley said Dewey had persuaded him to run for United States Senate instead, and had promised him a state job if he lost the race. He lost the senate race and was appointed special counsel to the State Division of Veterans' Affairs.

New York State Assembly
Preceded by Webb A. Joiner	New York State Assembly; Wyoming County; 1927–1931	Succeeded by Harold C. Ostertag
New York State Senate
Preceded by John Knight	New York State Senate; 44th District; 1932–1943	Succeeded by Austin W. Erwin
Political offices
Preceded by Perley A. Pitcher	Temporary President of the New York State Senate; 1939–1943	Succeeded by Benjamin F. Feinberg
Preceded by Charles Poletti	Lieutenant Governor of New York; Acting; 1942	Succeeded by Thomas W. Wallace
Preceded by Thomas W. Wallace	Lieutenant Governor of New York; Acting; 1943	Succeeded by Himself
Preceded by Himself; Acting	Lieutenant Governor of New York; 1943–1950	Succeeded by Frank C. Moore
Party political offices
Preceded by Thomas W. Wallace	Republican nominee for Lieutenant Governor of New York; 1943, 1946	Succeeded by Frank C. Moore
Preceded by John Foster Dulles (1949)	Republican Nominee for U.S. Senator from New York (Class 3); 1950	Succeeded by Jacob K. Javits (1956)
