= 1944 New York state election =

- November 7, 1944

The 1944 New York state election was held on November 7, 1944, to elect a judge of the New York Court of Appeals and a U.S. senator, as well as all members of the New York State Assembly and the New York State Senate.

== Nominations ==
The Socialist Labor state convention met on April 2 at the Cornish Arms Hotel, the corner of Eighth Avenue and Twenty-eighth Street, in New York City. They nominated Eric Hass for the U.S. Senate; and Walter Steinhilber, a "commercial artist," for the Court of Appeals. At that time, the party used the name "Industrial Government Party" on the ballot, but was also referred to as the "Industrial Labor Party".

The Liberal Party was organized by a state convention with about 1,100 delegates who met on May 19 and 20 at the Roosevelt Hotel in New York City. They endorsed the incumbent Democratic U.S. Senator Robert F. Wagner for re-election. The party filed a petition to nominate candidates which was allowed by Secretary of State Curran on August 25.

The Republican State Committee met on August 8 at Albany, New York. They nominated Secretary of State Thomas J. Curran for the U.S. Senate; and Supreme Court justice John Van Voorhis for the Court of Appeals.

The Democratic State Committee met on August 8 at the National Democratic Club at 233, Madison Avenue in New York City. They re-nominated the incumbent U.S. Senator Robert F. Wagner; and nominated Court of Claims judge Marvin R. Dye for the Court of Appeals.

The American Labor state convention met on August 10. They endorsed the Democratic nominees Wagner and Dye.

== Result ==
The Democratic/American Labor/Liberal ticket was elected. The incumbent Wagner was re-elected.

Office	Democratic ticket		Republican ticket		American Labor ticket		Liberal ticket		Industrial Government ticket	
Judge of the Court of Appeals	Marvin R. Dye	2,377,818	John Van Voorhis	2,926,528	Marvin R. Dye	467,498	Marvin R. Dye	314,397	Walter Steinhilber	16,706
U.S. Senator	Robert F. Wagner	2,485,735	Thomas J. Curran	2,899,497	Robert F. Wagner	483,785	Robert F. Wagner	325,056	Eric Hass	15,244

== See also ==
- New York state elections
- 1944 United States presidential election
