= 1923 New York state election =

- November 6, 1923

The 1923 New York state election was held on November 6, 1923, to elect a judge of the New York Court of Appeals, as well as all members of the New York State Assembly.

== History ==
In 1923, there was only one state officer to be elected statewide: a judge of the Court of Appeals, to succeed John W. Hogan, who would reach the constitutional age limit at the end of the year.

The Democratic State Committee met on September 28. Supreme Court Justice Irving Lehman was nominated for the Court of Appeals unanimously.

The Republican State Committee met on September 29. The Democratic nominee, Supreme Court Justice Irving Lehman, was endorsed for the Court of Appeals.

== Result ==
The jointly nominated candidate was elected.

1923 state election result
Office	Democratic ticket		Republican ticket	Socialist ticket	
Judge of the Court of Appeals	Irving Lehman	2,026,867	Irving Lehman	Jacob Panken	145,943

== See also ==
- New York state elections
