= J. Eugene Zimmer =

American politician

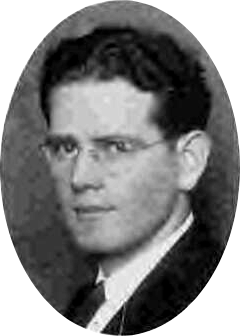
Zimmer c. 1941

Joseph Eugene Zimmer (May 16, 1912 – July 1, 1995) was an American politician from New York.

== Life ==
He was born on May 16, 1912, in Troy, Rensselaer County, New York. He attended Public School No. 14, St. Francis School, and Troy High School.

Zimmer was a member of the New York State Assembly (Rensselaer Co., 1st D.) from 1941 to 1944, sitting in the 163rd and 164th New York State Legislatures, being the only member of the American Labor Party in both legislatures, though elected with Republican endorsement.

He died on July 1, 1995.

== Sources ==
New York State Assembly
Preceded by Philip J. Casey	New York State Assembly; Rensselaer County, 1st District; 1941–1944	Succeeded by John S. Finch all of Rensselaer County
