= Emory Sherwood Adams =

United States Army general (1881–1967)

Emory S. Adams
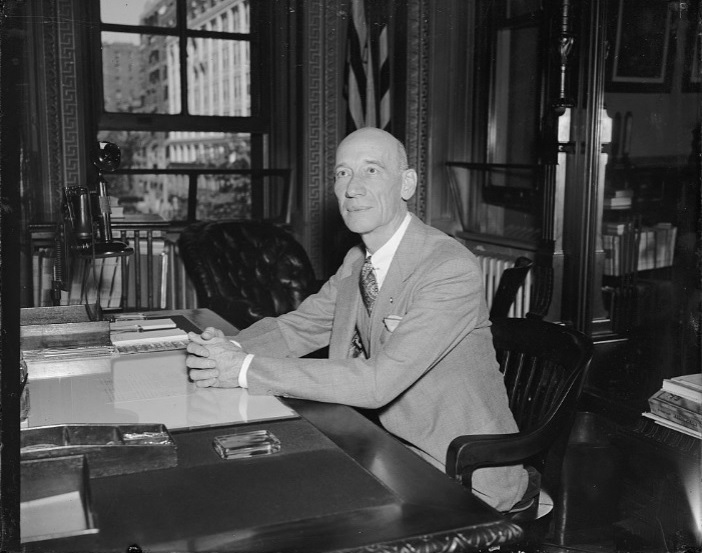
- Adams in 1938
- Born: February 6, 1881; Manhattan, Kansas, U.S.
- Died: November 30, 1967 (aged 86); Monterey, California, U.S.
- Burial place: San Francisco National Cemetery
- Children: 2
- Military career
- Allegiance: United States of America
- Branch: United States Army
- Service years: 1898–1945
- Rank: Major General
- Commands: Adjutant General of the U.S. Army
- Awards: Distinguished Service Medal

Emory Sherwood Adams (February 6, 1881 – November 30, 1967) was an American military officer who was Adjutant General of the United States Army from 1938 to 1942.

== Early life ==
Adams was born in Manhattan, Kansas, on February 6, 1881. He graduated from Kansas State Agricultural College in 1898.

== Military career ==
Adams served with the 20th Kansas Infantry and in the Regular Army from 1898 to 1902. He was commissioned as an infantry officer in October 1902. He saw overseas duty in the Philippines, China, and France. He had extended duty with the Adjutant General’s Department from 1922 to 1938. This service was followed by appointment as Adjutant General of the Army with the rank of major general in May 1938. Adams retired from service on February 28, 1942, but was recalled the next month. He continued to serve until August 1945. His decorations included the Distinguished Service Medal for service in Brest, France during World War I.

== Later life ==
Adams died on November 30, 1967.

== See also ==
- List of Adjutants General of the U.S. Army

Military offices
Preceded by Edgar T. Conley	Adjutant General of the U. S. Army; May 1, 1938 – February 28, 1942	Succeeded by James A. Ulio
