= 1968 New York state election =

- November 5, 1968

The 1968 New York state election was held on November 5, 1968, to elect a judge of the New York Court of Appeals and a U.S. senator, as well as all members of the New York State Assembly and the New York State Senate.

== Nominations ==
The Republican State Committee met on March 27 at Albany, New York and designated U.S. Senator Jacob K. Javits, and endorsed the Democratic/Liberal Judge Adrian P. Burke, for re-election.

The Democratic primary for U.S. Senator was won by Paul O'Dwyer, the brother of Mayor of New York William O'Dwyer (in office 1946–1950). Paul O'Dwyer gathered 25,000 signatures, and got on the primary ballot by petition on a peace platform and favoring Eugene McCarthy to be nominated for president. In a tight race, he defeated Nassau County Executive Eugene H. Nickerson, the candidate of the party bosses and supporter of Robert F. Kennedy for president, and Congressman Joseph Y. Resnick, the candidate who planned to back Lyndon B. Johnson for re-election. The vote was O'Dwyer 275,877; Nickerson 257,639; and Resnick 229,803.

The Liberal primary for U.S. Senator was won by the incumbent Republican Jacob K. Javits who defeated Murray Baron, a former Liberal New York County Chairman.

The Conservative State Committee met on April 2, and designated by acclamation James L. Buckley for the U.S. Senate, and endorsed the Democratic/Liberal Judge Adrian P. Burke for re-election.

The Peace and Freedom Party nominated Herman B. Ferguson, a former elementary-school assistant principal, for the U.S. Senate. Ferguson had been convicted of conspiring to murder moderate civil rights leaders Roy Wilkins and Whitney Young, and his candidature was contested. On October 2, a New York Supreme Court justice ruled that Ferguson was entitled to run.

== Result ==
The incumbents Burke and Javits were re-elected.

1968 state election result
Ticket / Office	Republican ticket		Democratic ticket		Conservative ticket		Liberal ticket		Peace and Freedom ticket		Socialist Labor ticket		Socialist Workers ticket	
Judge of the Court of Appeals	Adrian P. Burke	2,590,598	Adrian P. Burke	2,578,460	Adrian P. Burke	418,542	Adrian P. Burke	299,078	(none)		(none)		(none)	
U.S. Senator	Jacob K. Javits	2,810,836	Paul O'Dwyer	2,150,695	James L. Buckley	1,139,402	Jacob K. Javits	458,936	Herman B. Ferguson	8,775	John Emanuel	7,964	Hedda Garza	4,919

== See also ==
- New York state elections
- 1968 United States presidential election

== Sources ==
- Official result: Humphrey and Javits Won State Without Liberal Party's Votes in NYT on December 10, 1968 (subscription required)
