= 1927 New York state election =

- November 8, 1927

The 1927 New York state election was held on November 8, 1927, to elect a judge of the New York Court of Appeals, as well as all members of the New York State Assembly. Nine amendments to the New York Constitution were also proposed.

== History ==
In 1927, there was only one state officer to be elected statewide: a judge of the Court of Appeals, to succeed Benjamin N. Cardozo, who had been elected Chief Judge in 1926. John F. O'Brien was appointed in January 1927 to fill the vacancy temporarily.

The Democratic state convention met on September 29 at the Harmanus Bleecker Hall in Albany, New York. The incumbent John F. O'Brien was nominated to succeed himself.

The Republican state convention met on September 30 in Rochester, New York, and endorsed the Democratic nominee John F. O'Brien.

== Result ==
The jointly nominated incumbent O'Brien was re-elected.

1927 state election result
Office	Democratic ticket	Republican ticket	Socialist ticket
Judge of the Court of Appeals	John F. O'Brien	John F. O'Brien	Hezekiah D. Wilcox

== See also ==
- New York state elections
