= Adrian P. Burke =

American lawyer, judge and politician (1904–2000)

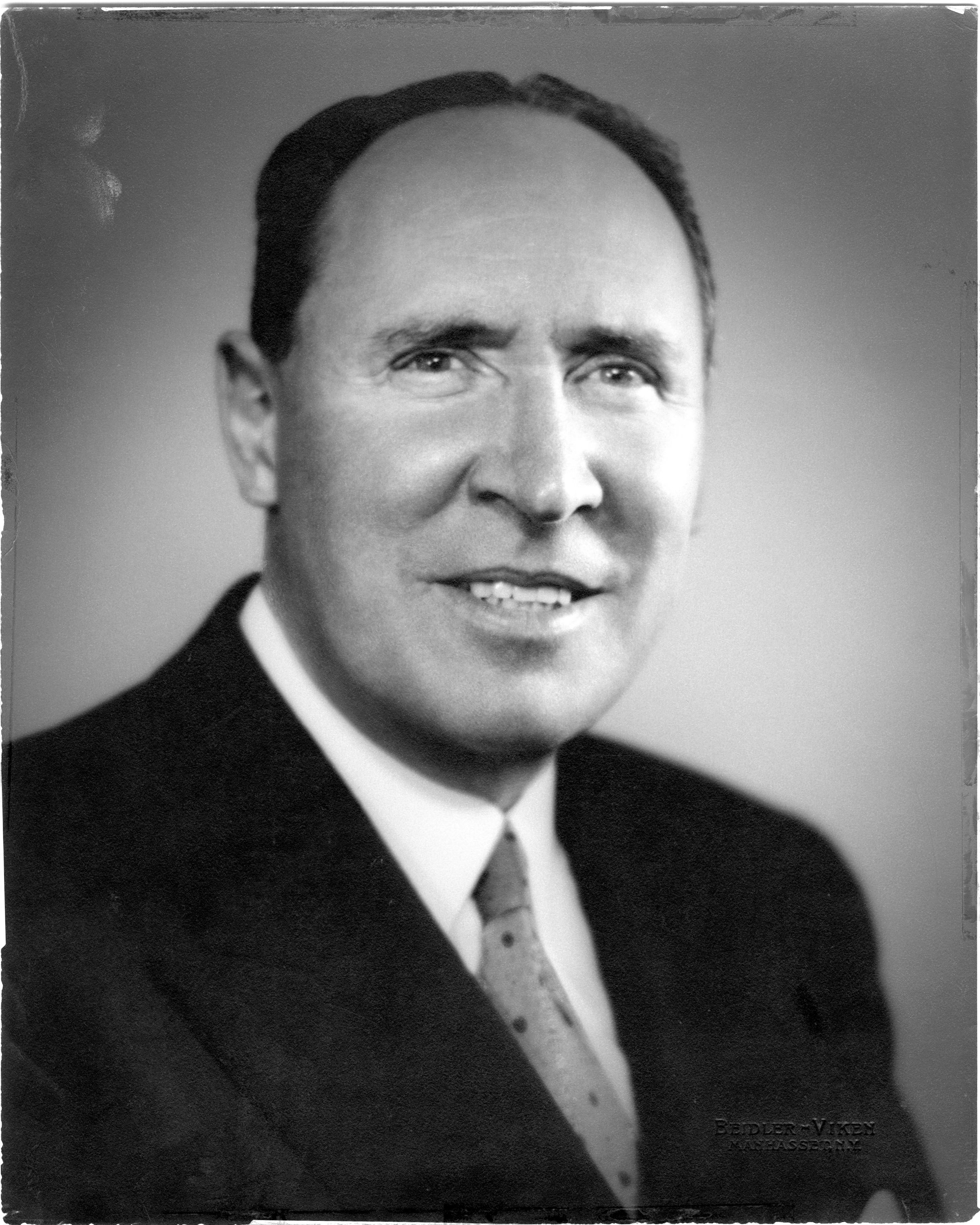
Honourable Adrian P. Burke

Adrian Paul Burke (October 2, 1904 in The Bronx, New York City – September 3, 2000 in Lauderhill, Broward County, Florida) was an American lawyer and politician.

== Life ==
He was the son of Thomas F. Burke and Rose Mary (Daw) Burke. His brother was the film actor James Burke.

He attended the Incarnation School and Regis High School of New York City (he graduated from Regis in 1923 and later taught there for several years while attending Fordham Law School at night).

He graduated from College of the Holy Cross in 1927, and from Fordham Law School in 1930. He was admitted to the bar in 1932, and commenced practice in New York City. In 1935, he married Edith Martin, and they had three children, Adrian Jr., Edith, and Frank.

He was Assistant Counsel of the Joint Legislative Committee Investigating Public Utilities in 1936, a delegate to the New York State Constitutional Convention of 1938. He was the founder, and from 1941 to 1953 President, of the Youth Counsel Bureau in the District Attorney's Offices.

In 1953, he managed the mayoral campaign of Robert F. Wagner, Jr., and was appointed by Mayor Wagner to be Corporation Counsel of New York City in 1954.

In 1954, he was elected on the Democratic and Liberal tickets to the New York Court of Appeals, and re-elected in 1968. He resigned from the bench at the end of 1973. In 1974, he was again appointed Corporation Counsel of New York City by Mayor Abraham D. Beame.

He died at his retirement home in Florida.

He wrote his memoirs, Everything I Needed: Living and Working in New York (Golden String Press, New York, 2004), which was edited by his son Frank Burke, professor emeritus at Queen's University.

His granddaughter, Tyler Clark Burke, has written several books, including The Last Loose Tooth (Random House).

== Sources ==
- The History of the New York Court of Appeals, 1932-2003 by Bernard S. Meyer, Burton C. Agata & Seth H. Agata (page 24)
- Court of Appeals judges
- A.P. Burke, 95, Appeals Court Judge, Dies in NYT on September 9, 2000
