= John F. O'Brien (judge) =

American lawyer and politician (1874–1939)

- Born: June 13, 1874; Watertown, U.S.
- Died: December 25, 1939 (aged 65)
- Education: Georgetown University; New York Law School
- Occupation: Judge

John Francis O'Brien (June 13, 1874 – December 25, 1939) was an American lawyer and politician.

== Life ==
He was born on June 13, 1874, in Watertown, Jefferson County, New York, the son of New York Attorney General Denis O'Brien. He graduated from Georgetown College (now part of Georgetown University) in 1896, and from New York Law School in 1898. He served as Assistant Corporation Council of New York City. After Benjamin N. Cardozo took office as Chief Judge of the New York Court of Appeals in January 1927, O'Brien was appointed a judge to fill the vacancy, and in November 1927 was elected to a fourteen-year term. Ill health compelled him to tender his resignation on December 7, effective December 31, 1939. He died on December 25, before the resignation could take effect, but already on December 22 Albert Conway was appointed by Governor Herbert Lehman to fill the vacancy temporarily, to take office on January 1, 1940.

== Sources ==
- Bio at Court History
- Election History of NYCoA at Court History
- Political Graveyard
