= John T. Loughran =

American judge (1889–1953)

John Thomas Loughran (February 23, 1889 – March 31, 1953) was an American lawyer and politician. He was Chief Judge of the New York Court of Appeals from 1945 until his death in 1953.

== Life ==
John Thomas Loughran was born in Kingston, New York on February 23, 1889. He graduated from the Fordham University School of Law in 1911.

He was a justice of the New York Supreme Court from 1931 to 1934.

On May 21, 1934, he was appointed to the New York Court of Appeals to fill the vacancy caused by the resignation of Henry T. Kellogg. In November 1934, he was elected on the Democratic and Republican tickets to a full 14-year term. In September 1945, after the death of Irving Lehman, Loughran was appointed Chief Judge of the Court of Appeals. In November 1946, he was re-elected unopposed to a 14-year term as Chief Judge, and died in office.

He died of a heart attack in Kingston on March 31, 1953, and was buried at the St. Mary's Cemetery in Kingston.

The John T. Loughran Bridge was named in his honor.

Legal offices
Preceded by Irving Lehman	Chief Judge of the New York Court of Appeals; 1945–1953	Succeeded by Edmund H. Lewis
