= Marvin R. Dye =

American judge (1895–1997)

Marvin Rood Dye (July 12, 1895 – October 25, 1997) was an American lawyer and judge. He served on the New York Supreme Court, the New York Court of Appeals, and the New York Court of Claims. He was noted as "a powerful advocate for freedom of speech, religion, and the press." During his 28-year tenure with the Court of Appeals, he ruled on several censorship cases, including keeping prayer out of New York schools and allowing the Tropic of Cancer by Henry James to be published.

== Early life ==
Dye was born on a vineyard in Forestville in Chautauqua County, New York on July 12, 1895. His parents were Virginia "Jenni" (née Marvin) and Daniel A. Dye, a teacher, farmer, and co-owner of a furniture business. His mother was also a teacher. As a youth, he rode a horse to attend the Forestville Free Academy. He also worked in the vineyard. After graduating from the academy, he spent an additional year at Forestville High School with the encouragement of a teacher.

He graduated LL.B. from Cornell Law School in 1917. He also completed a postgraduate degree in 1965 from the New York Law School.

During World War I, he enlisted and was commissioned as the First Lieutenant in the 49th Infantry Regiment.

== Career ==
Dye began practicing law at Rochester, New York after passing the New York State Bar in May 1920. He formed a practice Whitbeck & Dye with Ernest Whitbeck. He was the County Attorney of Monroe County, New York from 1934 to 1935. After that appointment ended, he returned to private practice.

In November 1940, Dye was appointed by Governor Herbert H. Lehman to the New York Court of Claims. He served in this position from 1940 to 1945.

In November 1944, Dye was elected to serve as an associate judge on the New York Court of Appeals. He was re-elected in 1958 for a fourteen-year term, running unopposed with a cross-party endorsement. He was endorsed by the New York County Lawyers; Association and the Bar Association of the City of New York.

He was noted as "a powerful advocate for freedom of speech, religion, and the press." whose opinions were mostly based on precedent. During his tenure, he ruled on several censorship cases, including keeping prayer out of New York schools (Matter of Engel v. Vitale, 1961) and allowing the Tropic of Cancer by Henry James to be published (People of New York v. Frich, 1963). He also ruled that the novel Fanny Hill by John Cleland could be distributed and that a film based on Lady Chatterley’s Lover by D. H. Lawrence could be produced (Matter of Kingsley Intl. Pictures Corp. v. Regents of the Univ. of the State of New York, 1959).

He retired from the Court of Appeals at the end of 1965 when he reached the constitutional age limit of 70 years. He then served on the New York Supreme Court (7th District) for two years.

He was a member of the American Bar Association and Delta Theta Phi, a professional law fraternity He was also the vice president of the Monroe County Bar Association.

== Honors ==
Dye received an honorary LL.D. from Syracuse University in 1964. He received the Distinguished Alumnus Award from Cornell Law School for 1978–1979.

== Personal life ==
Before leaving for World War I, Dye married Miriam Kelley on June 25, 1918. She was from Warsaw, New York and was the sister of his English teacher at the Forestville Free Academy. Miriam gave birth to their first child while he was still fighting in Europe. Their children were Stanley Dye, Emily Dye Cassebeer, and Julianne Dye Christie.

The couple moved to Rochester, New York in April 1920. They built a house on Cobbs Hill Drive but had to sell it during the Great Depression. Later, they lived in Greece, New York.

He was a Presbyterian and a member of the American Legion, the Freemasons, and the Cornell Club of Rochester.

Dye died in at the Valley Manor Nursing Home Rochester on October 25, 1997 at the age of 102. He was buried in Riverside Cemetery in Rochester.
