= William N. Haskell =

William Haskell
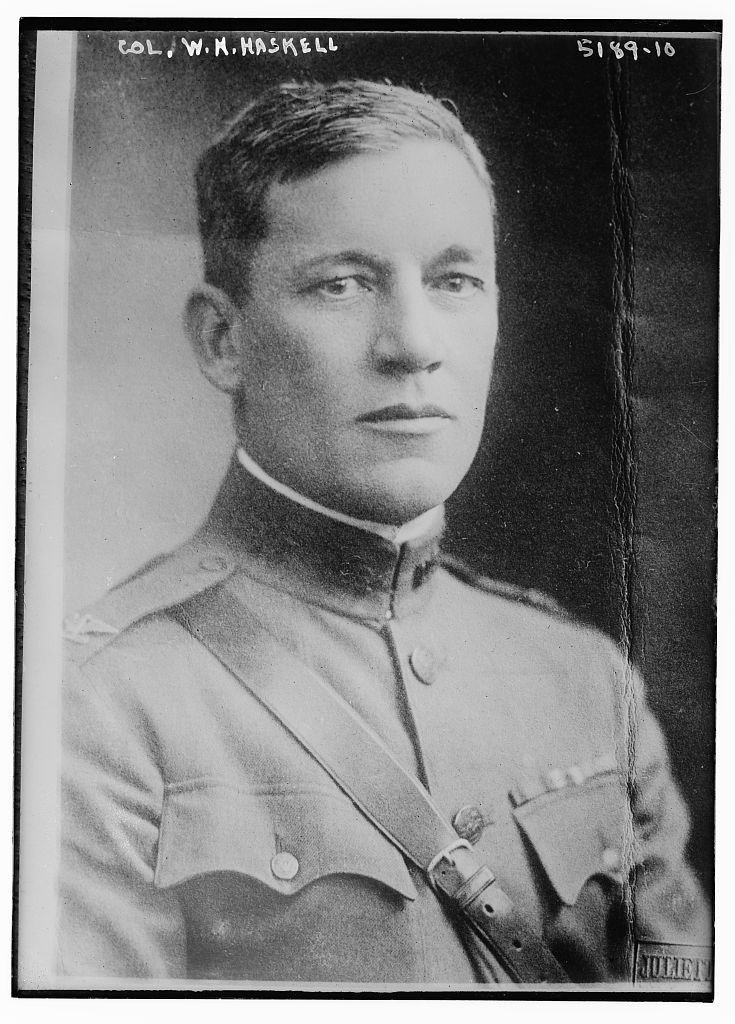

Director of the Office of Civilian Defense
- In office March 10, 1944 – June 4, 1945
- President: Franklin D. Roosevelt; Harry S. Truman
- Preceded by: John Martin (acting)
- Succeeded by: Millard Caldwell (Federal Civil Defense Administration)

Personal details
- Born: William Nafew Haskell Jr. August 13, 1878 Albany, New York, U.S.
- Died: August 13, 1952 (aged 74) Greenwich, Connecticut, U.S.
- Party: Democratic
- Education: United States Military Academy (BS)

William Nafew Haskell Jr. (13 August 1878, in Albany, New York – 13 August 1952, in Greenwich, Connecticut) was a U.S. military officer. He was a 1901 graduate of the United States Military Academy.

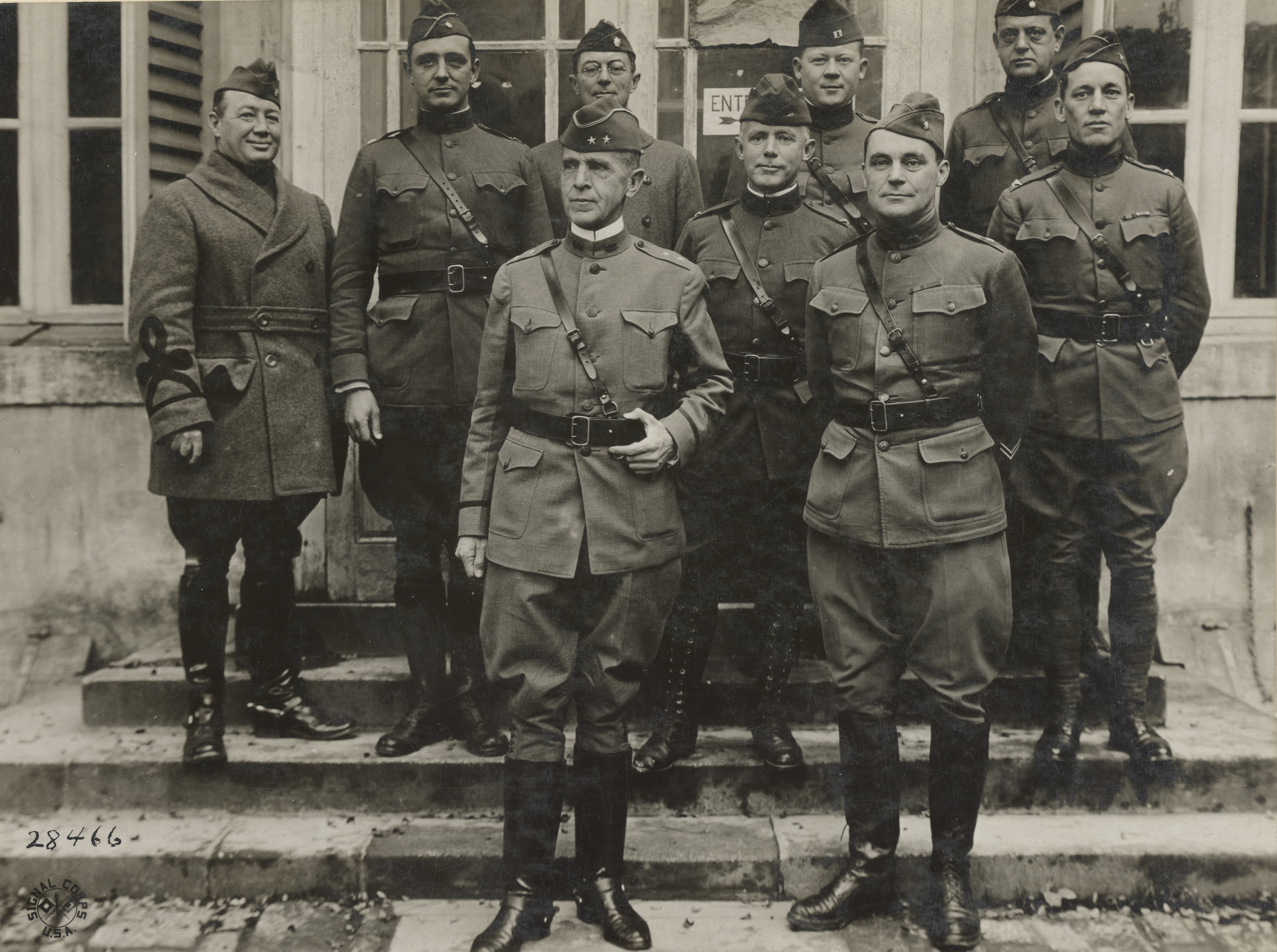
Major General Robert Lee Bullard, the newly appointed commander of the U.S. Second Army, pictured here with members of his staff at Second Army's headquarters at Toul, Meurthe-et-Moselle, France, October 20, 1918. Stood on the far right in the second row is Colonel William H. Haskell, his assistant chief of staff.

After graduating 66th in a class of 74 from West Point, Haskell initially served in the cavalry. He graduated from the Army Staff College in 1905 and then served from 1906 to 1907 in the Philippine–American War fighting against the Moro tribesmen. From November 1907 to November 1911, Haskell served in the Signal Corps. Promoted to captain effective 1 July 1916, he was assigned as temporary colonel of the 69th Infantry Regiment of the New York National Guard from 5 August 1916 to 9 March 1917 on the Mexican border. Haskell then served in the field artillery with the American Expeditionary Forces (AEF) during World War I, rising again to temporary colonel by 23 December 1918 and earning the Army Distinguished Service Medal.

Reverting to captain in April 1920, Haskell was quickly promoted to major in July and lieutenant colonel in September. He was assigned to the American Relief Administration in 1919, first as chief of the ARA Armenia Mission, and later served as chief director of the ARA mission in Soviet Russia during the Russian famine of 1921-1922. He retired from the army on 27 January 1926.

On 19 May 1926, Haskell was appointed major general and commander of the New York National Guard by New York Governor Alfred E. Smith. He received federal recognition as a major general on 28 May 1934. Haskell served as commander of the New York National Guard for fourteen years until October 1940, when he was appointed commanding general of the 27th Infantry Division in preparation for American entry into World War II. He relinquished command of the division in October 1941 and retired from military service in April 1942. In appreciation for his service, the state of New York promoted him to lieutenant general.

Running as a Democrat, Haskell was an unsuccessful candidate for Lieutenant Governor of New York, losing to Republican Joe R. Hanley in November 1943. He became Director of Civilian Protection for the state of New York and then served as head of the national Office of Civilian Defense from 1944 to 1945.

After the war, Haskell became vice president of the Save the Children Federation. From late 1945 until 1947, he served as executive director of the Cooperative for American Remittances to Europe (CARE).

Haskell retired to Greenwich, Connecticut, where he died at Greenwich Hospital in 1952. He was buried at the West Point Cemetery on 16 August 1952. His wife Winifred Agnes (Farrell) Haskell was interred beside him on 6 August 1964.

Party political offices
Preceded by Charles Poletti	Democratic nominee for Lieutenant Governor of New York; 1943	Succeeded by Erastus Corning
Political offices
Preceded by John Martin; Acting	Director of the Office of Civilian Defense; 1944–1945	Vacant Title next held by Millard Caldwell; 1950 as Administrator of the Federal Civil Defense Administration
