= Irving Lehman =

American judge

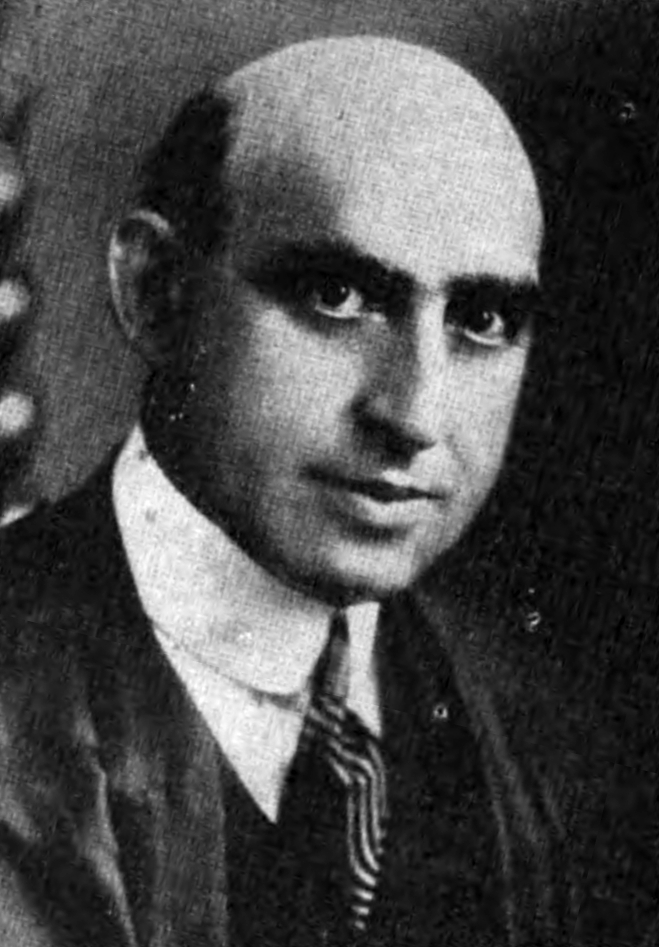
- Lehman c. 1927

Chief Judge of the New York Court of Appeals
- In office January 1, 1940 – September 22, 1945
- Preceded by: Frederick E. Crane
- Succeeded by: John T. Loughran

Judge of the New York Court of Appeals
- In office January 1, 1924 – December 31, 1939

Justice of the New York Supreme Court
- In office January 1, 1909 – December 31, 1923

Personal details
- Born: January 28, 1876 New York City, U.S.
- Died: September 22, 1945 (aged 69) Port Chester, New York, U.S.
- Spouse: Sara "Sissie" Straus (m. 1901)
- Parent(s): Mayer Lehman; Babetta Newgass Lehman
- Relatives: Lehman family Straus family
- Education: Columbia University (BA, LLB)

Irving Lehman (January 28, 1876 – September 22, 1945) was an American lawyer and politician from New York. He was Chief Judge of the New York Court of Appeals from 1940 until his death in 1945.

== Biography ==
He was born on January 28, 1876, in New York City to Mayer Lehman (d. 1897) and Babette Newgass and raised Jewish. Future New York State governor and United States Senator Herbert H. Lehman was his brother. He graduated with an A.B. from Columbia College in 1896 and an LL.B. from Columbia University Law School in 1898.

He was a justice of the New York Supreme Court from 1909 to 1923, elected in 1908 on the Democratic ticket, and re-elected in 1922 on the Democratic and Republican tickets.

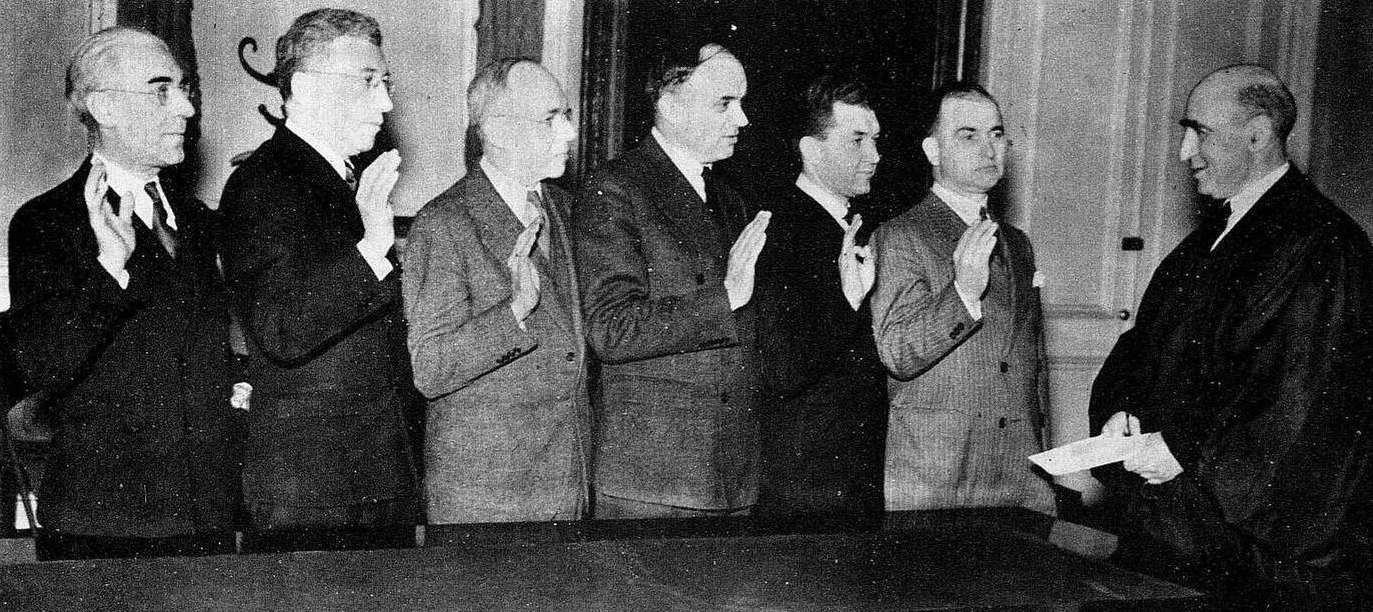
Judge Lehman (far right) swears in New York City's first American Labor Party councilmen, 1937. (L-R): Salvatore Ninfo, Baruch Charney Vladeck, Andrew R. Armstrong, Louis Hollander, Charles Belous, Mike Quill, Irving Lehman.

In 1923, he was elected on the Democratic and Republican tickets to a 14-year term on the New York Court of Appeals, and re-elected in 1937. In 1939, he was elected Chief Judge of the Court of Appeals on the Democratic, Republican and American Labor tickets, and remained on the bench until his death in office.

=== People v. Buchalter ===
In 1942 the New York Court of Appeals affirmed the convictions of the notorious Louis Buchalter and his two associates Emanuel Weiss and Louis Capone under a sharply divided decision of the judges, who filed four opinions. The death sentences were upheld by a vote of 4–3. (People v. Buchalter, 289 N.Y. 181) However, Judge Lehman, who was also affirming the conviction of the three, expressed some doubts in the verdict and stated that the errors and defects in the case were in fact numerous. In 1943 the United States Supreme Court granted Buchalter's petition to review the case and in a full opinion affirmed the conviction, 7–0, with two justices abstaining. (319 U.S. 427 (1943)) Finally, Judge Lehman signed a show cause order in 1944 because the counsel for the trio had appeared before Governor Thomas E. Dewey in a clemency plea, and Lehman eventually delayed the execution of the condemned men. Even so, the clemency plea was denied by Governor Dewey. On March 4, 1944, Emanuel Weiss thanked Chief Judge Lehman in his final words before being electrocuted in Sing Sing.

== Personal life ==
On June 26, 1901, he married Sissie Straus, the daughter of Nathan Straus, American merchant and philanthropist who co-owned two of New York City's biggest department stores, R.H. Macy & Company and Abraham & Straus. The couple was childless.

Lehman died of a heart ailment on September 22, 1945, at his home on Ridge Street in Port Chester, New York. Services were held at Temple Emanu El in Manhattan. He was buried at the Cypress Hills Cemetery.

Legal offices
Preceded by Frederick E. Crane	Chief Judge of the New York Court of Appeals; 1940–1945	Succeeded by John T. Loughran
