= 1937 New York state election =

- November 2, 1937

The 1937 New York state election was held on November 2, 1937, to elect a judge of the New York Court of Appeals, as well as all members of the New York State Assembly. Besides, delegates for the New York State Constitutional Convention, to be held in 1938, were elected, and an amendment to the State Constitution which proposed the increase of the term in office of the members of the New York State Assembly to two years, and of the statewide elected state officers (Governor, Lieutenant Governor, Comptroller, Attorney General) to four years, was accepted.

== History ==
In 1937, there was only one state officer to be elected statewide for a standing office: a judge of the Court of Appeals, to succeed Irving Lehman, whose term would expire at the end of the year. Besides, 15 delegates-at-large for the constitutional convention were elected statewide, the remaining delegates were elected in the assembly districts.

The Socialist met on September 19 and nominated Miss Marion L. Severn for the Court of Appeals.

The Republican State Committee met on September 23. They endorsed the Democratic incumbent Irving Lehman.

The Democratic State Committee met on September 24 at Albany, New York, U.S. Postmaster General James A. Farley presided. The incumbent Irving Lehman was nominated to succeed himself.

The American Labor State Committee met on September 25 and endorsed the Democratic incumbent Irving Lehman for re-election. Besides, delegates-at-large for the constitutional convention were nominated, including the endorsement of seven Democrats but no Republicans.

== Result ==
The jointly nominated incumbent Irving was re-elected.

This was the last general election of assemblymen in an odd-numbered year.

1937 state election result
Office	Republican ticket		Democratic ticket		American Labor ticket		City Fusion ticket		Socialist ticket	
Judge of the Court of Appeals	Irving Lehman	2,435,478	Irving Lehman	998,158	Irving Lehman	432,149	Irving Lehman	135,114	Marion L. Severn	40,132

== See also ==
- New York state elections

== Sources ==
- Result (for delegates-at-large) : MOFFAT IS LEADER IN CONVENTION VOTE in NYT on December 16, 1937 (subscription required)
- Result in the New York Red Book (1938)
