= Edmund H. Lewis =

American judge (1884—1972)

Edmund Harris Lewis (August 30, 1884 – July 31, 1972) was an American lawyer and politician from New York who served as a justice of the New York Supreme Court and the Chief Judge of the New York Court of Appeals from 1953 to 1954.

== Life ==
He was the son of Ceylon H. Lewis.

He served as a justice of the New York Supreme Court from 1930 to 1940, also sitting on the Appellate Division, Fourth Department beginning in 1933.

In 1940, he was appointed a judge of the Chief Judge of the New York Court of Appeals to fill the vacancy caused by the resignation of Irving G. Hubbs. He was elected to a full 14-year term in the November 1940. On April 22, 1953, following the death of John T. Loughran, he was appointed Chief Judge of the Court of Appeals. In the November 1953, he was elected on the Republican, Democratic, and Liberal tickets. He remained on the bench until the end of 1954, when he reached the constitutional age limit of 70 years.

== Sources ==
- Political Graveyard
- Obit in NYT on August 1, 1972 (subscription required)
- Listing of Court of Appeals judges, with portrait

Legal offices
Preceded by John T. Loughran	Chief Judge of the New York Court of Appeals; 1953–1954	Succeeded by Albert Conway
