= Custer County Schools =

Location
- 709 Main Street; Westcliffe, Colorado 81252; United States; 38°8′10″N 105°27′45″W

Information
- School type: Public school
- School district: Custer County C-1
- NCES District ID: 0807200
- Superintendent: Sydney Benesch
- CEEB code: 061435
- NCES School ID: 080720001226; 080720001732; 080720001225
- PK–8 Principal: Laurie Yarger
- 9–12 Principal: Joy Parrish
- Teaching staff: 32.51 (on an FTE basis)
- Grades: P–12
- Gender: Coeducational
- Enrollment: 345 (2023–24)
- Student to teacher ratio: 10.61
- Campus type: Rural, Remote
- Colors: Yellow and blue
- Athletics conference: West Central
- Mascot: Bobcat
- Website: www.custercountyschools.org

Custer County Schools is a public K–12 school located in Westcliffe, Colorado. It is the only school in Custer County School District C-1, which serves most of Custer County, including Westcliffe and Silver Cliff.

During the 2023–24 school year, there were 345 students enrolled in the school, including 152 in the elementary school, 78 in the middle school, and 115 in the high school. The school operates four days per week, Monday through Thursday, from 8:00 am to 4:00 pm. The three programs hold classes in the same building.
