= Charles S. Desmond =

American judge (1896–1987)

Chief Judge of the New York Court of Appeals
- In office 1959–1966

Associate Judge of the New York Court of Appeals
- In office 1940–1959

Justice of the New York Supreme Court
- In office 1940
- Appointed by: Herbert H. Lehman

Personal details
- Born: December 2, 1896 Buffalo, New York
- Died: February 9, 1987 (aged 90) Buffalo, New York
- Children: 4
- Education: Canisius College (BA, MA); University at Buffalo Law School (LLB)

Military service
- Branch/service: United States Marine Corps
- Rank: Second Lieutenant
- Battles/wars: World War I

Charles Stewart Desmond (December 2, 1896 – February 9, 1987), was an American lawyer and politician from New York. He was Chief Judge of the New York Court of Appeals from 1960 to 1966.

== Life ==
Desmond was born and died in Buffalo, New York. He was the son of Patrick Desmond and Katherine (Jordan) Desmond. He graduated A.B. and M.A. from Canisius College.

During World War I, he served as a second lieutenant in the United States Marine Corps Aviation. However, he caught influenza during training and did not get overseas before the Armistice.

In 1920, he graduated LL.B. from University at Buffalo Law School.

He married Helen Ryan (d. 1958) and they had four children: Charles Ryan, Sheila (Landon), Kathleen (Hughes) and Patricia (Williams).

In January 1940, he was appointed by Governor Herbert H. Lehman a justice of the New York Supreme Court to fill a vacancy.

In November 1940, he was elected on the Democratic and American Labor tickets a judge of the New York Court of Appeals, and re-elected in 1954 on the Democratic, Republican and Liberal tickets. In 1959, he was elected unopposed Chief Judge. He retired from the bench at the end of 1966 when he reached the constitutional age limit of 70 years.

Afterwards he lived at his farm in Eden, New York, resumed his private practice and taught at the University at Buffalo Law School. He died at the Mercy Hospital in Buffalo.

His only son, Charles Ryan Desmond (known to family as "Ryan"), followed in his father's footsteps by graduating from the University at Buffalo School of Law in 1953. Ryan became an accomplished trial attorney in Buffalo and served as a Justice of the Peace in the town of Eden, New York, winning election as a Democrat in a heavily Republican district. He tragically predeceased his father, dying in an automobile accident during a blizzard in January 1985. His legal legacy in Western New York was carried on by his own son, attorney Charles S. Desmond II.

== See also ==
Legal offices
Preceded by Albert Conway	Chief Judge of the New York Court of Appeals; 1960–1966	Succeeded by Stanley H. Fuld
