= Albert Conway =

American judge (1889–1969

Personal details
- Born: April 3, 1889
- Died: May 18, 1969 (aged 80)
- Education: Fordham University School of Law

Albert Conway (April 3, 1889 – May 18, 1969) was an American lawyer and politician from New York. He was Chief Judge of the New York Court of Appeals from 1955 to 1959.

== Life ==
He was the son of Joseph P. Conway and Jane Lucille (Flanagan) Conway. He graduated from Fordham University Law School in 1911. In 1917, he married Irene Hewitt (d. 1929). Afterwards he married Alice O'Neil (d. 1978).

He was an alternate delegate to the 1928 Democratic National Convention. In 1928, he ran for New York State Attorney General but was defeated by Republican Hamilton Ward, Jr. Early in 1929, Governor Franklin D. Roosevelt appointed Conway as New York State Superintendent of Insurance.

In June 1930, he was appointed County Judge of Kings County to fill the vacancy caused by the resignation of W. Bernard Vause. He was a justice of the New York Supreme Court from 1931 to 1939, on the Appellate Division from 1937 on. In 1939, he conducted an extraordinary term of the Supreme Court at Buffalo, New York, presiding over a special grand jury investigation of Buffalo city affairs.

In December 1939, he was appointed a judge of the New York Court of Appeals to fill the vacancy caused by the resignation of John F. O'Brien. In November 1940, he was elected on the Democratic and American Labor tickets to a full 14-year term. He was elected on the Democratic, Republican and Liberal tickets Chief Judge in 1954, and retired from the bench at the end of 1959 when he reached the constitutional age limit of 70 years.

He died at the Methodist Hospital in Brooklyn.

== Sources ==
- Political Graveyard
- Appointed county judge, in NYT on June 20, 1930 (subscription required)
- Obit in NYT on May 19, 1969 (subscription required)
- Listing of Court of Appeals judges, with portrait

Party political offices
Preceded by Benjamin Stolz	Democratic nominee for Attorney General of New York; 1928	Succeeded by John J. Bennett Jr.
Legal offices
Preceded by Edmund H. Lewis	Chief Judge of the New York Court of Appeals; 1955–1959	Succeeded by Charles S. Desmond
