= M. William Bray =

American politician (Michael William Bray; 1889–1961)

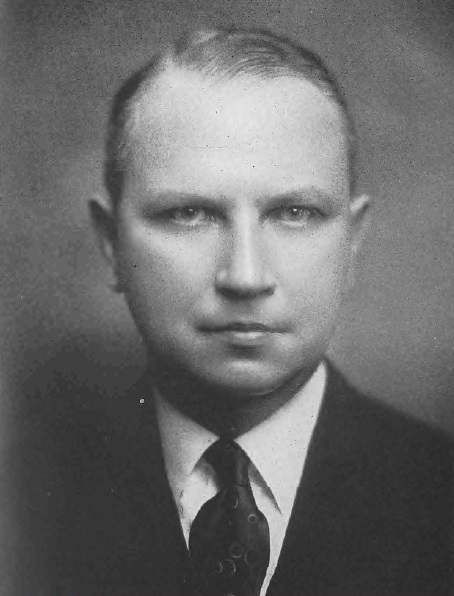
- From the 1935 edition of the New York Red Book

Lieutenant Governor of New York
- In office 1933–1938
- Preceded by: Herbert H. Lehman
- Succeeded by: Charles Poletti

Member of the New York State Building Code Commission
- In office 1955–1959
- Preceded by: Ralph A. Lehr
- Succeeded by: None (commission abolished)

President of the New York State Bar Association
- In office 1950–1951
- Preceded by: Otis T. Bradley
- Succeeded by: Arthur V. D. Chamberlain

Member of the New York Public Service Commission
- In office 1942–1945
- Preceded by: George R. Lunn
- Succeeded by: Howard B. Donaldson

Chairman of the New York State Democratic Committee
- In office 1928–1930
- Preceded by: Edwin Corning
- Succeeded by: James A. Farley

Personal details
- Born: Michael William Bray; October 25, 1889 Churubusco, New York, US
- Died: January 17, 1961 (aged 71) Utica, New York, US
- Resting place: Saint Patrick Cemetery, Chateaugay, New York
- Spouse: Catherine Claire Coleman (m. 1948)
- Education: Union College; Albany Law School
- Occupation: Attorney

Michael William Bray (September 25, 1889 – January 17, 1961) was an American lawyer and politician. He was the lieutenant governor of New York from 1933 to 1938.

== Biography ==
Bray was born in Churubusco, New York on September 25, 1889, the son of John Bray and Hannah (Fahey) Bray. He graduated from Union College in 1911, and from Albany Law School in 1913. He commenced practice in Utica, New York.

In 1924, he became Chairman of the Oneida County Democratic Committee, and he was Chairman of the New York State Democratic Committee from 1928 to 1930. He was a delegate to the 1928, 1932, 1940 and 1948 Democratic National Conventions.

In 1932 Governor Franklin D. Roosevelt, former Governor Al Smith and state Democratic Party chairman James A. Farley backed the nomination of Herbert H. Lehman for governor, over the opposition of Tammany Hall and its allies. Lehman won, and as a peace offering Farley permitted Tammany to choose the candidate for lieutenant governor. Bray was nominated, and won the general election, defeating Republican F. Trubee Davison. (Prior to 1954 the governor and lieutenant governor of New York were elected separately. Each party's candidates for governor and lieutenant governor now run separately in the primary election, and on a single ballot in the general election.)

Lehman and Bray were renominated and reelected in 1934 as he defeated Fred J. Douglas. They won again in 1936, and Bray defeated Ralph K. Robertson. In 1938 Bray was replaced as the lieutenant governor nominee by Charles Poletti, who had been Lehman's counsel and a Justice of the New York Supreme Court. Before Governor Lehman left office in 1942, he appointed Bray to the New York Public Service Commission, and he served until 1945.

In January 1948 Bray was confined to his bed by a heart condition when he was severely injured in a house fire. His death appeared imminent, and a priest administered the last rites. Bray suffered severe burns to his face, arms, and torso, and his right forearm was amputated, but he recovered and left the hospital in March. In November 1948 Bray wed Catherine Claire Coleman of New York City, who survived him.

Bray later served as bankruptcy trustee for the company that operated public buses in Schenectady, and he was President of the New York State Bar Association in 1950. In 1955, Bray was appointed to a 10-year term on the State Building Commission.

He died at St. Elizabeth's Hospital in Utica, New York on January 17, 1961. He was buried at Saint Patrick Cemetery in Chateaugay, New York.

== 1932 New York State Democratic Ticket ==
- Governor: Herbert H. Lehman
- Lieutenant Governor: M. William Bray
- Comptroller: Morris S. Tremaine
- Attorney General: John J. Bennett Jr.
- U.S. Senate: Robert F. Wagner

== 1934 New York State Democratic Ticket ==
- Governor: Herbert H. Lehman
- Lieutenant Governor: M. William Bray
- Comptroller: Morris S. Tremaine
- Attorney General: John J. Bennett Jr.
- U.S. Senate: Royal S. Copeland

== 1936 New York State Democratic Ticket ==
- Governor: Herbert H. Lehman
- Lieutenant Governor: M. William Bray
- Comptroller: Morris S. Tremaine
- Attorney General: John J. Bennett Jr.

Party political offices
Preceded by Edwin Corning	New York State Democratic Committee Chairman; August 1928 – 1930	Succeeded by James A. Farley
Preceded by Herbert H. Lehman	Democratic nominee for Lieutenant Governor of New York; 1932, 1934, 1936	Succeeded by Charles Poletti
Political offices
Preceded by Herbert H. Lehman	Lieutenant Governor of New York; 1933–1938	Succeeded by Charles Poletti
