= William F. Bleakley =

American judge & politician (1883–1969)

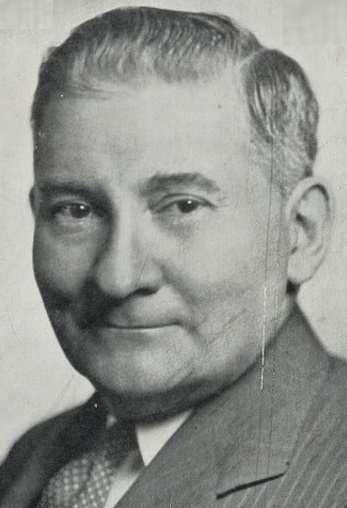
- Bleakley in 1936

1st County Executive of Westchester County
- In office January 2, 1939 – August 4, 1941
- Preceded by: None (position created)
- Succeeded by: Herbert Clinton Gerlach

Justice of the New York Supreme Court's 9th District
- In office January 3, 1928 – October 5, 1936
- Preceded by: William Popham Platt
- Succeeded by: Sydney A. Syme

Judge of the Court of Westchester County, New York
- In office December 1, 1921 – January 2, 1928
- Preceded by: Frank L. Young
- Succeeded by: Walter G. C. Otto

Judge of the City Court of Yonkers, New York
- In office January 1, 1918 – November 30, 1921
- Preceded by: William A. Walsh
- Succeeded by: Charles W. Boote

Personal details
- Born: November 11, 1883 Verplanck, New York, U.S.
- Died: October 2, 1969 (aged 85) Yonkers, New York, U.S.
- Resting place: Gate of Heaven Cemetery, Hawthorne, New York
- Party: Republican
- Spouse: Anna S. Martin (m. 1911)
- Children: 3
- Education: Cornell Law School
- Occupation: Attorney

William F. Bleakley (November 11, 1883 – October 2, 1969) was an American attorney, politician, and judge from Yonkers, New York. He is best known for being the first Westchester County Executive, and for being the unsuccessful Republican nominee for governor in 1936. Born in Verplanck, New York, Bleakley graduated from Cornell Law School and became an attorney in Yonkers. He served terms as a judge of the Yonkers city court and Westchester County court. From 1928 to 1936, he was a justice of the New York Supreme Court.

Bleakley was the unsuccessful Republican nominee for Governor of New York in 1936. When Westchester County adopted an executive/legislature form of government in 1938, Bleakley was the successful Republican nominee to serve as the first county executive, and he held the post from 1939 to 1941. Bleakley died in Yonkers on October 2, 1969, and was buried at Gate of Heaven Cemetery in Hawthorne, New York.

== Early life ==
Bleakley was born in Verplanck, New York, on November 11, 1883. He graduated from Peekskill's Drum Hill High School in 1899, and in 1904 he received his LL.B. degree from Cornell Law School. Bleakley was admitted to the bar in 1905, and practiced in Yonkers. From 1914 to 1917 he served on the school board in Yonkers.

== Career ==
=== Judicial ===
He was judge of the Yonkers city court from 1918 to 1921. In 1921 he was appointed to fill a vacancy on the Westchester County Court, where he served until winning election to the New York Supreme Court in 1928. He served on the state supreme court until 1936, when he resigned after having won the Republican nomination for governor.

=== 1936 gubernatorial election ===
In the 1936 general election, Bleakley was defeated by incumbent Herbert H. Lehman, 2,708,403 votes to 2,450,104. Afterwards, Bleakley resumed practicing law in Yonkers, and was a delegate to the state constitutional convention of 1937-38. He remained active in Republican politics, and was a delegate to the party's national conventions of 1940, 1944, and 1948, and an alternate delegate in 1952.

=== County executive ===
In 1938 Westchester County implemented a county executive/county legislature form of government. Bleakley was the successful Republican nominee for county executive, and served from 1939 to 1941.

=== Later career ===
Bleakley served as chairman of the state Commission for Investigation of Workmen's Compensation Law Administration from 1942 to 1944, appointed by Governor Thomas E. Dewey. In its final report the commission recommended several legislative and regulatory reforms designed to ensure that workers' compensation was administered efficiently and effectively. In addition, he served in the 1940s as counsel for the state's Joint Legislative Committee on Reapportionment.

== Personal life ==
=== Association with horse racing ===
Bleakley was involved in horse racing as: attorney for the Empire State Racing Association; attorney for the New York Racing Association; chairman of the board of Algam, the company which owned and operated Yonkers Raceway; and counsel and board of directors member for the Yonkers Trotting Association.

=== Civic and charitable activism ===
Bleakley was involved in civic and charitable causes, including: in 1946 Bleakley was chairman of the Yonkers Tercentennial Commission, which organized the 300th anniversary of the city's founding; member of the board of trustees of the Catholic Charities of the New York Archdiocese; president of the Cornell Law School Alumni Association; chairman of the Westchester Committee for the United Defense Fund (a post-World War II effort to aid returning veterans); and vice president of the New York State Bar Association.

== Death and burial ==
Bleakley died in Yonkers on October 2, 1969. He was interred at Gate of Heaven Cemetery in Hawthorne, New York.

Party political offices
Preceded by Robert Moses	New York Republican gubernatorial nominee 1936	Succeeded by Thomas E. Dewey
Political offices
Preceded by New Position	Westchester County Executive; 1939–1941	Succeeded by Herbert Clinton Gerlach
