= Charles Poletti =

American politician (1903–2002)

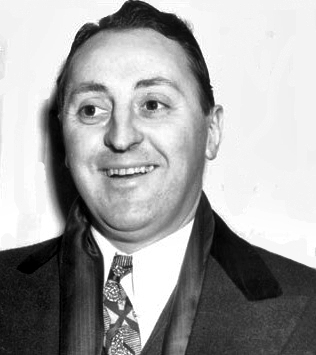
- United States War Department photo of Poletti as governor in 1942

46th Governor of New York
- In office December 3, 1942 – December 31, 1942
- Lieutenant: Joe R. Hanley (acting)
- Preceded by: Herbert H. Lehman
- Succeeded by: Thomas E. Dewey

Lieutenant Governor of New York
- In office January 1, 1939 – December 3, 1942
- Governor: Herbert H. Lehman
- Preceded by: M. William Bray
- Succeeded by: Joe R. Hanley (acting)

Justice of the New York Supreme Court
- In office 1937–1938
- Preceded by: John V. McAvoy
- Succeeded by: Felix C. Benevenga

Personal details
- Born: July 2, 1903 Barre, Vermont, US
- Died: August 8, 2002 (aged 99) Marco Island, Florida, US
- Party: Democratic
- Spouses: Jean Knox Ellis Poletti; Elizabeth Munn Vanderloo
- Education: Harvard University (AB, LLB)
- Profession: Attorney
- Civilian awards: Order of the Star of Jordan; Order of Saint Agatha (Grand Officer) (San Marino)

Military service
- Allegiance: United States of America
- Branch/service: United States Army
- Years of service: 1943–1945
- Rank: Colonel
- Unit: Allied Military Government for Occupied Territories
- Commands: Military Governor of Sicily; Military Governor of Naples; Military Governor of Rome; Military Governor of Milan; Military Governor of Lombardy
- Battles/wars: World War II: Italian Campaign
- Military awards: Legion of Merit; Order of Saint Gregory the Great; Grand Cross of the Crown of Italy; Order of the British Empire (Officer)

Charles Poletti (July 2, 1903 – August 8, 2002) was an American lawyer and politician. He became the 46th governor of New York in December 1942, and was the first person entirely of Italian-American ancestry to become the governor of a U.S. state.

Born in Barre, Vermont to Italian immigrants, Poletti graduated from Barre's Spaulding High School, Harvard University, and Harvard Law School, and became an attorney in New York City. He became active in the Democratic Party, and served as counsel to the Democratic National Committee, counsel to Governor Herbert H. Lehman, and a justice of the New York State Supreme Court.

Poletti served as lieutenant governor of New York from 1939 to 1942. He lost his bid for reelection in 1942, as did gubernatorial nominee John J. Bennett Jr. In December, Lehman resigned as governor in order to accept an appointment with the United States Department of State; Poletti succeeded to the governorship and served the final month of Lehman's term. After leaving office, Poletti served in World War II, initially as a special assistant to the Secretary of War, and then in the United States Army as a Civil Affairs officer responsible for rebuilding and restoring democracy in Italy following its liberation by the Allies.

After the war, Poletti practiced law, served as a member of the New York State Power Authority, and was an executive responsible for planning and overseeing execution of foreign exhibits at the 1964 New York World's Fair. After retiring, he resided in Florida and Elizabethtown, New York. He died in Florida at age 99, and was buried in Elizabethtown. At the time of his death, he was the earliest-serving living former governor of a U.S. state. Poletti also had the longest post-gubernatorial lifespan of any New York governor, nearly 60 years (1942–2002).

== Early life and education ==
Aldo Charles Poletti was born in Barre, Vermont to Dino Poletti (April 28, 1865, Pogno, Italy – February 12, 1922, Barre, Vermont) and Carolina (Gervasini) Poletti. Dino Poletti worked as a stonecutter in a Barre granite quarry.

Poletti intended to manage a bakery after graduating from Spaulding High School in 1920, but was encouraged by his principal to attend college. He attended Harvard University on a scholarship, and worked a variety of part-time jobs to finance his studies, including waiting tables, washing dishes, and tutoring. In 1924, he received his Bachelor of Arts degree in economics summa cum laude, was admitted to Phi Beta Kappa, and then studied at the University of Rome, the University of Bologna and the University of Madrid. Poletti later served on Harvard's Board of Overseers.

== Start of career ==
In 1928, Poletti graduated from Harvard Law School with a LL.B. degree, cum laude. After passing the bar exam he joined the New York City firm of 1924 Democratic presidential nominee John W. Davis.

In 1928 Poletti was active in the presidential campaign of Governor Alfred E. Smith, and in 1932 he became counsel to the Democratic National Committee. In addition, he was appointed to a seat on the state Board of Social Welfare.

In 1933 Poletti was appointed on Felix Frankfurter's recommendation to be counsel to Governor Herbert H. Lehman. Lehman relied heavily on Poletti, asked him to move into the executive mansion, and assigned him tasks from drafting legislation and speeches to lobbying for passage of New Deal measures advocated by the administration of President Franklin Roosevelt.

In 1937 Lehman appointed Poletti to a vacancy as a justice of the New York State Supreme Court, and later that year he was elected to a full 14-year term.

== Election as lieutenant governor and succession to governorship ==
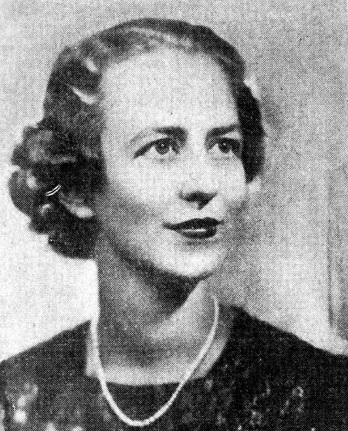
Jean Knox Ellis Poletti, President, New York State League of Women Voters, May, 1938. She resigned when her husband became a candidate for Lieutenant Governor

In 1938, Poletti was elected lieutenant governor of New York on the Democratic ticket with Lehman.

In 1939 Poletti was elected to the National Association for the Advancement of Colored People's board of directors. In 1940 he threw out the first pitch at a game between the New York Cubans and the New York Black Yankees, opening the season of the Negro National League with a speech advocating the integration of Major League Baseball.

Poletti, state Attorney General John J. Bennett Jr. and U.S. Senator James M. Mead were candidates for the Democratic nomination for governor in 1942. When party leaders coalesced around Bennett, Poletti withdrew and accepted renomination for lieutenant governor. Bennett defeated Mead for the gubernatorial nomination. The ticket of Bennett and Poletti were defeated in the general election by Thomas E. Dewey and Thomas W. Wallace.

When Lehman resigned as governor on December 3, 1942, to accept appointment as Director of Foreign Relief and Rehabilitation Operations for the United States Department of State, Poletti succeeded to the governorship. He served 29 days, the shortest term of any New York governor.

As governor, Poletti controversially pardoned three convicts with ties to labor unions, without consulting New York's parole board. These included Alexander Hoffman, a CIO official who had served just eight months of a four-to-eight year prison term for the attempted arson of a non-union laundry firm. In response to adverse media coverage, Poletti stated "I was advised that Hoffman enjoyed an excellent reputation as an honorable citizen [...] I acted honestly and I believe courageously on the basis of the facts submitted to me".

After leaving office Poletti was appointed special assistant to Secretary of War Henry L. Stimson. In this position he worked to racially integrate the military.

== World War II ==
On Dec. 27, 1942, Poletti broadcast for the Office of War Information a radio address in the Italian language to the Italian people, urging them to "throw out both Hitler and Mussolini."

In July 1943 Poletti was assigned to serve as a U.S. Army civil affairs officer in Italy, largely because as a first-generation Italian-American who had studied in Italy, was fluent in Italian and had served as a governor, he had an understanding of the local culture and sufficient stature to earn the Sicilian people's respect. Initially assigned to assist in restoring civil government in Palermo, he became responsible for rebuilding efforts throughout Sicily.

As the Allies continued to liberate mainland Italy Poletti's command followed to restore water and electricity, distribute food and water, and begin returning the formerly fascist country to democracy.

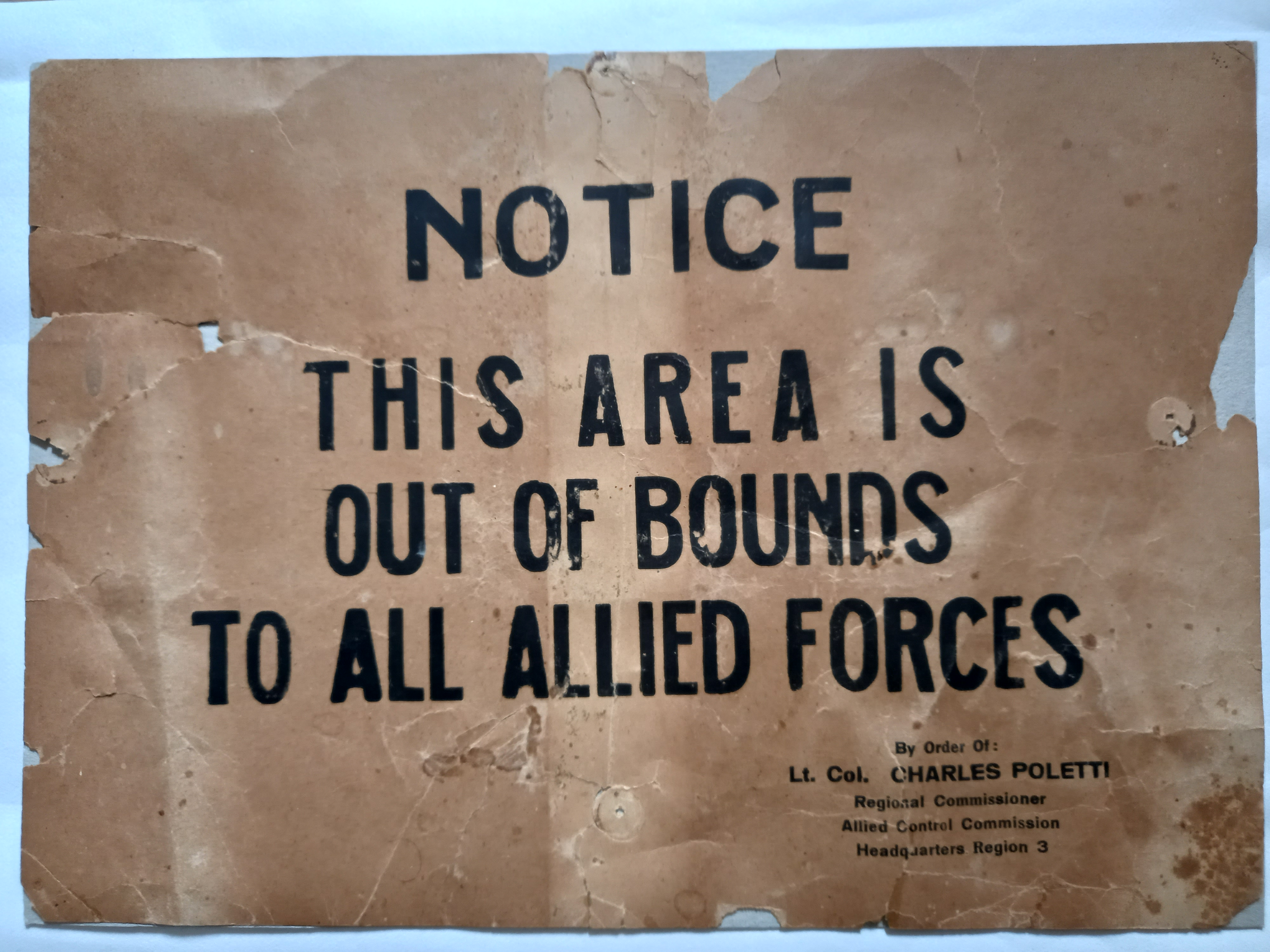
Notice by order of Lt. Col. Charles Poletti (Regional Commissioner - Allied Control Commission - Headquarters Region 3)

Some sources say that while Poletti served in Sicily his driver and interpreter was Mafia boss Vito Genovese, who had fled New York in the 1930s to escape prosecution for murder. Genovese was allegedly heavily involved in black-market activities with other Sicilian Mafiosi, including Calogero Vizzini. Another Mafia boss, Lucky Luciano, is also alleged to have once described Poletti as "one of our good friends." Poletti always said he had no connection to Genovese, Luciano, the Mafia, or black market activities. In a 1993 interview for BBC TV, Poletti said, "We had no problems at all with the Mafia. Nobody ever heard of it. While we were there, nobody heard of it. Nobody ever talked about it." In addition, the stories alleging a Genovese-Poletti connection fail to explain why Poletti would have needed an Italian language interpreter, given his fluency in Italian (including the Sicilian and Neapolitan dialects), Spanish, and German as the result of his heritage, his college studies, a job in his twenties working as a tour guide for college students visiting Europe, and his regular visits to his mother after she began residing in Italy following the death of his father.

== After World War II ==
After leaving the Army as a colonel Poletti became the senior partner in a Manhattan law firm, which was reorganized as Poletti, Diamond, Rabin, Freidin & MacKay, and later became known as Poletti, Freidin, Prashker, Feldman and Gartner From May 1946 to June 1947 he carried out an appointment as an arbitrator assigned to resolve labor disputes in New York City's clothing industry.

In 1955 Poletti was appointed to the New York State Power Authority, serving until 1960, the period in which the St. Lawrence Project and Niagara Project were built.

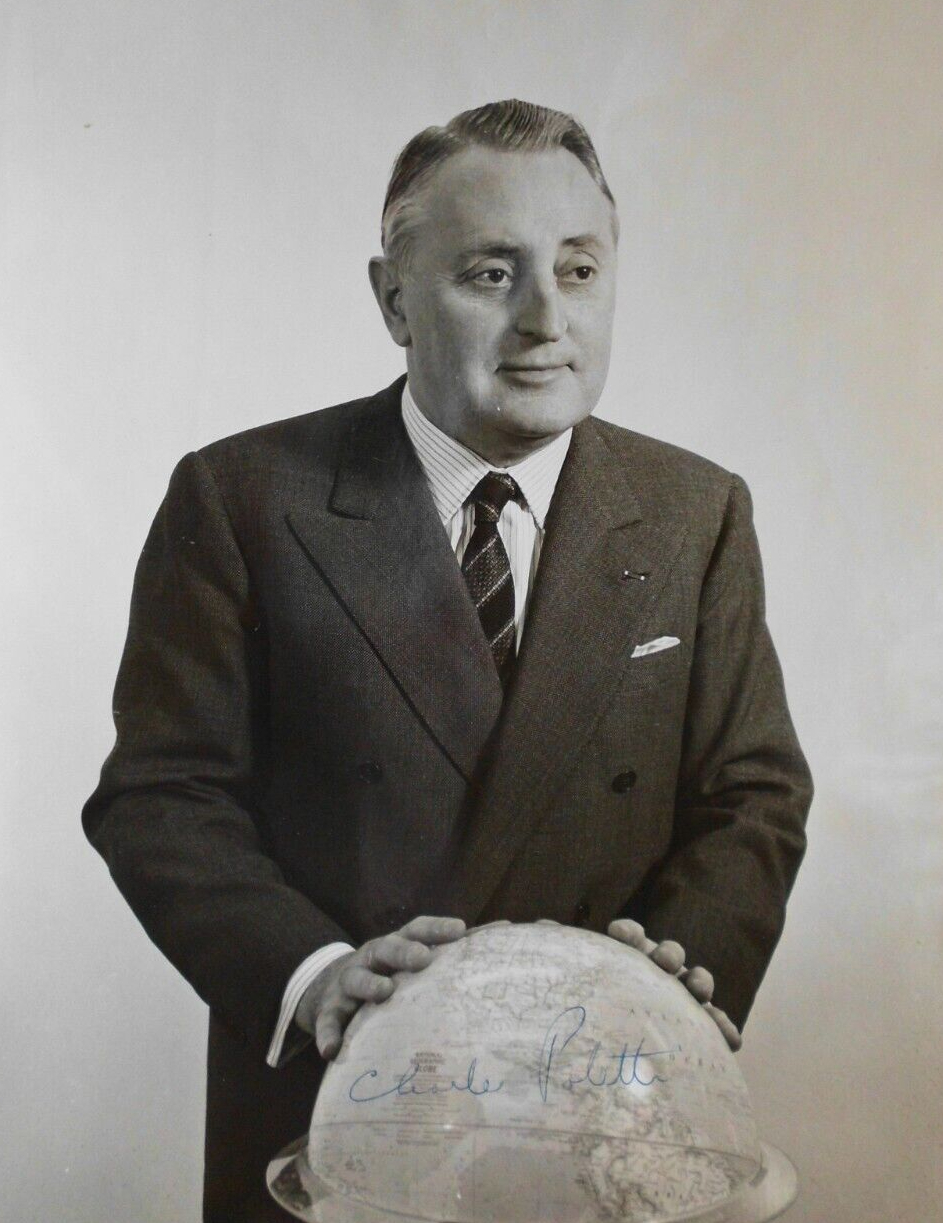
Poletti at the time of the World's Fair in 1964

From 1960 to 1965 he was the executive responsible for foreign exhibits at the 1964 New York World's Fair.

== Retirement and death ==
Poletti died at age 99 in his San Marco Island, Florida home. He was survived by his second wife, Elizabeth, and his children, Charles Poletti, Carla Tidmarsh, and Joanna Todisco. At the time of his death, he was the earliest-serving living former U.S. governor. He was interred at Calkins Cemetery in Elizabethtown, New York.

== Awards and honors ==
Poletti received the Legion of Merit for his service in Italy. In 1945 Poletti received the Order of Saint Gregory the Great from Pope Pius XII. In addition, Italy's government named him a Knight of the Grand Cross of the Crown of Italy. Poletti was named an Officer of the Order of the British Empire in 1948. For his work at the World's Fair Poletti received the Order of the Star of Jordan. He also received the Grand Officer of the Order of Saint Agatha of San Marino. The Charles Poletti Power Project (renamed in 1982 to honor him) was located in Astoria, Queens, across the East River from Manhattan in New York City. In 2002 it was scheduled to be closed, and it was shut down in February, 2010.

Party political offices
Preceded by M. William Bray	Democratic nominee for Lieutenant Governor of New York; 1938, 1942	Succeeded by William N. Haskell
Political offices
Preceded by M. William Bray	Lieutenant Governor of New York; 1939–1942	Succeeded by Joe R. Hanley; Acting
Preceded by Herbert H. Lehman	Governor of New York; 1942	Succeeded by Thomas E. Dewey
