= Harry D. Yates =

American banker and politician

Harry Douglas Yates

Acting Comptroller of New York
- In office October 12, 1941 – October 17, 1941
- Preceded by: Morris S. Tremaine
- Succeeded by: Joseph V. O'Leary

Personal details
- Born: July 21, 1903; Buffalo, New York, U.S.
- Died: October 9, 1996 (aged 93)

Harry Douglas Yates (July 21, 1903 in Buffalo, Erie County, New York – October 9, 1996 in Menands, Albany County, New York) was an American banker and politician from New York. He was for a short time Acting New York State Comptroller in 1941.

== Life ==
Yates was the son of Mary Theresa Duffy (1874-1956) and Harry Yates (1870-1956).He graduated B.S. from Hamilton College in 1925.

On April 27, 1932, he was appointed First Deputy Comptroller by Morris S. Tremaine. After Tremaine's death in office on October 12, 1941, Yates acted as Comptroller for a week until Governor Herbert H. Lehman appointed American Laborite Joseph V. O'Leary to fill the vacancy. Yates continued in office as First Deputy under O'Leary until November 1942 when he resigned to enter the U.S. Army and help with the war effort during World War II. He joined the Adjutant General's Corps stationed at Washington, D.C. While on leave in 1944, he married Anita Pohndorff (1914-1991) of Saratoga, New York.

He left the Army as a captain, and after his return to Albany, New York, managed the Dutch Village Apartments in Menands, NY, and became President of the Albany Home Savings Bank.

He was a trustee of Hamilton College, the Albany Institute of History and Art, and Siena College. He was awarded an honorary L.H.D. from Siena College in 1972, and the Distinguished Service Award from the Episcopal Bishop of Albany in 1973.

Political offices
Preceded by Morris S. Tremaine	New York State Comptroller; Acting; 1941	Succeeded by Joseph V. O'Leary
