= Joseph V. O'Leary =

American politician

Joseph Vincent O'Leary
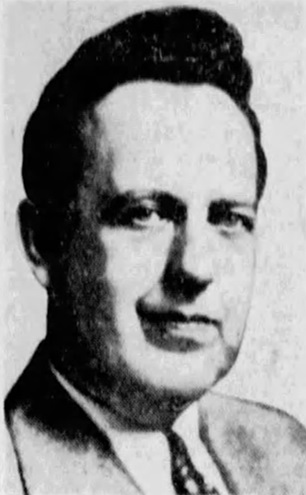
- The Buffalo News, October 18, 1941

47th Comptroller of New York
- In office October 17, 1941 – December 31, 1942
- Preceded by: Harry D. Yates (acting)
- Succeeded by: Frank C. Moore

Personal details
- Born: December 13, 1890; New York City, U.S.
- Died: December 29, 1964 (aged 74); Beth Israel Medical Center; Manhattan, New York City, U.S.
- Political party: American Labor

Joseph Vincent O'Leary (December 13, 1890 – December 29, 1964) was an American politician who served as New York State Comptroller.

== Life ==
He was born on December 13, 1890, in New York City.

In 1938, he ran on the American Labor ticket for New York State Attorney General, but was defeated.

He was New York State Commissioner of Standards and Purchase when Governor Herbert H. Lehman appointed O'Leary New York State Comptroller after the death of Morris S. Tremaine to fill the vacancy. Tremaine died on October 12, 1941, and O'Leary was appointed on October 17 with the understanding that he was nominated to run on the Democratic and American Labor tickets at a special election for Comptroller in November, but on October 27 the New York Court of Appeals ruled that no such special election is to be held and O'Leary continued in office until the end of 1942. He was defeated for re-election on both tickets in November 1942.

He was a founding member of the Liberal Party of New York, and was its Secretary in 1958.

He died on December 29, 1964, at Beth Israel Medical Center in Manhattan.

== Sources ==
- Political Graveyard
- CONTROLLER VOTE IN STATE BARRED BY APPEAL COURT in NYT on October 28, 1941 (subscription required)
- A.L.P. MAN NAMED TO TREMAINE JOB IN 2-PARTY DEAL in nYT on October 18, 1941 (subscription required)

Party political offices
Preceded by Morris S. Tremaine	Democratic nominee for New York State Comptroller; 1942	Succeeded by Spencer C. Young
Political offices
Preceded by Harry D. Yates; Acting	New York State Comptroller; 1941–1942	Succeeded by Frank C. Moore
