= 1936 New York state election =

- November 3, 1936

The 1936 New York state election was held on November 3, 1936, to elect the governor, the lieutenant governor, the state comptroller, the attorney general, a judge of the New York Court of Appeals and two U.S. Representatives-at-large, as well as all members of the New York State Assembly and the New York State Senate.

== Nominations ==
The Communist state convention met on June 14, and nominated Robert Minor for Governor; Julian S. Sawyer, of Buffalo, for Lieutenant Governor; and Irving Schwab, of New York City, for the Court of Appeals.

The Socialist state convention met on June 27 at the Hotel Delano in New York City, and nominated Dr. Harry W. Laidler for Governor; the Rev. Herman J. Hahn for Lieutenant Governor; Edward Marks of Freeport for Attorney General; and Coleman B. Cheney for Comptroller.

The Democratic state convention met on September 29 at Syracuse, New York, and re-nominated the incumbents Lehman, Bray, Tremaine and Bennett; and completed the ticket with Harlan W. Rippey for the Court of Appeals.

The Republican state convention met on September 29 at Albany, New York, and nominated New York Supreme Court Justice William F. Bleakley, of Yonkers, for Governor on the first ballot (vote: Bleakley 680, George R. Fearon 348). Frank Gannett and Joe R. Hanley were also contenders for the nomination. Also nominated were Col. Ralph K. Robertson for Lieutenant Governor; John A. May for Comptroller; Nathan D. Perlman for Attorney General; and James P. Hill for the Court of Appeals.

The American Labor Party filed on October 6 a petition to nominate only two candidates: Franklin D. Roosevelt for U.S. president and Herbert H. Lehman for governor.

== Result ==
The whole Democratic ticket was elected. The incumbents Lehman, Bray, Tremaine, Bennett, Merritt and O'Day were re-elected. This was the last election in which the Governor was elected every two years.

1936 state election results
Office	Democratic ticket		Republican ticket		American Labor ticket		Socialist ticket		Communist ticket	
Governor	Herbert H. Lehman	2,708,383	William F. Bleakley	2,450,104	Herbert H. Lehman	262,192	Harry W. Laidler	96,233	Robert Minor	40,406
Lieutenant Governor	M. William Bray	3,028,091	Ralph K. Robertson	2,136,506	(none)		Herman J. Hahn	100,151	Julian S. Sawyer	66,132
Comptroller	Morris S. Tremaine	3,088,246	John A. May	2,055,411	(none)		Coleman B. Cheney	99,184	Grace Hutchins	67,666
Attorney General	John J. Bennett Jr.	3,075,060	Nathan D. Perlman	2,093,162	(none)		Edward Marks	98,909	Fred Briehl	67,063
Judge of the Court of Appeals	Harlan W. Rippey	2,995,071	James P. Hill	2,098,630	(none)		Darwin J. Meserole	103,284	Irving Schwab	70,150
U.S. Representative-at-large	Matthew J. Merritt	3,013,931	Anthony J. Contiguglia	2,078,865	(none)		Frank R. Crosswaith	101,184	Roy Hudson	69,336
U.S. Representative-at-large	Caroline O'Day	2,992,057	Natalie F. Couch	2,078,803	(none)		Edna Mitchell Blue	102,133	Simon W. Gerson	68,868

Obs.: The vote for Governor is used to define ballot access.

== See also ==
- New York gubernatorial elections

== Sources ==
- Official Result: ROOSEVELT MARGIN 1,112,552 IN STATE; Official Canvass Gives Him 13 Counties, of Which 8 Were Outside New York City.; LEHMAN VOTE 2,970,595 Bleakley Was 520,491 Behind; Socialists Got 86,897; and the Communists 35,609 in NYT in December 1936 (subscription required)

Vote Totals-New York Red Book 1937
