= 1949 United States Senate special election in New York =

- November 8, 1949
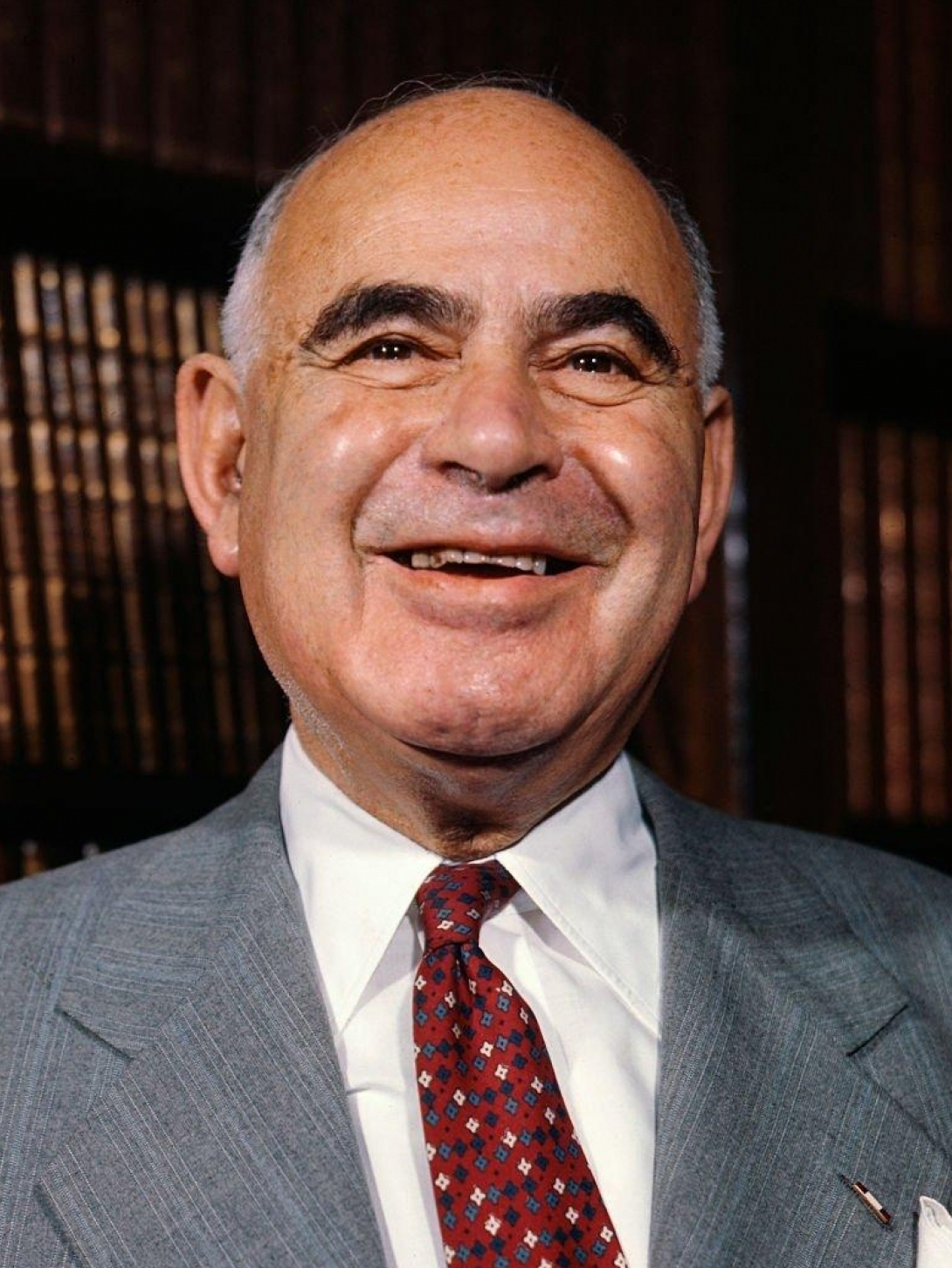

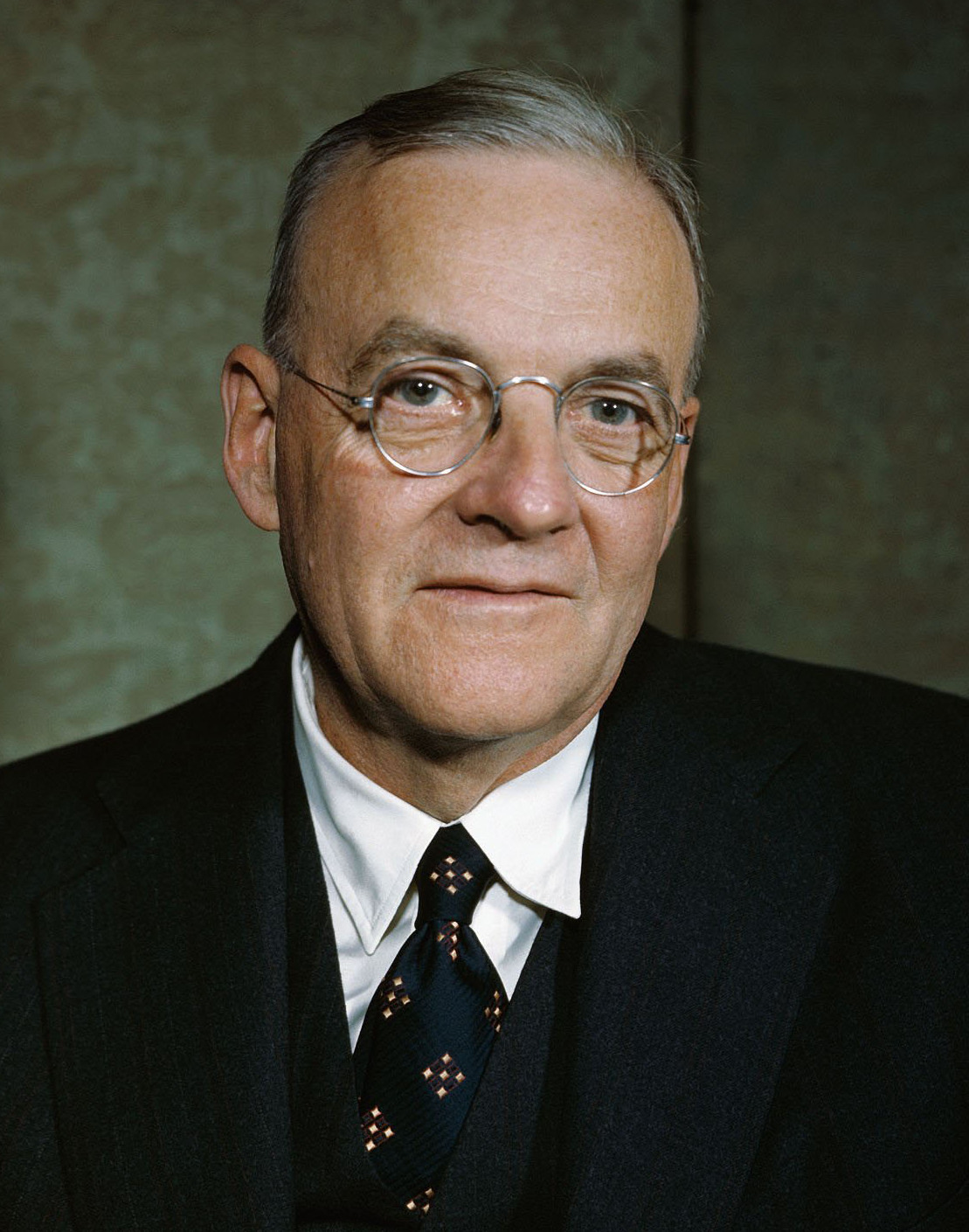
Nominee	Herbert H. Lehman	John Foster Dulles
Party	Democratic	Republican
Alliance	Liberal
Popular vote	2,582,438	2,384,381
Percentage	51.99%	48.01%
- County results Lehman: 50–60% 60–70% 70–80% Dulles: 50–60% 60–70% 70–80% >90%
Senator before election
John Foster Dulles
Republican
Elected Senator
Herbert H. Lehman
Democratic

The United States Senate special election of 1949 in New York was held on November 8, 1949. On June 28, 1949, incumbent senator Robert F. Wagner resigned due to ill health. On July 7, John Foster Dulles was appointed by Governor Thomas Dewey to fill the vacancy temporarily.

The Republican State Committee nominated Dulles to succeed himself. The Democratic State Committee nominated former Governor Herbert H. Lehman. The Liberal Party endorsed Lehman. The American Labor Party made no nominations and urged its members not to vote for any candidate. The Democratic/Liberal ticket was elected and Dulles was defeated.

== Background ==
Longtime incumbent Senator Robert F. Wagner resigned effective June 29, 1949, citing ill health. Governor Thomas E. Dewey appointed John Foster Dulles, his foreign policy advisor, to fill the vacant seat until a successor could be duly elected, and a special election to complete Wagner's term in office was scheduled for November 8, 1949, to coincide with the regularly scheduled state election.

== Democratic ==
Alex Rose, David Dubinsky, Adolf A. Berle, Americans for Democratic Action, and the International Ladies Garment Workers Union pushed for Herbert H. Lehman to seek the Democratic nomination.

== General election ==
=== Candidates ===
- Herbert H. Lehman, former Governor of New York (Democratic and Liberal)
- John Foster Dulles, incumbent Senator (appointed by Governor Dewey) and diplomat (Republican)

=== Campaigns ===
Dulles accused Lehman of working with communists while leading the United Nations Relief and Rehabilitation Administration and for accepting the support of the American Labor Party in previous elections. He also incorrectly claimed that the ALP also nominated Lehman.

Vito Marcantonio sought to have Henry A. Wallace run as the American Labor Party's nominee, which would have aided Marcantonio in the concurrent New York City mayoral election, but Wallace declined.

=== Results ===
The number of votes Lehman received on the Liberal line was greater than his margin of victory.

1949 U.S. Senate special election in New York
Party	Candidate	Votes	%
Democratic	Herbert H. Lehman	2,155,763	43.40%
Liberal	Herbert H. Lehman	426,675	8.59%
Total	Herbert H. Lehman	2,582,438	51.99%
Republican	John Foster Dulles (incumbent)	2,384,381	48.01%
Total votes		4,966,819	100.00%

== Works cited ==
- Schmidt, Karl (1960). Henry A. Wallace: Quixotic Crusade 1948. Syracuse University Press.
- Soyer, Daniel (2012). "'Support the Fair Deal in the Nation; Abolish the Raw Deal in the City': The Liberal Party in 1949". New York History. 93 (2). Cornell University Press: 147–81. doi:10.2307/23645398. JSTOR 23645398.
