= Langdon W. Post =

American politician (1899–1981)

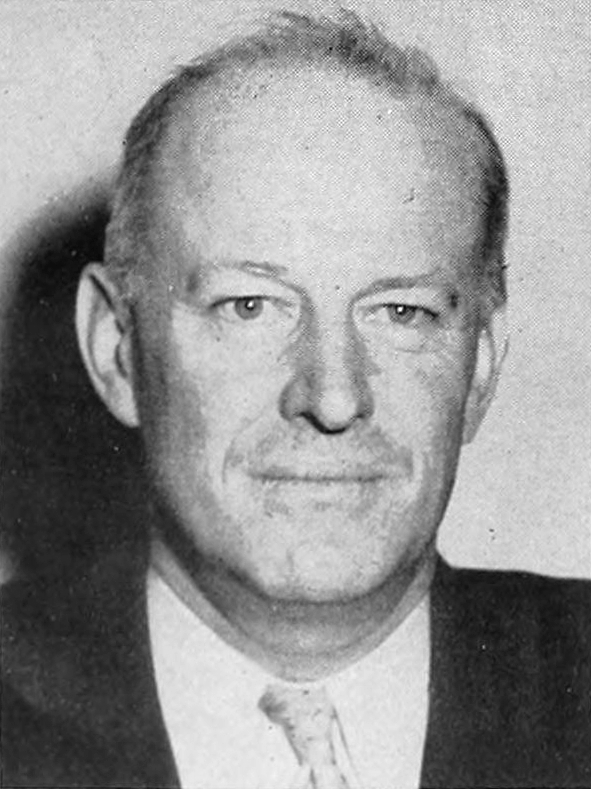
- Post c. 1943

Chairman of the New York City Housing Authority
- In office February 17, 1934 – December 1, 1937
- Appointed by: Fiorello La Guardia
- Preceded by: Office established
- Succeeded by: Lester B. Stone

New York City Tenement House Commissioner
- In office January 1, 1934 – December 31, 1937
- Appointed by: Fiorello La Guardia
- Preceded by: Charles F. Kerrigan

Member of the New York State Assembly from the 10th New York district
- In office January 1, 1929 – December 31, 1932
- Preceded by: Phelps Phelps
- Succeeded by: Herbert Brownell Jr.

Personal details
- Born: April 10, 1899 New York City, U.S.
- Died: September 2, 1981 (aged 82) San Francisco, California, U.S.
- Party: Democratic
- Other political affiliations: Citizens Union (1932); Republican (1933); City Fusion (1933); American Labor (1936–1940)
- Spouse(s): Janet Kirby (m. 1927; div. 1939) Margaret Solomon (m. 1940)
- Children: 3
- Relatives: Jotham Post Jr. (ancestor); Regis Henri Post (uncle); Erastus F. Post (cousin)
- Education: Harvard College (A.B.)
- Occupation: Politician

Military service
- Allegiance: United States
- Branch/service: United States Army
- Years of service: 1917–1919
- Rank: Corporal
- Unit: 1st Infantry Division
- Battles/wars: World War I; Battle of Cantigny; Battle of Soissons; Battle of Saint-Mihiel; Meuse–Argonne Offensive

Langdon Ward Post (April 10, 1899 – September 2, 1981) was an American politician and housing specialist who served in the New York State Assembly from 1929 to 1932, then as New York City tenement house commissioner and chairman of the newly-formed New York City Housing Authority from 1934 to 1937.

== Early life ==
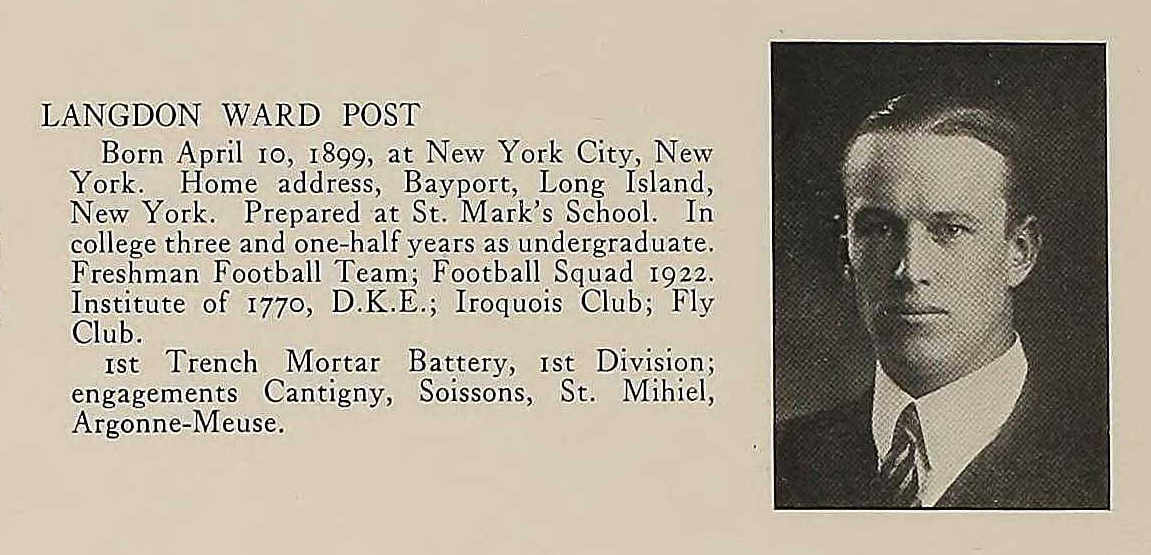
Post in the Harvard University yearbook, 1923

Langdon Ward Post was born in New York City on April 10, 1899. He was born into the Post political family; his uncle was state assemblyman Regis Henri Post, his distant cousin was former state assemblyman Erastus F. Post, and his great-great-great-great-grandfather was Federalist congressman Jotham Post Jr.

Shortly after graduating from St. Mark’s School, Post enlisted in the U.S. Army in August 1917, serving in the First Trench Mortar Battery of the 1st Infantry Division of the American Expeditionary Forces. He saw combat at Cantigny, Soissons, Saint-Mihiel, and the Meuse–Argonne. He was honorably discharged in May 1919, and graduated from Harvard College in February 1923.

Post proceeded to work several jobs; he worked in a factory, in the Oklahoma oil fields, and in a brokerage office before joining the staff of the New York Evening World in 1925.

== Political career ==
=== State Assembly ===
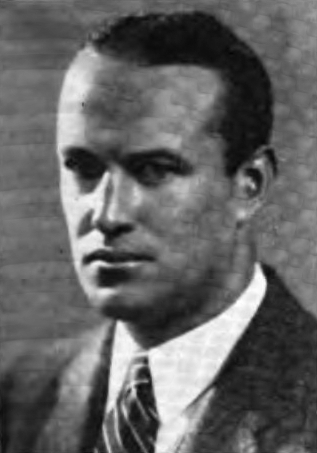
Post's official State Assembly portrait, 1929

Post first ran for public office in 1927, campaigning for State Assembly in the 10th New York County district as a Democrat. Losing by just 529 votes, Post tried again the next year and narrowly won with 440 votes.

Post was re-elected in 1929, 1930 and 1931, serving at the same time as governor Franklin D. Roosevelt. In the State Assembly, he became an ally of the governor's and aided in the passage of housing legislation. He also authored a bill to protect young girls from being convicted on prostitution charges on the uncorroborated testimony of a single witness.

Post was once again a candidate for re-election in 1932, but his anti-Tammany stances led to his replacement on the Democratic ballot line, forcing him to run under the Citizens Union ticket. He came in third place with 24% of the vote, splitting the Democratic vote and leading to the election of future United States Attorney General Herbert Brownell Jr.

=== Housing Authority ===
In the 1933 elections, Post allied with former congressman Fiorello La Guardia, who was running for mayor of New York City, and became the Republican-City Fusion candidate for Manhattan Borough President. Although he narrowly lost, La Guardia won, the first Republican (and first anti-Tammany) candidate to do so in 20 years. Post was rewarded with the position of tenement house commissioner and was sworn in on January 1, 1934.

The next month, the New York City Housing Authority was established to carry out "the clearance, replanning, and reconstruction of the areas in which unsanitary or substandard housing conditions exist." Charged with appointing all five of its members, La Guardia chose Post to serve as its chairman. His colleagues were social worker Mary Kingsbury Simkhovitch, housing advocate Louis H. Pink, Jewish Daily Forward general manager Baruch Charney Vladeck, and Catholic priest Edward R. Moore. Their budget, secured by La Guardia from Public Works Administration head Harold Ickes, was $25 million, a fourth of the PWA's entire housing budget.

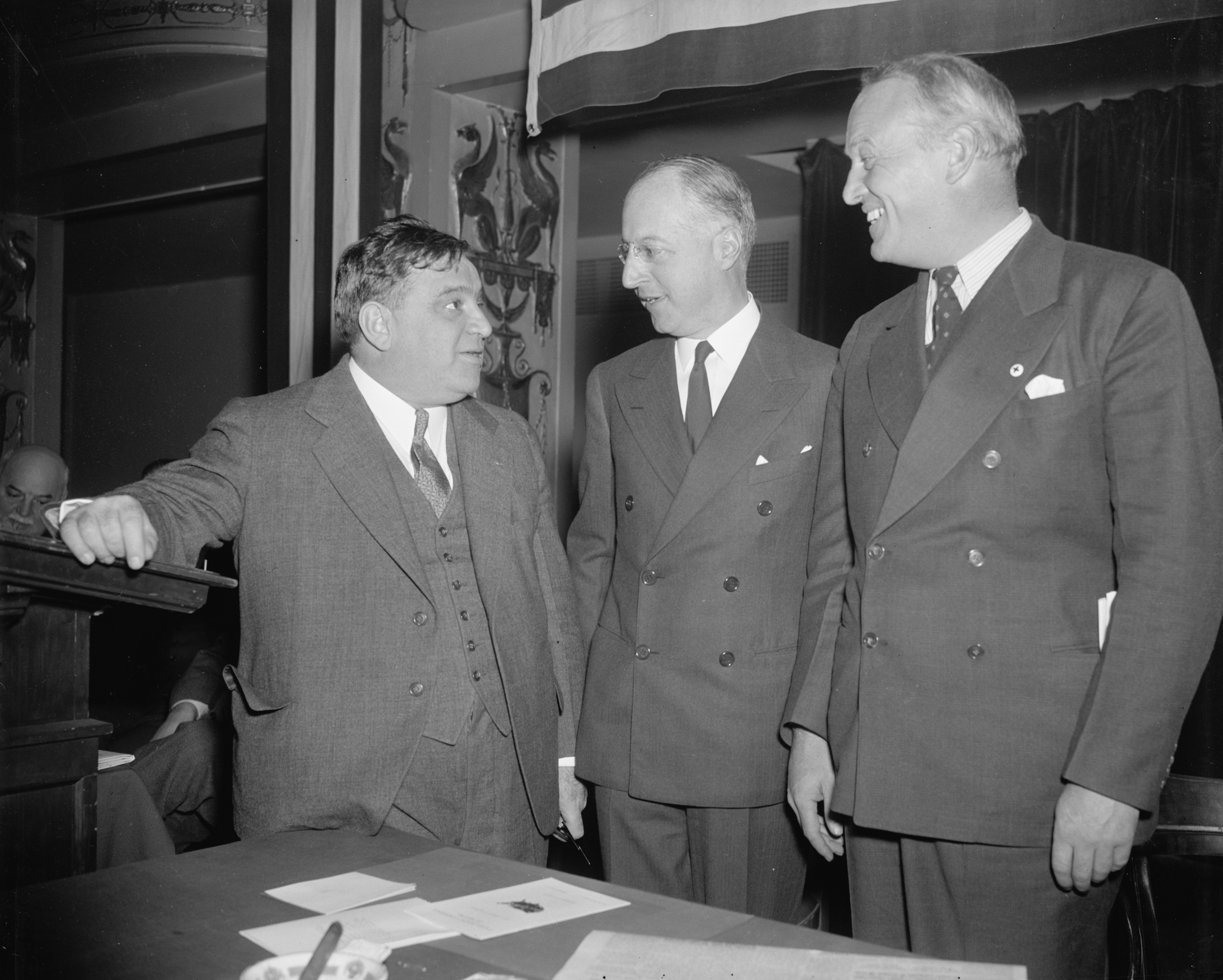
Post (right) alongside New York City mayor Fiorello La Guardia and Nathan Straus Jr. at the Annual Conference of Mayors in Washington, D.C., November 17, 1937

During his time in these positions, Post was credited with improving conditions in Old Law Tenements and presiding over the construction of new public housing projects like the Williamsburg Houses in Brooklyn. He also spoke out about the "tragic" and "appalling" housing conditions of New York City's African-American population.

He crossed party lines in 1934 to endorse Vladeck, a Socialist, for Congress in the 8th district. They both joined the American Labor Party in 1936, with Post standing as the party's candidate for New York State Comptroller in 1938 and New York City Councilman from Manhattan in 1939, both times unsuccessfully.

Post held the offices of tenement house commissioner and NYCHA chairman until 1937, when friction with mayor La Guardia led him to resign in anger. He moved to the West Coast in 1940 and became regional director of the Federal Public Housing Authority, serving until the agency's dissolution in 1947. He had previously served as assistant federal relief administrator, where he helped create the Works Progress Administration.

=== Spanish Civil War ===
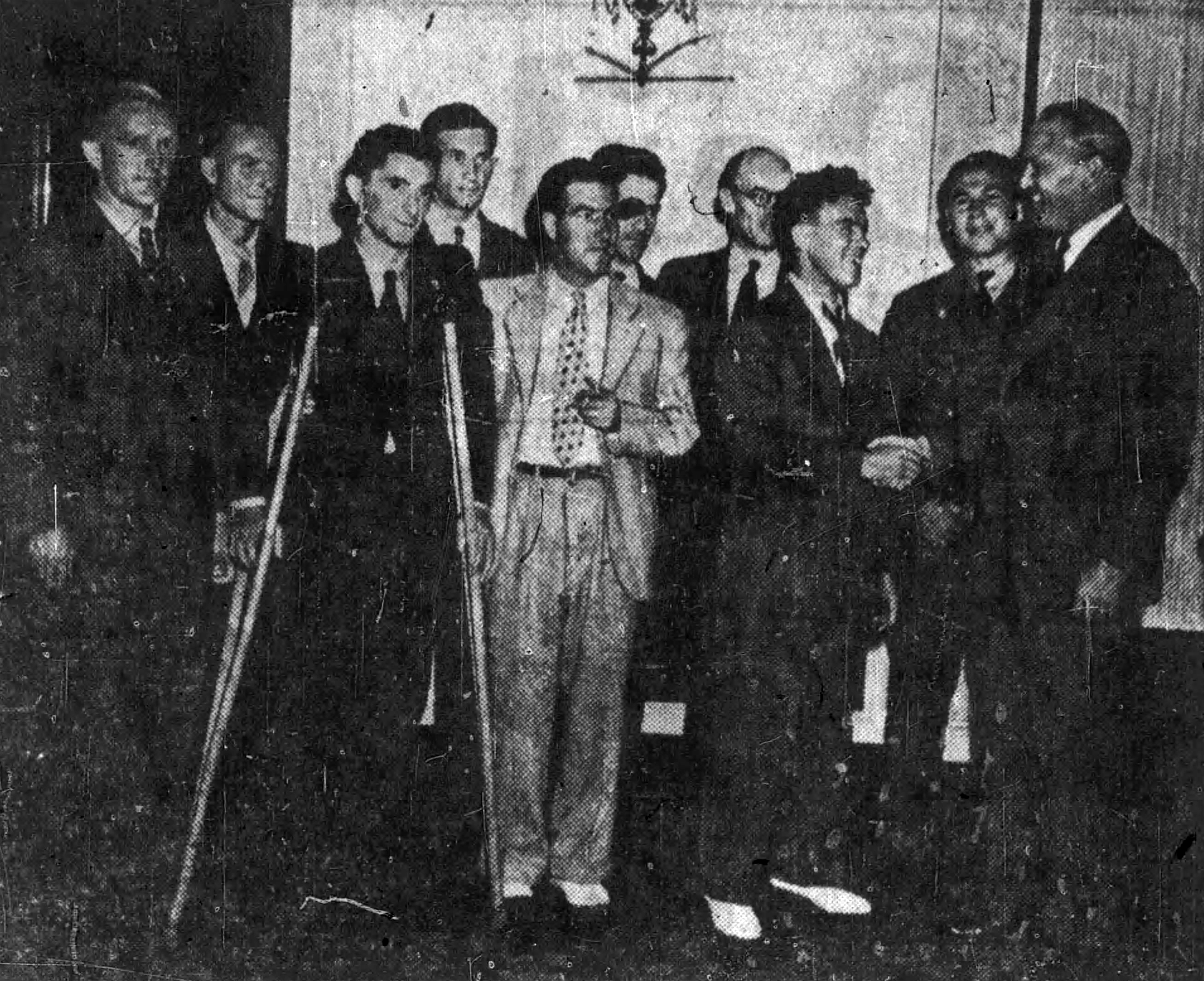
Post (far right) greets wounded veterans of the Abraham Lincoln Brigade at the Commodore Hotel, July 14, 1938

During the Spanish Civil War, Post was an active member of the Friends of the Abraham Lincoln Brigade, at one time serving as New York chairman of the group. He opposed the American arms embargo against Spain, and raised money to bring wounded American volunteers home.

== Later life and death ==
Post remained active in Democratic Party politics and contributed to a number of magazines and papers. He served as a field representative for the Job Corps from 1965 until his retirement in 1972. He died of heart failure on September 2, 1981, in San Francisco.

== Works ==
- The Challenge of Housing (1938). New York: Farrar & Rinehart.

New York State Assembly
| Preceded by Phelps Phelps | New York State Assembly; New York County, 10th District; 1929-1932 | Succeeded by Herbert Brownell Jr. |
