= Franca Somigli =

Franca Somigli at La Scala during the 1942–1943 season.

Franca Somigli (born Marion Bruce Clark, March 17, 1901 – May 14, 1974) was an American soprano who had a career in opera from 1927 until the end of World War II. Born in Chicago, she was trained as singer in New York and Milan. While she performed as a guest artist at opera houses around the world, her career was mainly centered in Italy. She was particularly active with La Scala in Milan and the Teatro dell'Opera di Roma.

== Early life and education ==
Marion Bruce Clark was born on March 17, 1901, in Chicago, Illinois. Her uncle was the American politician Morris S. Tremaine. She was educated at the Ursuline Academy, the Spence School in New York City, Stetson University in Florida, and the College of New Rochelle in New York. She first studied singing in New York with Carlo Edwards; an assistant conductor at the Metropolitan Opera ("the Met") who taught at the Milan Conservatory prior to coming to the United States. She subsequently studied singing in Milan with Mario Malatesta, Rosina Storchio and Antonino Votto.

== Career ==
In Italy Clark adopted the stage name of Franca Somigli. She made her opera debut in Rovigo in 1927 as Mimì in Puccini's La bohème, and the following year had success as Leonora in Verdi's Il trovatore at the Teatro Fraschini in Pavia. She appeared in opera houses throughout Italy in roles like Kundry in Parsifal, Minnie in La fanciulla del West, Sieglinde in Die Walküre, and the title roles in Fedora and Salome. From 1933 to 1944 she performed regularly at both La Scala in Milan and the Teatro dell'Opera di Roma. In June 1934 she portrayed Donna Ines in Felice Lattuada's Don Giovanni at La Scala. The following November she gave her first performance with Chicago Grand Opera Company as Maddalena di Coigny in Andrea Chénier with Giovanni Martinelli in the title role.

In 1935 Somigli portrayed Contarina in the world premiere of Ildebrando Pizzetti’s Orséolo at the Maggio Musicale Fiorentino with Tullio Serafin leading the musical forces. She later repeated this role at the Teatro Colón in Buenos Aires in 1938. In 1936 she portrayed Alice Ford in Falstaff at the Salzburg Festival (SF) with Mariano Stabile in the title role and Arturo Toscanini conducting. She returned to the SF for further performances in 1937 and 1939; notably recording Falstaff in her 1937 appearance at the SF.

In March 1937 Somigli gave her first performance at the Metropolitan Opera ("the Met") as Cio-Cio-San in Madama Butterfly under the baton of Ettore Panizza with Frederick Jagel as Pinkerton. That same month she sang Mimì to Giovanni Martinelli's Rudolfo at the Met under conductor Gennaro Papi. In May 1937 she performed the role of Roxane in Franco Alfano's Cyrano de Bergerac at the Teatro Colón. In 1938 she portrayed Marinella in the world premiere of Franco Vittadini's Caracciolo at the Teatro dell'Opera di Roma, and sang in the world premiere of Renzo Bianchi's Proserpina at La Scala.

Somigli was active as guest artist in opera houses in Germany during World War II; including singing the title role in Richard Strauss's Salome at the Berlin State Opera in 1944. She married the Italian conductor Giuseppe Antonicelli who was head of the Teatro Lirico Giuseppe Verdi in Trieste. She retired around the time that World War II ended, and was thereafter active as a voice teacher in Trieste.

== Personal life and death ==
Somigli and her husband had one child, a daughter named Donatella. She died in Trieste on May 14, 1974.
