= Charles Poletti Power Project =

Former power station

Coordinates: 40.7797°N 73.9058°W

The Charles Poletti Power Project was a power station located in northwestern Queens, named after politician Charles Poletti. An 885-megawatt oil and natural gas-fired facility originally known as Astoria 6, it started generating electricity in 1977, and was gradually phased out starting in 2002, replaced by a newer, cleaner facility on the same site in 2005, Astoria Energy. The plant was shuttered in 2010 following a lawsuit and years of community opposition. It was one of the dirtiest power plants in the state while it was operating, and pollution from the plant was said to contribute to high rates of asthma in the surrounding neighborhood of Astoria, giving it the nickname "Asthma Alley". In 2021, New York State approved a plan to build a 100-megawatt battery system, the East River Storage System, on the site, in order to store and discharge renewable energy.

== History ==
The facility was initially called Astoria 6, and it was purchased by the New York Power Authority from Consolidated Edison in 1974, when the unit was still under construction. It was named after Poletti, who was a NYPA trustee. It began generating power in 1977, and was converted to dual-fuel capability in 1980. However, primarily due to its oil fuel, it released large amounts of pollution into the surrounding neighborhood for decades. In 2002, the NYPA made a joint agreement with the State Department of Environmental Conservation, the City of New York, the Borough of Queens, and other parties to phase out the plant. Its output was curtailed, and a new 500-megawatt natural gas-fired plant was constructed nearby, which began operation in December 2005.

Currently, there are two plants nearby on the same site, Astoria Energy I and II, that replaced the Poletti plant. Combined, they generate almost 1.2 gigawatts of electricity. Both utilize a pair of GE 7FA gas turbines. One contains an Alstom steam turbine, while the other uses a GE D11 steam turbine. Both, while still fossil fuel-powered, are among the most efficient in the country, and use less fuel than the previous plant.

New York State regulators approved a 100-megawatt battery system on the site in 2021 for clean energy storage.

== Controversy ==
The facility raised large amounts of community opposition due to its pollution, which gave the area the nickname "Asthma Alley". According to a report by the Environmental Protection Agency, the Poletti plant accounted for more emissions than all sources in Brooklyn, Manhattan, Staten Island and The Bronx combined. George Stamatiades, president of the Central Astoria Local Development Coalition, claimed that no birds would nest in Astoria due to the levels of pollution. Tony Gigantiello, president of the Coalition Helping to Organize a Kleaner Environment, or CHOKE, sued the Power Authority to close the plant. City councilman Peter Vallone Jr. called it "probably the dirtiest plant in the state while it was operating" and "an ugly eyesore".

A 500 MW peaker plant that had been run by NRG Energy on the same site since 1999, containing a pair of 1970s Pratt & Whitney gas turbines, was scheduled for closure in May 2023 after the New York State Department of Environmental Conservation determined its emissions violated the Climate Leadership and Community Protection Act. NRG proposed replacing it with new turbines that would operate until 2040, but the plans were rejected by the state. An amended plan with a single turbine was still "slammed" by the community and condemned by State Senator Michael Gianaris, who called it "destructive". The site was subsequently sold to Beacon Wind Energy for US$215.5 million to enable a connection to an offshore wind farm instead, hailed as a clean energy victory. A new six-mile transmission line connecting the Rainey and Corona substations was opened to coincide with the plant's decommissioning on May 1, 2023, and render the plant's additional capacity superfluous.
