= Giuseppe Antonicelli =

Italian conductor

Giuseppe Antonicelli (Castrovillari, 1897 - Trieste, 10 March 1980) was an Italian conductor who was highly active with Italy's leading opera houses from the 1920s through the 1950s. Among the houses he conducted at were, La Scala in Milan, the Teatro Regio di Torino, Teatro San Carlo in Naples, La Fenice in Venice, the Teatro Donizetti in Bergamo, the Teatro Nuovo in Turin, and the Teatro Lirico Giuseppe Verdi in Trieste. He also conducted a total of 158 performances at the Metropolitan Opera in New York City in 1948–1950.

Antonicelli died on 10 March 1980 in Trieste. His wife was the soprano Franca Somigli with whom he had a daughter, Donatella.
