= 1950 United States Senate election in New York =

- November 7, 1950
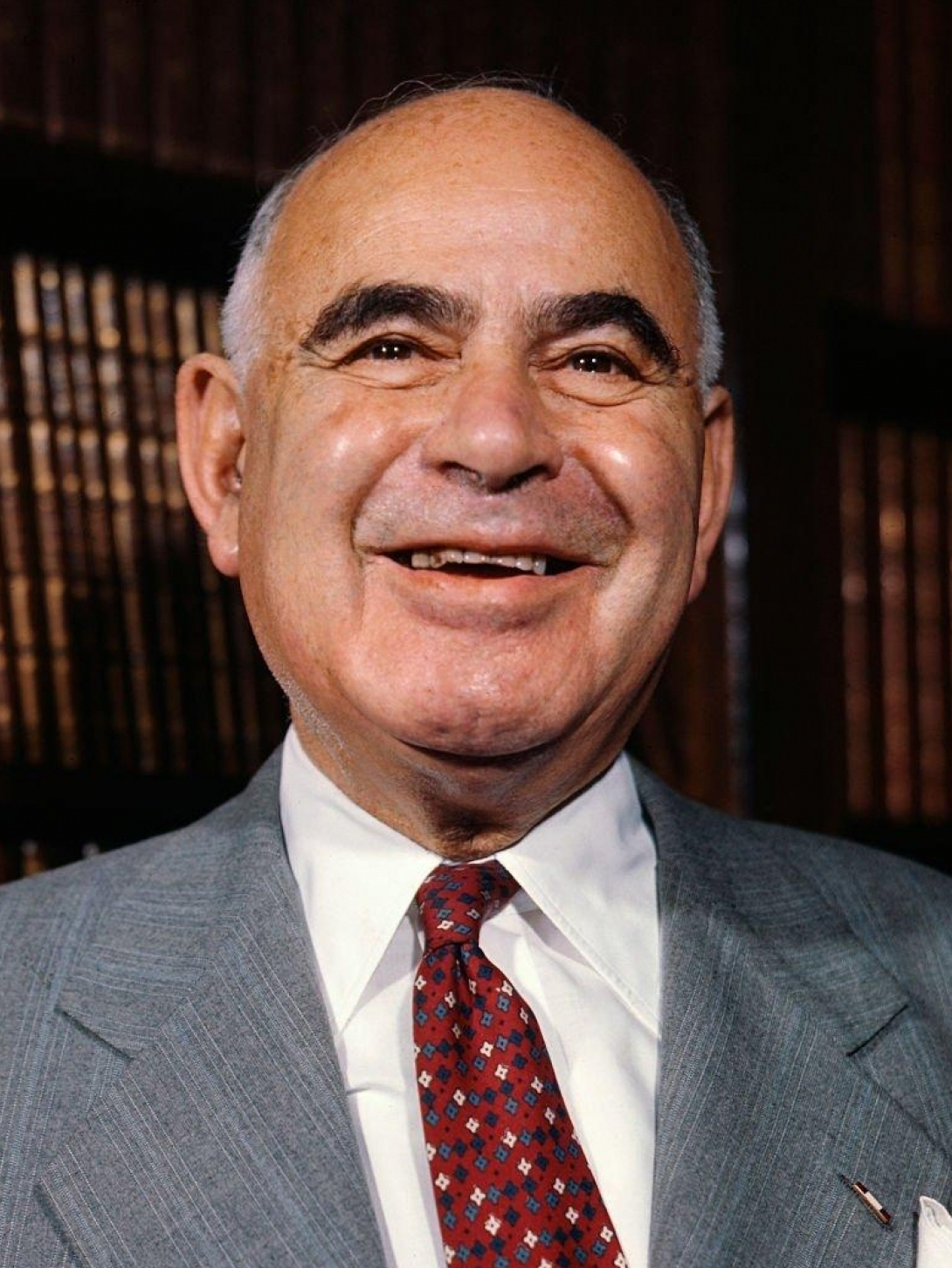

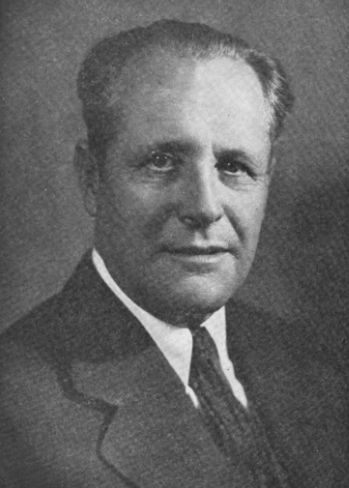
Nominee	Herbert H. Lehman	Joe Hanley
Party	Democratic	Republican
Alliance	Liberal
Popular vote	2,632,313	2,367,353
Percentage	50.35%	45.28%
- County results Lehman: 40–50% 50–60% 60–70% Hanley: 40–50% 50–60% 60–70% 70–80%
Senator before election
Herbert H. Lehman
Democratic
Elected Senator
Herbert H. Lehman
Democratic

The United States Senate election of 1950 in New York was held on November 7, 1950. Incumbent Democratic Senator Herbert H. Lehman was re-elected to a full term in office over Republican Joe Hanley.

This election is also noted for the campaign of African-American cultural and civil rights icon W. E. B. Du Bois, who ran at age 82 on the American Labor Party ticket.

== General election ==
=== Candidates ===
- W. E. B. DuBois, African-American icon and co-founder of the NAACP (American Labor)
- Stephen Emery, subway dispatcher and Socialist Labor nominee for vice president in 1948 (Socialist Labor)
- Joe Hanley, Lieutenant Governor of New York (Republican)
- Joseph Hansen, Trotskyist activist (Socialist Workers)
- Herbert H. Lehman, incumbent Senator (Democratic)

=== Results ===
1950 United States Senate election in New York
Party	Candidate	Votes	%
Democratic	Herbert H. Lehman (incumbent)	2,319,719	44.37%
Liberal	Herbert H. Lehman (incumbent)	312,594	5.98%
Total	Herbert H. Lehman (incumbent)	2,632,313	50.35%
Republican	Joe Hanley	2,367,353	45.28%
American Labor	W. E. B. Du Bois	205,729	3.94%
Socialist Workers	Joseph Hansen	15,340	0.29%
Socialist Labor	Stephen Emery	7,659	0.15%
Total votes		5,228,394	100.00%
