= 1938 New York state election =

- November 8, 1938

The 1938 New York state election was held on November 8, 1938, to elect the governor, the lieutenant governor, the state comptroller, the attorney general, two U.S. senators and two U.S. representatives-at-large, as well as all members of the New York State Assembly and the New York State Senate. The 1938 election was the first election where the governor of New York was elected to a four-year term, rather than a two-year term as had been used since the 1894 election.

== Nominations ==
The Republican state convention met on September 29, Speaker Oswald D. Heck presided. They nominated D.A. of New York Thomas E. Dewey for governor. Also nominated were Frederic H. Bontecou for lieutenant governor; Julius Rothstein for comptroller; Col. Arthur V. McDermott for attorney general; and John Lord O'Brian and Edward Corsi for the U.S. Senate.

The Democratic state convention met on October 1, and re-nominated the incumbents Lehman, Tremaine, Bennett and Wagner; and completed the ticket with Supreme Court Justice Charles Poletti for lieutenant governor; and John M. Mead for short term in the U.S. Senate.

The Socialist state convention met on October 1, and nominated again Norman Thomas for governor; and Dr. George W. Hartmann for lieutenant governor; Coleman B. Cheney for Comptroller; and Miss Marion L. Severn for attorney general.

The American Labor state convention met on October 3 at the Manhattan Opera House in New York City and nominated the Democratic incumbent Herbert H. Lehman for governor. They also endorsed Democrats Poletti, Wagner, Mead, Merritt and O'Day; and completed the ticket with Langdon W. Post for Comptroller and Joseph V. O'Leary for Attorney-General. Lehman was only able to win reelection due to the votes he received on the American Labor ballot line. Dewey received more votes on the Republican ballot line than Lehman had on the Democratic ballot line.

The "Independent Progressive" Party filed a petition to nominate a ticket headed by Republican Thomas E. Dewey. This was done to have a second ballot line, like Gov. Lehman who ran on two lines also.

The Socialist Labor Party changed its name and filed a petition to nominate candidates as the "Industrial Government Party."

== Result ==
The whole Democratic ticket was elected.

The incumbents Lehman, Tremaine, Bennett, Wagner, Merritt and O'Day were re-elected. This was the first election where governors were elected to four year terms.

1938 state election results
Office	Democratic ticket		Republican ticket		American Labor ticket		Communist ticket		Socialist ticket		Independent Progressive ticket		Industrial Government ticket	
Governor	Herbert H. Lehman	1,971,307	Thomas E. Dewey	2,302,505	Herbert H. Lehman	419,979	(none)		Norman Thomas	24,980	Thomas E. Dewey	24,387	Aaron M. Orange	3,516
Lieutenant Governor	Charles Poletti	1,976,166	Frederic H. Bontecou	2,130,088	Charles Poletti	395,313			George W. Hartmann (Note: Dr. George Wilfried Hartmann (1904-1955), psychologist, of Columbia University, editor of The Social Frontier, ran also for Mayor of New York in 1941)	29,282	Frederic H. Bontecou	12,030	Jacob Berlin	4,012
Comptroller	Morris S. Tremaine	2,220.931	Julius Rothstein	1,829,006	Langdon W. Post (Note: Langdon W. Post (1899-1981), Harvard graduate, Dem. assemblyman 1929-32, Chairman of the New York City Housing Authority under Mayor La Guardia, "LANGDON W. POST, 82, DEAD; HOUSING AND LABOR ADVISOR", The New York Times, September 5, 1981 (subscription required))	413,234			Langdon W. Post	25,910	Julius Rothstein	10,703	Jacob Grossman	4,323
Attorney General	John J. Bennett Jr.	2,151,831	Arthur V. McDermott (Note: Col. Arthur V. McDermott, of Brooklyn, lawyer, during World War II New York City Director of the Selective Service Administration)	1,950,187	Joseph V. O'Leary	391,901			Joseph O'Leary	23,963	Arthur V. McDermott	11,044	Frank Passonno	8.756
U.S. Senator (full term)	Robert F. Wagner	2,098,919	John Lord O'Brian	2,046,794	Robert F. Wagner	398,410			Herman J. Hahn (Note: Rev. Herman J. Hahn, of Buffalo, ran also for Lieutenant Governor in 1928 and 1936)	23,553	John Lord O'Brian	11,821	O. Martin Olson (Note: O. Martin Olson, of Jamestown, ran also for Comptroller in 1934)	3,851
U.S. Senator (short term) (Note: to fill the vacancy caused by the death of Royal S. Copeland)	James M. Mead	2,060,876	Edward F. Corsi	2,083,666	James M. Mead	378,028			Harry W. Laidler	27,161				
U.S. Representative-at-large	Matthew J. Merritt	2,023,131	Richard B. Scandrett Jr.	1,980,352	Matthew J. Merritt	329,029	Israel Amter	105,681	Brendan Sexton	24,990	Richard B. Scandrett	10,103	Jeremiah D. Crowley (Note: Jeremiah D. Crowley, of Marcellus, ran also for State Engineer in 1910; for Lieutenant Governor in 1912, 1914 and 1920; for Governor in 1916, 1922, 1926 and 1930; for the U.S. Senate in 1932; and for Congress at-large in 1934)	5,080
U.S. Representative-at-large	Caroline O'Day	2,024,135	Helen Z. M. Rodgers	2,000,814	Caroline O'Day	339,328			Edna Mitchell Blue (Note: Edna Mitchell Blue, wife of Lewi Tonks, ran also in 1938)	25,214	Helen Z.M. Rogers	10,753	William Herlet	4,291

Obs.:

- "Blank, void and scattering" votes: 75,047 (Governor)
- The vote for governor is used to define ballot access, for all other offices numbers are totals on all tickets for candidates nominated on more than one.

== See also ==
- New York gubernatorial elections
- New York state elections

== Sources ==
- Official Result: "LEHMAN PLURALITY OFFICIALLY 64,394; State Board Puts His Vote Finally at 2,391,286, With 2,326,892 for Dewey LABOR'S POLL AT 419,979 Blank, Void and Scattered Ballots Totaled 75,047; Poletti Won by 229,361", The New York Times, December 8, 1938 (subscription required)

New York Red Book
