= Morris S. Tremaine =

American businessman (1871–1941)

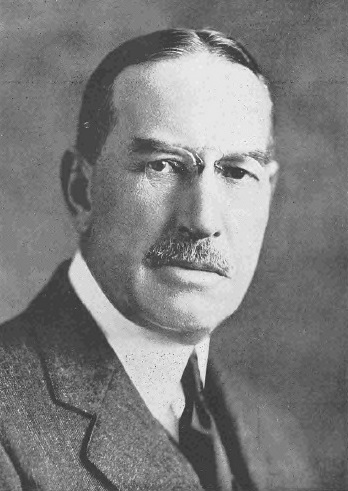

New York State Comptroller
- In office 1927–1941

Personal details
- Born: Morris Sawyer Tremaine; February 27, 1871 Fort Dodge, Kansas, U.S.
- Died: October 12, 1941 (aged 70) Albany, New York, U.S.
- Party: Democratic

Morris Sawyer Tremaine (February 27, 1871 – October 12, 1941) was an American businessman and Democratic Party politician from Buffalo, New York. He served as New York State Comptroller for almost 15 years.

== Life ==
Tremaine was born in Fort Dodge, Kansas on February 27, 1871. He was the son of William Scott Tremaine, an army surgeon from New York stationed at Fort Dodge, who was among the founders of the Town of Dodge City, Kansas in 1872. Tremaine lived with his family at Fort Dodge and in Cobourg, Ontario, Canada before they settled in Buffalo, New York when he was 10 years old.

Tremaine attended both public and private schools in Buffalo, and graduated from Upper Canada College in Toronto at the age of 17. He started work at age 17 as a tally boy on the Buffalo docks for the Holland, Graves & Montgomery wholesale lumber firm. (Tally boys aided ship's crews and merchants in the counting and weighing of cargo being loaded and unloaded.) He worked his way through the company ranks to become a salesman, and later opened and managed a New York City branch office.

In 1897, Tremaine was appointed secretary of a wholesale lumber business, Montgomery Bros. & Co. In 1903 he was appointed president of the Toledo Fire & Marine Insurance Company. In 1905 he was named president of the National Lumber Insurance Company of Buffalo. Also in 1905, Tremaine became vice president of the Montgomery Lumber Company of Suffolk, Virginia. In 1914, he joined the J. G. Wilson Corporation, makers of rolling steel doors and folding partitions, and he was the company's president when he retired in 1930. In 1923, he was elected vice president of Smith, Fassett & Co., a wholesale lumber dealer in North Tonawanda, New York. Tremaine served on the board of directors of the National Wholesale Lumber Association. He was also an organizer of the King Sewing Machine Company, which was later purchased by Sears, Roebuck & Co.

During World War I Tremaine was involved in organizing several Liberty Loan bond drives, in addition to being one of the largest purchasers of the bonds himself.

Tremaine was New York State Comptroller from 1927 to 1941, elected in 1926, 1928, 1930, 1932, 1934, 1936, and 1938. He died in Albany, New York on October 12, 1941, while in the middle of his seventh term. He was buried at Forest Lawn Cemetery in Buffalo.

== Family ==
On June 21, 1898, he married Maude Middledith in Plainfield, New Jersey. They were the parents of two sons, businessmen Lawrence Tremaine of Buffalo, and James G. Tremaine of New York City. His niece was the operatic soprano Franca Somigli.

Party political offices
Preceded by James W. Fleming	Democratic nominee for New York State Comptroller; 1926, 1928, 1930, 1932, 1934, 1936, 1938	Succeeded by Joseph V. O'Leary
Political offices
Preceded by Vincent B. Murphy	New York State Comptroller; 1927–1941	Succeeded by Harry D. Yates; Acting
