= John J. Bennett Jr. =

American politician

John James Bennett Jr.
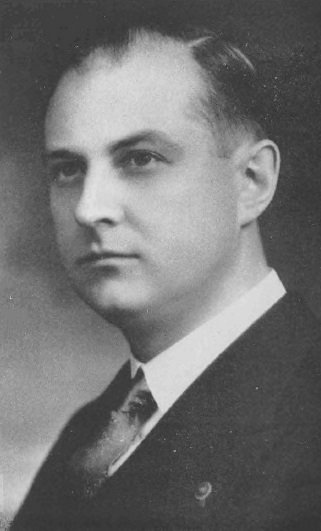

56th New York State Attorney General
- In office January 1, 1931 – December 31, 1942
- Governor: Franklin D. Roosevelt; Herbert H. Lehman
- Preceded by: Hamilton Ward Jr.
- Succeeded by: Nathaniel L. Goldstein

Personal details
- Born: 2 March 1894 Brooklyn, New York, U.S.
- Died: 4 October 1967 (aged 73) Brooklyn, New York, U.S.
- Resting place: Brooklyn, New York
- Education: St. Francis College (BA); Brooklyn Law School (LLB)
- Occupation: Lawyer; politician

Military service
- Branch/service: United States Army
- Battles/wars: World War I World War II

John James Bennett (March 2, 1894, Brooklyn, Kings County, New York – October 4, 1967, Brooklyn, Kings County, New York) was an American lawyer and politician.

== Life ==
Bennett was educated in Brooklyn's public and parochial schools. He was an alumnus of St. Francis College in Brooklyn Heights. Bennett enlisted in the U.S. Army and served in France during World War I as a member of the 77th Infantry Division's 308th Infantry Regiment. He also served as state commander of the American Legion.

In 1923 Bennett received a law degree from Brooklyn Law School and became an attorney in Brooklyn, also working as a professor at his alma mater.

He was New York State Attorney General from 1931 to 1942, elected in 1930, 1932, 1934, 1936 and 1938. He was a delegate to the New York State Constitutional Convention of 1938. He was a delegate to the 1940 Democratic National Convention. In 1942, he was the Democratic candidate for Governor of New York, but was defeated by Republican Thomas E. Dewey.

During World War II Bennett served in Europe with Supreme Headquarters Allied Expeditionary Force (SHAEF).

He also served as Deputy Mayor of New York City, Corporation Counsel of the City of New York, Chief Justice of the Court of Special Sessions, and Chairman of the New York City Planning Commission.

In 1961, Bennett was named associate professor of government at his alma mater, St. Francis College. At the time he was also a partner at the law firm of Barr, Bennett, and Fuller. Bennett died of a heart attack at his Brooklyn home.

He was buried at the Holy Cross Catholic Cemetery in Brooklyn.

== Sources ==
- Political Graveyard entry, John J. Bennett Jr.

Legal offices
Preceded by Hamilton Ward Jr.	New York State Attorney General; 1931–1942	Succeeded by Nathaniel L. Goldstein
Party political offices
Preceded by Albert Conway	Democratic nominee for Attorney General of New York; 1930, 1932, 1934, 1936, 1938	Succeeded by Henry Epstein
Preceded by Herbert H. Lehman	Democratic Nominee for Governor of New York; 1942	Succeeded by James M. Mead
