= Herbert H. Lehman =

American politician (1878–1963)

Herbert Lehman
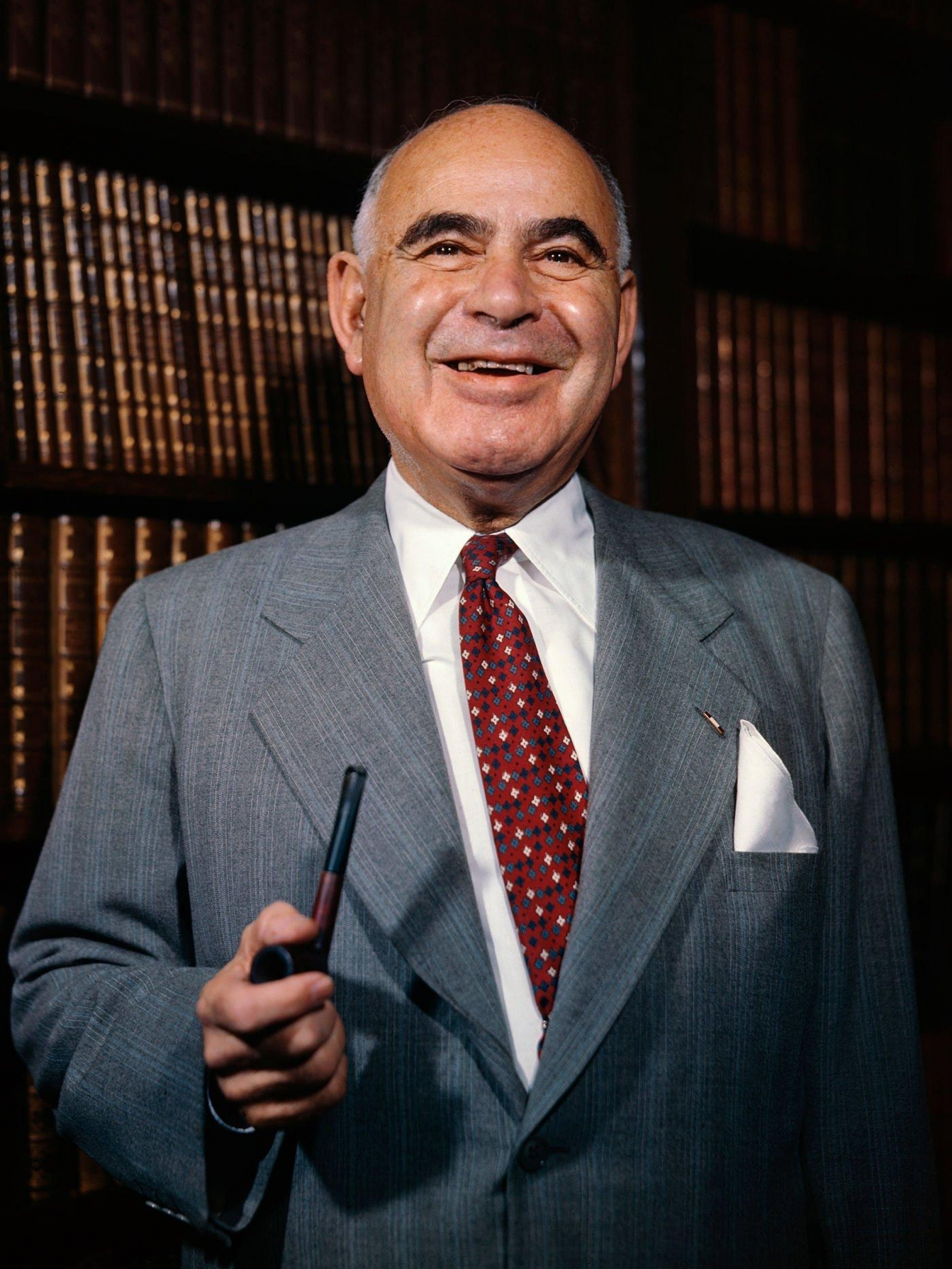
- Lehman in 1949

United States Senator from New York
- In office November 9, 1949 – January 3, 1957
- Preceded by: John Foster Dulles
- Succeeded by: Jacob K. Javits

1st Director General of the United Nations Relief and Rehabilitation Administration
- In office January 1, 1943 – March 31, 1946
- Preceded by: Position established
- Succeeded by: Fiorello H. LaGuardia

45th Governor of New York
- In office January 1, 1933 – December 3, 1942
- Lieutenant: M. William Bray; Charles Poletti
- Preceded by: Franklin D. Roosevelt
- Succeeded by: Charles Poletti

Lieutenant Governor of New York
- In office January 1, 1929 – December 31, 1932
- Governor: Franklin D. Roosevelt
- Preceded by: Edwin Corning
- Succeeded by: M. William Bray

Personal details
- Born: Herbert Henry Lehman; March 28, 1878 New York City, U.S.
- Died: December 5, 1963 (aged 85) New York City, U.S.
- Resting place: Kensico Cemetery
- Party: Democratic
- Spouse: Edith Altschul
- Children: 3
- Relatives: Mayer Lehman (father); See Lehman family
- Education: Williams College (BA)

Military service
- Allegiance: United States
- Branch/service: United States Army
- Years of service: 1917–1919
- Rank: Colonel
- Unit: United States Army Ordnance Corps
- Battles/wars: World War I
- Awards: Army Distinguished Service Medal

Herbert Henry Lehman (/ˈliːmən/ LEE-mən; March 28, 1878 – December 5, 1963) was an American financier and Democratic politician who served as the 45th governor of New York from 1933 to 1942 and represented New York in the United States Senate from 1949 until 1957.

== Early life and career ==
Lehman was born to a Reform Jewish family in Manhattan, New York City, the son of Babetta (née Newgass) and German-born immigrant Mayer Lehman, one of the three brothers (along with Henry and Emanuel Lehman) who co-founded the Lehman Brothers financial services firm. His brother was New York Court of Appeals judge Irving Lehman. His father arrived from Rimpar, Germany, in 1848, settling in Montgomery, Alabama, where he engaged in the slave-era cotton business. As cotton was the most important crop of the Southern United States and global demand led to profitable business, the Lehman brothers became cotton factors, accepting cotton bales from customers as payment for their merchandise. Cotton trading eventually became the main thrust of their business. In 1867, Mayer and Emanuel Lehman moved the company's headquarters to New York City, and helped found the New York Cotton Exchange.

Herbert Lehman attended The Sachs School, founded by Julius Sachs. In 1895, he graduated from Sachs Collegiate Institute in New York City, and in 1899, he graduated with a B.A. from Williams College. After college, Lehman worked in textile manufacturing, eventually becoming vice-president and treasurer of the J. Spencer Turner Company in Brooklyn. In 1908, he became a partner in Lehman Brothers with his brother Arthur and cousin Philip. By 1928, when he entered public service, he had withdrawn entirely from business.

== Military career ==
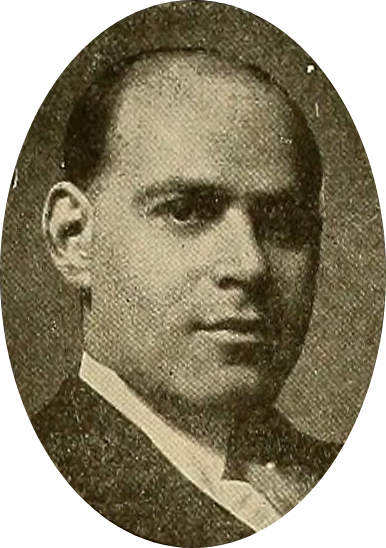
Captain Herbert H. Lehman, 1918

At the start of World War I, Lehman applied to attend a Citizens' Military Training Camp at Plattsburgh Barracks, New York. While his April 1917 application was pending, Lehman volunteered his services to the United States Navy as an expert on textiles the navy would need to acquire for uniforms and other wartime clothing and equipment. During this service, he worked closely with Franklin D. Roosevelt, then serving as Assistant Secretary of the Navy, which Roosevelt mentioned during campaign appearances when Roosevelt and Lehman were the Democratic nominees for governor and lieutenant governor in 1928.

In September 1917, Lehman was commissioned as a captain in the United States Army's Ordnance Corps. He was assigned as chief of the Ordnance Department's Equipment Section on the staff of the United States Department of War, and he was promoted to major in January 1918. Lehman subsequently served as chief of War Department's Methods Section, then chief of its Purchase Branch, and he was promoted to lieutenant colonel in October 1918.

After the end of the war in November 1918, Lehman took part in the army's demobilization as a member of the Board of Contract Adjustment, assistant director of the office of Purchase, Storage and Traffic, member of the War Department Claims Board, and chairman of the Board of Sales and Contract Termination. He was promoted to colonel in April 1919, and was discharged in June 1919. In July 1919, he was awarded the Army Distinguished Service Medal.

The President of the United States of America, authorized by Act of Congress, July 9, 1918, takes pleasure in presenting the Army Distinguished Service Medal to Colonel (General Staff) Herbert H. Lehman, United States Army, for exceptionally meritorious and distinguished services to the Government of the United States, in a duty of great responsibility during World War I. While with the Purchase, Storage, and Traffic Division of the General Staff as Chief of the Purchase Branch, member of the Board of Contract Adjustment, Chairman of the Advisory Board on Sales and Contract Termination, Member of the War Department Claims Board, and Assistant Director of Purchase, Storage, and Traffic, General Staff, Colonel Lehman's large business experience, breadth of vision, and sound judgment have been of inestimable value in formulating and in supervising the execution of the methods and policies followed in the cancellation of war contracts and obligations and in the settlement and adjustment of terminated obligations.
War Department, General Orders No. 103 (July 10, 1919)

== Early political career ==
Lehman became active in politics in 1920 and managed Governor Alfred E. Smith's successful reelection campaign in 1926. He became chairman of the finance committee of the Democratic Party in 1928. He was elected lieutenant governor of New York in 1928 and 1930 and resigned from Lehman Brothers upon taking office.

== Governor of New York ==
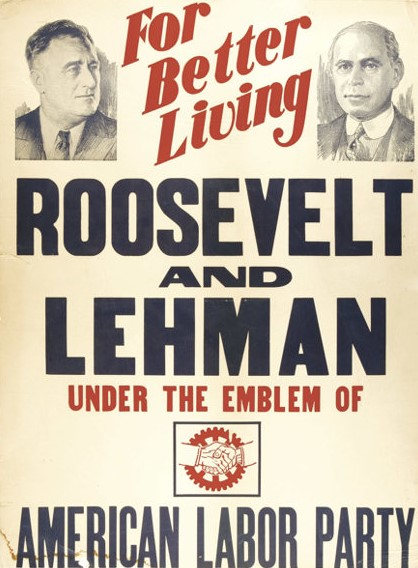
American Labor Party poster promoting Lehman and Roosevelt's campaigns in 1936

He then served four terms as Governor of New York, elected in 1932 to replace Franklin D. Roosevelt (who was elected president), and re-elected in 1934, 1936 and 1938 (when he was elected to New York's first four-year gubernatorial term). Unlike Smith, Lehman was a supporter of Roosevelt's New Deal and implemented a similar program in New York. Elements of this program included an unemployment insurance system, an improved workmen's compensation plan, minimum wage standards for women and children, and a "Little Wagner Act" to cover workers engaged in intrastate commerce. Under the original Wagner Act, workers engaged in intrastate commerce were not allowed to unionize. In 1934, Lehman refused to grant clemency to Anna Antonio, an Italian immigrant who was accused of hiring hitmen to kill her husband, who she claimed was abusive.

In October 1941, Lillian Hellman and Ernest Hemingway co-hosted a dinner to raise money for anti-Nazi activists imprisoned in France. Lehman agreed to participate, but withdrew because some of the sponsoring organizations, he wrote, "have long been connected with Communist activities." Hellman replied: "I do not and I did not ask the politics of any members of the committee and there is nobody who can with honesty vouch for anybody but themselves." She assured him the funds raised would be used as promised and later provided him with a detailed accounting. The next month she wrote him: "I am sure it will make you sad and ashamed as it did me to know that, of the seven resignations out of 147 sponsors, five were Jews. Of all the peoples in the world, I think, we should be the last to hold back help, on any grounds, from those who fought for us."

On December 3, 1942, Lehman resigned the governorship less than a month before the end of his term, to accept an appointment as director of the Office of Foreign Relief and Rehabilitation Operations for the U.S. Department of State. He served as director-general of the United Nations Relief and Rehabilitation Administration from 1943 to 1946.

== United States senator ==
Lehman was the Democratic nominee for U.S. senator from New York in 1946 and also ran on the Liberal and American Labor tickets but was defeated by the Republican candidate, Irving Ives.

In 1949, he ran again, this time in a special election to serve the remainder of Robert F. Wagner's term. In the campaign, he ran on the Democratic and Liberal tickets, with the American Labor Party urging their members not to vote for any candidate. Lehman defeated Republican John Foster Dulles, who had been appointed to temporarily fill the vacancy after Wagner's resignation, and took his seat on November 9, 1949.

On October 17, 1950, Lehman and New York State Supreme Court Judge Ferdinand Pecora gave radio addresses on behalf of the CIO-PAC during prime time (10:30-11:15 P.M.).

In 1950, Lehman was re-elected to a full term, running on the Democratic and Liberal lines and opposed by the American Labor Party.

Lehman was one of two U.S. senators who were opposed to nominating Mississippi senator James O. Eastland to be chairman of the Senate Judiciary Committee. (The other was Wayne Morse of Oregon.) He was also an early and vocal opponent of Senator Joseph McCarthy (R-Wis.). Lehman was one of the most liberal senators and was therefore not considered part of the Senate's "club" of insiders. He retired from the Senate after his full term and did not seek re-election in 1956.

== Retirement and death ==
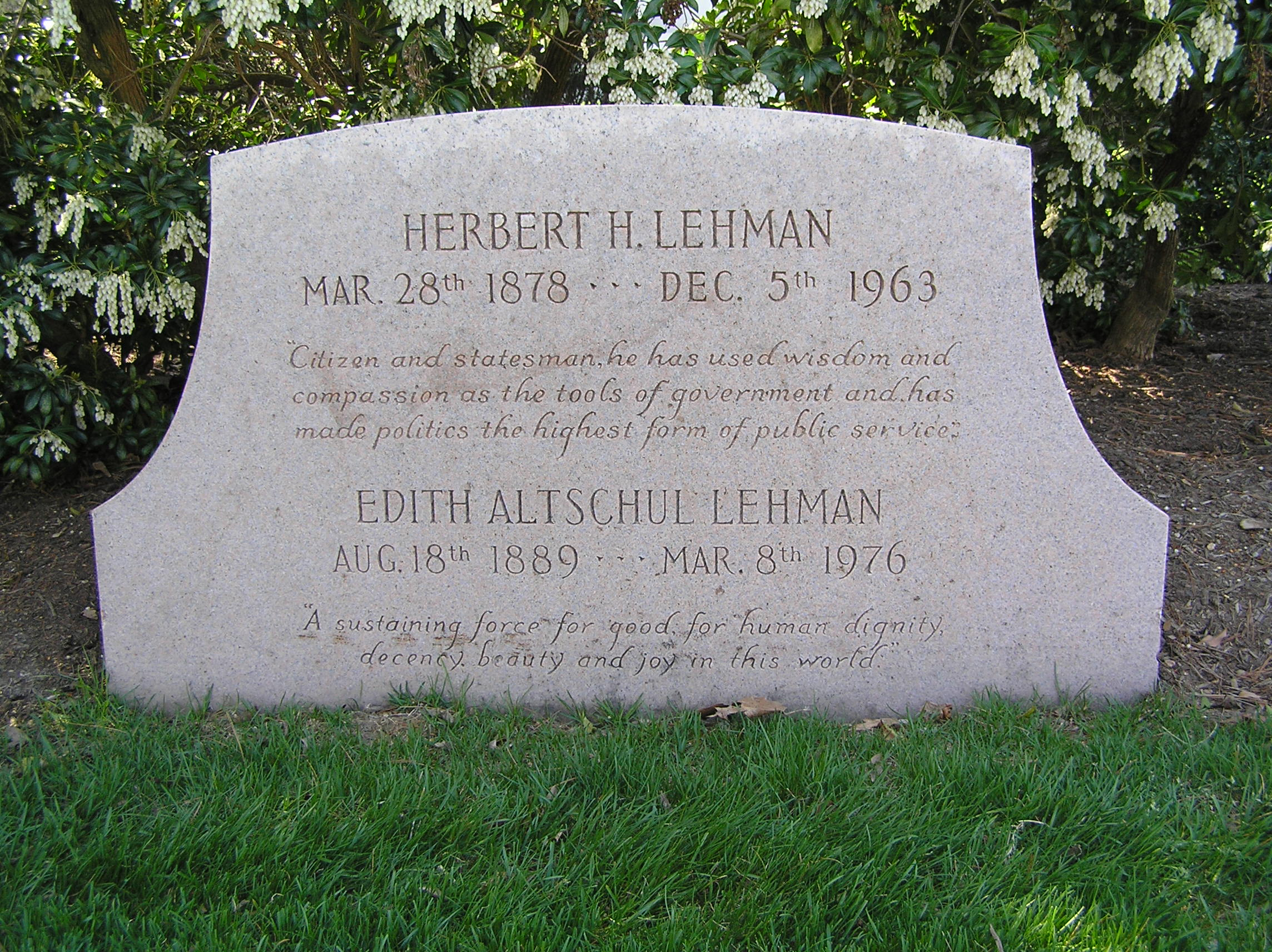
The gravesite of Herbert H. and Edith Altschul Lehman

After his retirement from the Senate, Lehman remained politically active, working with Eleanor Roosevelt and Thomas K. Finletter in the late 1950s and early 1960s to support the reform Democratic movement in Manhattan that eventually defeated longtime Tammany Hall boss Carmine DeSapio. He also helped to found the Lehman Children's Zoo (now the Tisch Zoo) in Central Park.

Lehman was the first, and until the 2007 inauguration of Eliot Spitzer, the only Jewish governor of New York. During much of his Senate career, he was the only Jewish senator as well. Unlike most of his Jewish constituents, who had immigrated to the US from eastern Europe, Lehman's family was from Germany.

Lehman spent much of the last two years of his life at his New York City home in increasingly poor health. He died of heart failure on December 5, 1963, at the age of 85. Lehman is interred at Kensico Cemetery in Valhalla, New York.

== Personal life ==
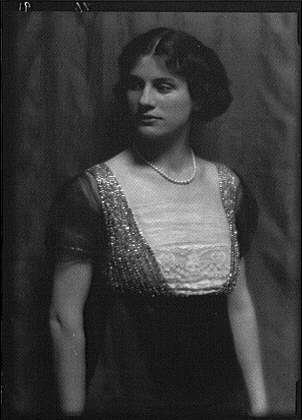
Lehman's wife Edith, 1912

On April 28, 1910, Lehman married Edith Louise Altschul (sister of banker Frank Altschul). The couple had three children: Hilda (1921), Peter (1917), and John. Hilda, Peter and John served in the United States military during World War II; Peter was killed while on active duty. According to a group history published April 6, 1944, the governor's son was to be awarded the Distinguished Flying Cross. The medal was set to be awarded to Peter on his father's 70th birthday. Peter married and had two daughters: Penny Lehman (1940) and Wendy Lehman (1942). His daughter Hilda married thrice. In 1940, Hilda married WPA actor Boris De Vadetzky, of French Russian descent; they later divorced. In 1945, she married U.S. Army major Eugene L. Paul; they later divorced. She married a third time which also ended in divorce. She had three children: Deborah Wise (1947), Peter Wise (1949) and Stephanie Wise (1951).

== Honors ==
- In 1957, he received the Solomon Bublick Award from the Hebrew University of Jerusalem.
- In 1963, he was awarded the Presidential Medal of Freedom. He died the day before the ceremony.
- Lehman College of the City University of New York is named after him; a bust of Lehman, by sculptor John Belardo, was dedicated there in September 2005. The High School of American Studies at Lehman College is located on the campus. College dormitories are named in his honor at Williams College, the University at Buffalo, SUNY Potsdam, and at Binghamton University.
- A ship on the Staten Island Ferry, The Governor Herbert H. Lehman, is named for him. She was retired in 2007 after forty-two years of service and has been sold for scrap.
- There is a Herbert H. Lehman Center for American History at Columbia University. Lehman's papers were donated to the Columbia University Libraries and are housed in the social sciences library – which is also named in his honor. In addition, Columbia has a Herbert Lehman Professorship of Government, whose current incumbent is Mahmood Mamdani. Columbia's sister school, Barnard College, formerly had a building named in honor of Adele Lewisohn Lehman, Herbert Lehman's sister-in-law, which housed the Wollman Library. Barnard also has a "Lehman Auditorium" in Altschul Hall. Williams College, Lehman's alma mater, named a dormitory after him in 1928.
- Lehman High School (established 1974) on Westchester Square in The Bronx, New York, is named in his honor.
- In 1974, Lehman was inducted into the Jewish-American Hall of Fame.
- Liman, Israel, in northern Israel is named after him.
- A passage from testimony by Lehman for a United States House of Representatives subcommittee in 1947, "It is immigrants who brought this land the skills of their hands and brains, to make of it a beacon of opportunity and hope for all men," has been inscribed in his honor on several versions of US passport since 2004.

== See also ==
- List of Jewish members of the United States Congress

Political offices
Preceded by Edwin Corning	Lieutenant Governor of New York; 1929–1932	Succeeded by M. William Bray
Preceded by Franklin D. Roosevelt	Governor of New York; 1933–1942	Succeeded by Charles Poletti
Party political offices
Preceded by Edwin Corning	Democratic nominee for Lieutenant Governor of New York; 1928, 1930	Succeeded by M. William Bray
Preceded by Franklin D. Roosevelt	Democratic nominee for Governor of New York; 1932, 1934, 1936, 1938	Succeeded by John J. Bennett Jr.
Preceded by James M. Mead	Democratic nominee for U.S. Senator from New York (Class 1); 1946	Succeeded by John Cashmore
New political party	Liberal nominee for U.S. Senator from New York (Class 1); 1946	Succeeded by Frank Hogan
Preceded by Robert F. Wagner	Democratic nominee for U.S. Senator from New York (Class 3); 1949, 1950	Succeeded by Robert F. Wagner Jr.
Non-profit organization positions
New office	Director General of the United Nations Relief and Rehabilitation Administration; 1943–1946	Succeeded by Fiorello H. LaGuardia
U.S. Senate
Preceded by John Foster Dulles	U.S. Senator (Class 3) from New York; 1949–1957; Served alongside: Irving Ives	Succeeded by Jacob K. Javits
