= 1942 New York gubernatorial election =

- November 3, 1942
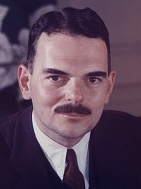

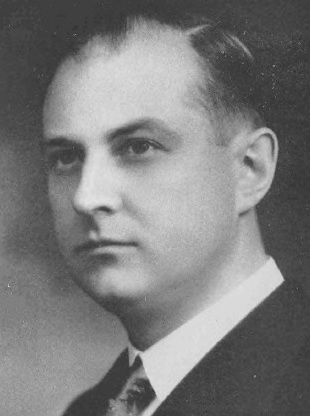

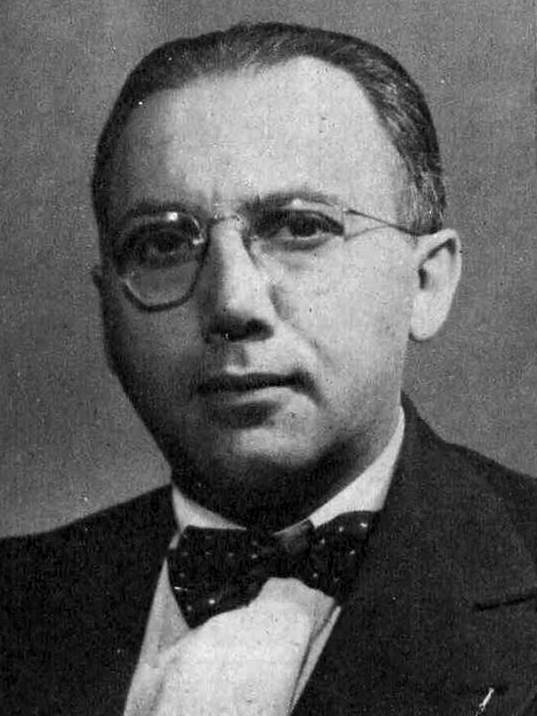
Nominee	Thomas E. Dewey	John J. Bennett Jr.	Dean Alfange
Party	Republican	Democratic	American Labor
Popular vote	2,148,546	1,501,039	403,626
Percentage	52.10%	36.40%	9.79%
- County results Dewey: 40–50% 50–60% 60–70% 70–80% 80–90% Bennett: 30–40% 40–50% 50–60%
Governor before election
Herbert H. Lehman
Democratic
Elected Governor
Thomas E. Dewey
Republican

The 1942 New York gubernatorial election was held on November 3, 1942, to elect the Governor of New York. Incumbent Democratic governor Herbert H. Lehman was not a candidate for re-election. Republican Thomas E. Dewey defeated New York Attorney General John J. Bennett Jr. and Dean Alfange in the general election.

== Democratic nomination ==
=== Candidates ===
- John J. Bennett Jr., New York Attorney General since 1931
- James M. Mead, incumbent U.S. Senator since 1938

=== Results ===
The Democratic state convention met on August 20 at the Hotel St. George in Brooklyn. Influenced by James A. Farley, the convention nominated State Attorney General John J. Bennett Jr., for governor on the first ballot with 623 votes against 393 for U.S. Senator James M. Mead, the candidate favored by President Franklin D. Roosevelt.

1942 Democratic state convention
Party	Candidate	Votes	%
Democratic	John J. Bennett Jr.	623	61.32%
Democratic	James M. Mead	393	38.68%
Total votes		1,016	100.00%

== American Labor nomination ==
=== Candidates ===
- Dean Alfange, chair of the American Labor Party and nominee for U.S. Representative in 1941

=== Results ===
At the American Labor state convention on August 22, the party declined to nominate Bennett or Mead, and instead nominated Dean Alfange.

== Republican nomination ==
=== Candidates ===
- Thomas E. Dewey, former District Attorney of New York County, U.S. Attorney for the Southern District of New York, and nominee for governor in 1938

=== Results ===
At the Republican state convention in Saratoga Springs on August 24, Dewey was nominated unanimously.

== General election ==
=== Candidates ===
- Israel Amter, perennial candidate (Communist)
- John J. Bennett Jr., New York Attorney General since 1931 (Democratic)
- Coleman Cheney, Skidmore College professor of economics (Socialist)
- Thomas E. Dewey, former District Attorney of New York County, U.S. Attorney for the Southern District of New York, and nominee for governor in 1938 (Republican)
- Aaron Orange, Bronx public school teacher and perennial candidate (Industrial Government)

=== Results ===
1942 New York gubernatorial election
Party	Candidate	Votes	%	±%
Republican	Thomas E. Dewey	2,148,546	52.10%	
Democratic	John J. Bennett Jr.	1,501,039	36.40%	
American Labor	Dean Alfange	403,626	9.79%	
Communist	Israel Amter	45,220	1.10%	
Socialist	Coleman B. Cheney	21,911	0.53%	
Industrial Government	Aaron Orange	3,496	0.08%	
Total votes		4,123,838	100.00%	

== See also ==
- 1942 New York state election
- New York gubernatorial elections
