= Reason Foundation =

American libertarian think tank

Coordinates: 33.9842°N 118.3995°W

- Founders: Robert W. Poole Jr., Manuel S. Klausner, Tibor Machan
- Established: 1978; 48 years ago
- Mission: Advancing a free society by developing, applying, and promoting libertarian principles, including individual liberty, free markets, and the rule of law
- Focus: Public policy
- President: David Nott
- Chair: Gerry Ohrstrom
- Staff: 100(2024)
- Key people: Drew Carey, Nick Gillespie, Matt Welch
- Budget: Revenue: $22.8 million Expenses: $22 million (FYE September 2025)
- Subsidiaries: reason.com reason TV
- Slogan: "free minds and free markets"
- Location: Los Angeles, California, U.S. Washington, D.C., U.S.
- Website: reason.org

The Reason Foundation is an American libertarian think tank that was founded in 1978. The foundation publishes the magazine Reason. Based in Los Angeles, California, it is a nonprofit, tax-exempt organization. According to its website, the foundation is committed to advancing "the values of individual freedom and choice, limited government, and market-friendly policies." In the 2014 Global Go To Think Tank Index Report (Think Tanks and Civil Societies Program, University of Pennsylvania), the foundation was number 41 (of 60) in the "Top Think Tanks in the United States".

Reason Foundation's policy research areas include: air traffic control, American domestic monetary policy, school choice, eminent domain, government reform, housing, land use, immigration, privatization, public–private partnerships, urban traffic and congestion, transportation, industrial hemp, medical marijuana, police raids and militarization, free trade, globalization, and telecommunications. Affiliated projects include Drew Carey's Reason TV video website. Reason Foundation staff also regularly contribute to the Out of Control Policy Blog.

Reason Foundation cofounder Robert Poole is an MIT-trained engineer and the author of Cutting Back City Hall. The book provided the intellectual support for Margaret Thatcher's privatization efforts in the United Kingdom during the 1980s. Poole remains at Reason serving as an officer on the organization's board of trustees and director of transportation. In 1970 he, along with Manny Klausner and Tibor Machan, purchased Reason magazine, which had been founded in 1968 by Lanny Friedlander.

== Background ==
Robert Poole founded Reason Foundation and served as its president from 1978 to 2001. Patricia Lynn Scarlett took over as president in 2001, but soon resigned to join the George W. Bush administration as assistant secretary for policy, management, and budget at the Department of the Interior. David Nott, a Stanford University graduate, has served as Reason Foundation's president since 2001.

The foundation is an associate member of the State Policy Network, a U.S. national network of free-market-oriented think tanks.

=== Funding and partners ===
As a 501(c)(3) nonprofit organization, Reason Foundation is supported by donations and sale of its publications.

In 2020, the independent rating group Charity Navigator rated Reason with four out of four stars. As of 2024, the foundation's Charity Navigator score is 97 percent.

== Publications ==
=== Annual Privatization Report, Privatization Watch, and Innovators in Action ===
Reason Foundation publishes the Annual Privatization Report, which reports on news and trends in U.S. outsourcing, privatization, and public-private partnerships. Privatization Watch is another of the Foundation's privatization publications published quarterly. Innovators in Action is an annual publication that advocates shrinking the size and scope of government, usually through privatization. Former New York City Mayor Rudy Giuliani, former Florida Gov. Jeb Bush, former Colorado Gov. Bill Owens wrote columns for this publication in 2007.

=== Annual Highway Report ===
Reason Foundation's Annual Highway Report ranks each state's transportation system on cost-effectiveness and efficiency. In 2021, the report ranked North Dakota, Virginia, Missouri, Kentucky, and North Carolina as having the most cost-effective highway systems, with New Jersey, Rhode Island, Alaska, Hawaii, and New York having "the worst combination of highway performance and cost-effectiveness."

=== Reason magazine ===
Reason Foundation's primary publication is the magazine, Reason, which was first published in 1968 by Lanny Friedlander, and was originally an infrequently published mimeographed magazine. In 1970, Robert Poole purchased Reason with Manuel S. Klausner and Tibor R. Machan, who set the magazine on a more regular publication schedule. The magazine covers politics, culture, and ideas through a mix of news, analysis, commentary, and reviews. It also conducts podcast interviews.

Reason and Reason Online are editorially independent publications of the foundation. Reason magazine won three Los Angeles Press Club awards in 2008. In May 2025, Reason was nominated for 17 Southern California Journalism Awards by the Los Angeles Press Club.

== Policy areas ==
=== Privatization ===
Reason Foundation co-founder Robert Poole "is credited as the first person to use the term 'privatization' to refer to the contracting-out of public services and is the author of the first-ever book on municipal privatization, Cutting Back City Hall, published by Universe Books in 1980." The book was very influential, notably, by providing the intellectual support for Margaret Thatcher's privatization efforts in the United Kingdom. Thatcher wrote in the foundation's Annual Privatization Report 2006, "State control is fundamentally bad because it denies people the power to choose and the opportunity to bear responsibility for their own actions. Conversely, privatisation shrinks the power of the state and free enterprise enlarges the power of the people."

The Reason Foundation supports the privatization of (or public-private partnerships for) almost all government functions. Leonard Gilroy, Reason Foundation's director of government reform, describes privatization as "a strategy to lower the costs of government and achieve higher performance and better outcomes for tax dollars spent." Gilroy also notes that "If badly executed, privatization like any other policy can fail. Taxpayers are no better off, and may be worse off, if a service is moved from a government agency to an incompetent or inefficient private business."

=== Education ===
Reason Foundation advocates for education reform through expanded school choice initiatives. Reason's director of education and child welfare, Lisa Snell, authored a study in 2009 entitled Weighted Student Formula Yearbook 2009, which examined school districts using student-based "backpack funding." Snell is also: "an advisory board member to the National Quality Improvement Center for the Children's Bureau; on the charter school accreditation team for the American Academy for Liberal Education; and serves as a board member for the California Virtual Academy."

=== Municipal broadband ===
In 2006, Reason Foundation issued a report criticizing a municipal Wi-Fi project iProvo in Provo, Utah as financially unstable and ineffective at lowering Internet costs or raising broadband use. iProvo proponents responded vigorously with a white paper rebutting Reason's conclusions.

In 2008, Reason issued a follow-up report entitled, iProvo Revisited: Another Year and Still Struggling. According to Reason, the predictions in its first report had proven true: "iProvo's total losses are likely to exceed $10 million by the end of this fiscal year – and that figure doesn't include the $39.5 million borrowed to launch the project, most of which still needs to be paid back." Reason called for the city to "cut its losses" and sell the network to a private company. Shortly after the 2008 report was issued, the mayor of Provo, Lewis Billings, who had been highly critical of the Reason reports, announced that iProvo would in fact be sold to a private enterprise, Broadweave, for $40 million.

=== Climate change ===
In 2005, Reason magazine's science writer Ronald Bailey wrote a column declaring that climate change is both real and anthropogenic. He wrote, "Anyone still holding onto the idea that there is no global warming ought to hang it up. All data sets – satellite, surface, and balloon – have been pointing to rising global temperatures."

In 2006, Bailey wrote an article entitled "Confessions of an Alleged ExxonMobil Whore: Actually no one paid me to be wrong about global warming. Or anything else." In the article Bailey explains how increasing public rebuff changed his mind on climate change.

According to DeSmog, Reason is skeptical of the negative impact of climate change.

=== War in Iraq ===
The Reason Foundation was critical of the cost of the war in Iraq. Reason magazine's May 2008 cover story, "Trillion Dollar War", discussed what it viewed as the dubious ways in which the war in Iraq and Afghanistan have been funded by Congress, the military–industrial complex, and the Bush administration.

=== Healthcare ===
On August 25, 2010, ReasonTV published a video entitled, "Wheat, Weed and Obamacare: How the Commerce Clause Made Congress All-Powerful", as part of an effort to question the constitutionality of the Patient Protection and Affordable Care Act (PPACA), also known as Obamacare. The video has been credited with popularizing the argument in conservative circles that PPACA's individual mandate to buy health insurance is constitutionally equivalent to requiring consumers to buy particular types of fruits or vegetables. This argument was ultimately articulated by Justice Antonin Scalia, who suggested during oral argument of the PPACA cases that if Congress has the power to require Americans to buy health insurance, then "Therefore, you can make people buy broccoli."

== Bastiat Prize ==
Reason Foundation issued an annual Bastiat Prize (named after Frédéric Bastiat) to recognize writing that "best demonstrates the importance of freedom with originality, wit and eloquence". Awardees include Bari Weiss, Radley Balko, Daniel Hannan, Robert Graboyes, Ross Clark, Virginia Postrel, Tom Easton, Bret Stephens, Amit Varma, Jamie Whyte, Tim Harford, Robert Guest, Brian Carney, and Amity Shlaes.

== Drew Carey Project and Reason TV ==
Comedian and The Price Is Right host Drew Carey serves on the board of trustees at Reason Foundation. According to an interview by Katherine Herrup of The New York Sun with Nick Gillespie (current editor-in-chief of Reason TV), Carey initially proposed the idea for Reason TV after reading Reason magazine for years. He then both appeared in and narrated many videos produced by Reason TV.

One of the collaboration's first projects, Carey's video criticizing the Drug Enforcement Administration's medical marijuana raids, received significant national attention, Some of his other videos for the foundation have promoted free trade; criticized the government's raids of local poker games and an Arizona attempt to ban dancing in a family restaurant (Footloose in Arizona); highlighted a ban on bacon-wrapped hot dogs in Los Angeles; detailed abuse of eminent domain laws; called for more toll roads to relieve congestion; argued for deregulation of organ donation (including kidneys and other organs); and called for immigration reform.

Reason TV produced a full-length documentary entitled Reason Saves Cleveland with Drew Carey applying success stories from around the United States to "save Cleveland." The documentary was awarded "Best Advocacy Journalism" at the 53rd Annual Southern California Journalism Awards by the Los Angeles Press Club.

== Oath of Presidential Transparency ==
Reason Foundation and a bipartisan group of more than thirty other organizations asked all of the 2008 U.S. presidential candidates to sign a pledge promising that, if elected, they would deliver the most transparent presidency in history and guaranteeing the executive branch would adhere to the concepts of open government. The candidates who signed the oath were: Sen. Barack Obama (D–Illinois), Rep. Ron Paul (R–Texas), Sen. Sam Brownback (R–Kansas), former Sen. Mike Gravel (D–Alaska), Rep. Dennis Kucinich (D–Ohio), Libertarian candidate Bob Barr, and John Cox.

Reason Foundation's vice president of research Adrian Moore said of the oath, "The next president should be committed to transparency and accountability. Redesigning the federal government, so that it is more accountable to taxpayers and businesses, is a nonpartisan issue. Transparency will help produce a government focused on results instead of our current system, which is plagued by secrecy, wasteful spending and pork projects."

Then-Senator Barack Obama echoed those sentiments saying, "Every American has the right to know how the government spends their tax dollars, but for too long that information has been largely hidden from public view. This historic law will lift the veil of secrecy in Washington and ensure that our government is transparent and accountable to the American people."
