= Alexander Kahn =

American lawyer

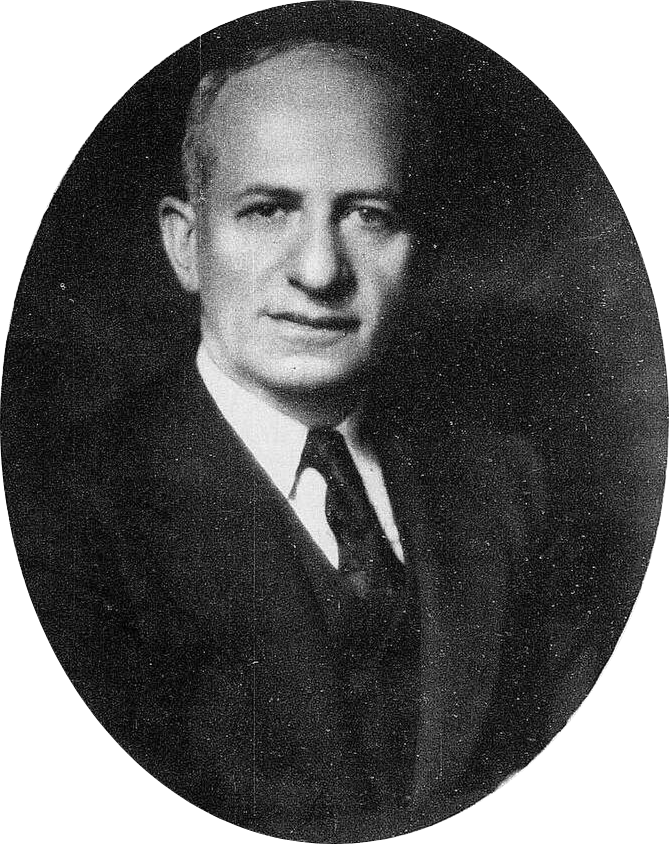
- Kahn c. 1939
- Born: May 31, 1881; Smolensk, Smolensk Governorate, Russian Empire
- Died: March 11, 1962 (aged 80); New York City, New York, U.S.
- Education: New York University School of Law (LL.B.)
- Political party: Socialist (before 1936); American Labor (1936–1944); Liberal (after 1944)
- Spouse: Sarah Rosenbaum (m. 1909; died 1962)
- Children: 3

Alexander Kahn (May 31, 1881 – March 11, 1962) was an American lawyer and newspaper publisher who was general manager of The Jewish Daily Forward from 1939 to 1962.

== Early life and education ==
Kahn was born on May 31, 1881, in Smolensk, Russian Empire, the son of Solomon and B. Lena Ben Zionoff. He immigrated to America in 1893.

In 1903, Kahn graduated from New York University School of Law (NYU Law) with an LL.B. and was admitted to the bar.

== Career ==
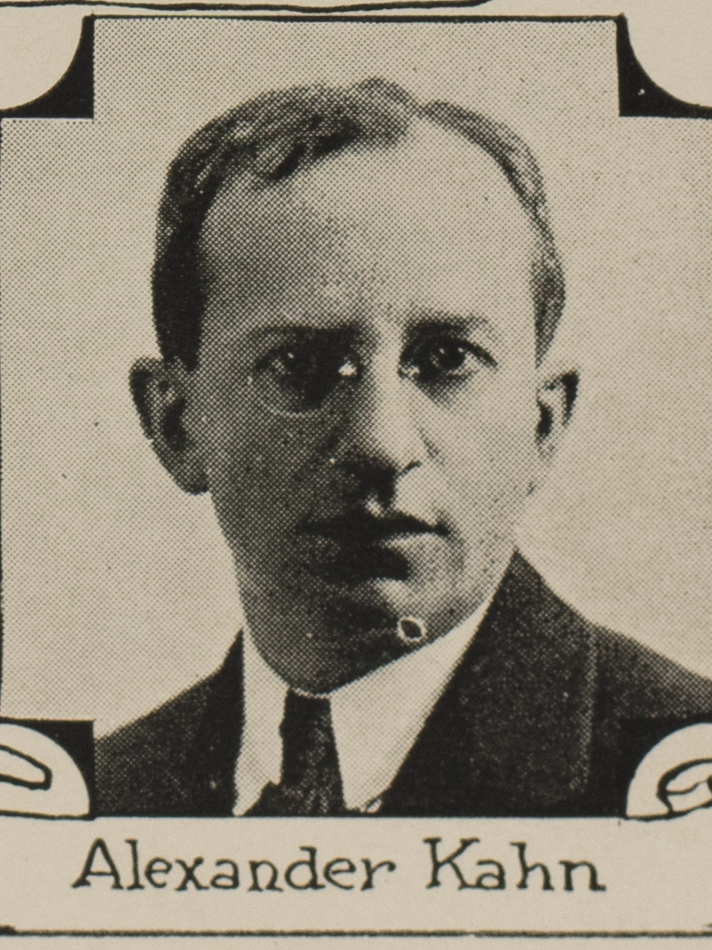
Kahn c. 1922

From 1903 to 1905, he was an assistant to a faculty member at NYU Law. He began practicing law in 1905.

From 1916 to 1918, Kahn was chairman of the People's Relief Committee, which raised $7 million for war sufferers. In 1919, he became a member of the executive board of the Hebrew Sheltering and Immigrant Aid Society of America. In 1929, he was appointed a non-Zionist representative of the administration committee of the American representative of the Jewish Agency for Palestine. He was also a vice-chairman of the American Jewish Joint Distribution Committee and a director of the American Jewish Joint Agricultural Corporation and the American Society for Jewish Farm Settlements in Russia. Kahn was also a director of the Workmen's Circle and a corporation officer of the WEVD radio station.

Kahn was active in the Socialist Party and the trade union movement as a worker and speaker since 1897. In 1922, Kahn was a Socialist Party candidate for Justice of the New York Supreme Court. In 1931, he was the Socialist candidate for Brooklyn District Attorney, losing to Democrat William F. X. Geoghan. In the 1932 United States House of Representatives election Kahn was the Socialist candidate in New York's 17th congressional district. He lost the election to Democrat Theodore A. Peyser. In the 1934 United States House of Representatives election, he was the Socialist candidate in New York's 7th congressional district. He lost the election to John J. Delaney.

In the 1942 New York state election, Kahn was the American Labor Party's candidate for Attorney General of New York. He lost the election to Republican Nathaniel L. Goldstein. Kahn was a founder and vice-president of the Liberal Party of New York, and unsuccessfully ran for office through that party.

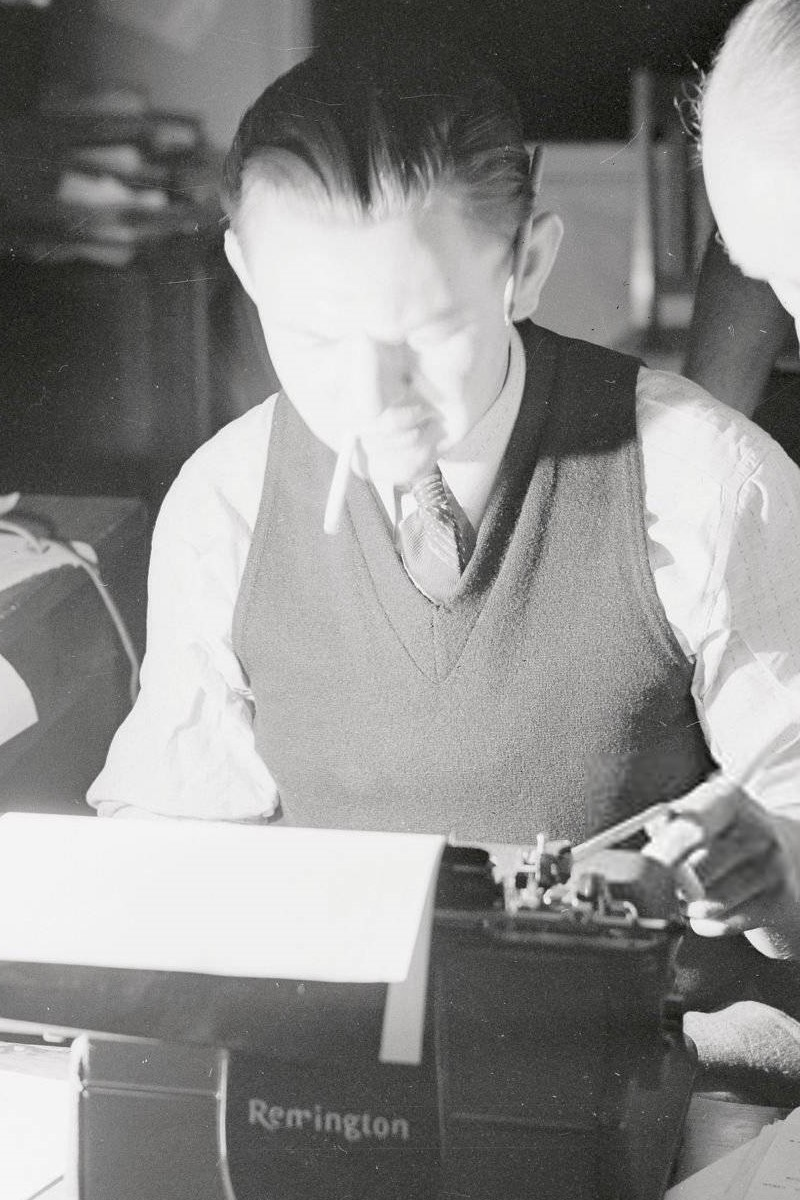
Kahn at his desk, 1941

In 1923, Kahn became a director of the Rand School of Social Science and chairman of the New Leader Association (which published The New Leader). In 1924, he joined the executive committee of the Conference for Progressive Political Action.

Kahn wrote articles for the Jewish Daily Forward and the Jewish Worker. He was known as "the East Side Ambassador to the Uptown Jews" due to his contributions in bringing the perspectives of Jewish immigrants to American Jewish leaders who knew little about their views. In 1914, he became vice-president of the Forward Association, which published the Forward. He was also general counsel of the Forward Association since 1903. In 1939, he became general manager of the Forward. He retired as general manager a few weeks before his death.

== Personal life ==
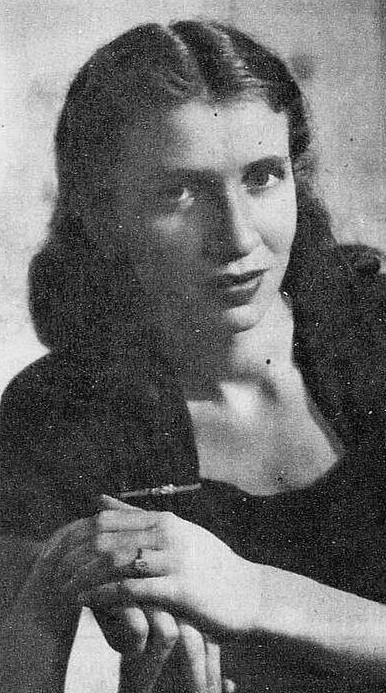
Kahn's youngest daughter Jeanne c. 1946

In 1909, Kahn married Sarah Rosenbaum. Their children were Nora, Robert, and Jeanne. Sarah taught at the Educational Alliance on the Lower East Side and was chairman of the Women's division of the Rand School and president of the New York Council of Pioneer Women of the Women's Labor Zionist Organization of America. She died five months after Kahn.

Deeply interested in Labor Zionism, he visited Israel with his wife shortly after the country's founding and was honored by Histadrut. He was a personal friend of Yitzhak Ben-Zvi and David Ben-Gurion. In 1961, the Israeli government presented him with a silver-bound Bible for his work on behalf of the Israel Bond Organization in America.

== Death ==
Kahn died in New York Hospital on March 11, 1962. He was eulogized at his funeral by many prominent New Yorkers, including Mayor Robert F. Wagner, Jewish Labor Committee chairman Adolph Held, New York Supreme Court Justice Matthew M. Levy, Federal Judge Paul R. Hays, the Forward's acting editor Dr. Lazar Fogelman, Joint Distribution Committee executive vice-chairman Moses A. Leavitt, Israel Bond Organization executive vice-president Dr. Joseph J. Schwartz, Workmen's Circle leader Nathan Chanin, and Liberal Party president Alexander Rose.

Kahn was buried in the Workmen's Circle section of Mount Carmel Cemetery in Queens, New York.
