= Ross Clark =

Ross Clark may refer to:

- Ross Clark (poet), Australian poet
- Ross Clark (journalist), British journalist and author
- Ross Clark (footballer), Scottish footballer
- Rylan Clark, born Ross Clark, English television and radio presenter
- Ross Clark Circle
