= The Forward =

Jewish American news media organization

- Home page of The Forward on April 7, 2025
- Owner: Forward Association
- Publisher: Rachel Fishman Feddersen
- Editor-in-chief: Julie Moos
- Associate editor: Adam Langer
- Staff writers: Benyamin Cohen, Hannah Feuer, Mira Fox, PJ Grisar, Beth Harpaz, Louis Keene, Jacob Kornbluh, Arno Rosenfeld
- Founded: April 22, 1897; 129 years ago
- Political alignment: Progressive
- Language: English and Yiddish
- Headquarters: New York City
- Circulation: English: 28,221 (as of March 2013)
- ISSN: 1051-340X
- OCLC number: 34407272
- Website: forward.com

The Forward (Yiddish: פֿאָרווערטס, romanized: Forṿerṭs), formerly known as The Jewish Daily Forward, is an American news outlet that focuses on issues of interest to Jewish American readers. It was founded in 1897 as a Yiddish-language daily socialist newspaper. The New York Times reported that Seth Lipsky "started an English-language offshoot of the Yiddish-language newspaper" as a weekly newspaper in 1990.

In the 21st century, The Forward became a digital-only publication. In 2016, the publication of the Yiddish version changed its print format from a biweekly newspaper to a monthly magazine; the English weekly paper followed suit in 2017. Those magazines were published until 2019.

The Yiddish Forward (Forverts) is a clearinghouse for the latest developments in the Yiddish world with almost daily news reports related to Yiddish language and culture as well as videos of cooking demonstrations, Yiddish humor and new songs. A Yiddish rendition of the Leonard Cohen song "Hallelujah", translated and performed by klezmer musician Daniel Kahn, garnered over a million views.

On January 17, 2019, the publication announced it would discontinue its print edition and only publish its English and Yiddish editions online. Layoffs of its editor-in-chief and 20% of its editorial staff were also announced.

Jodi Rudoren was named editor in July 2019, and took charge in September 2019 and resigned in April 2025.

Alyssa Katz took over as editor in January 2026 but lasted only nine months before she "mutually agreed" to leave. Katz was replaced by Julie Moos, who previously served as interim Editor in Chief and Vice President for Audience & Strategy.

== History ==
=== Founding ===
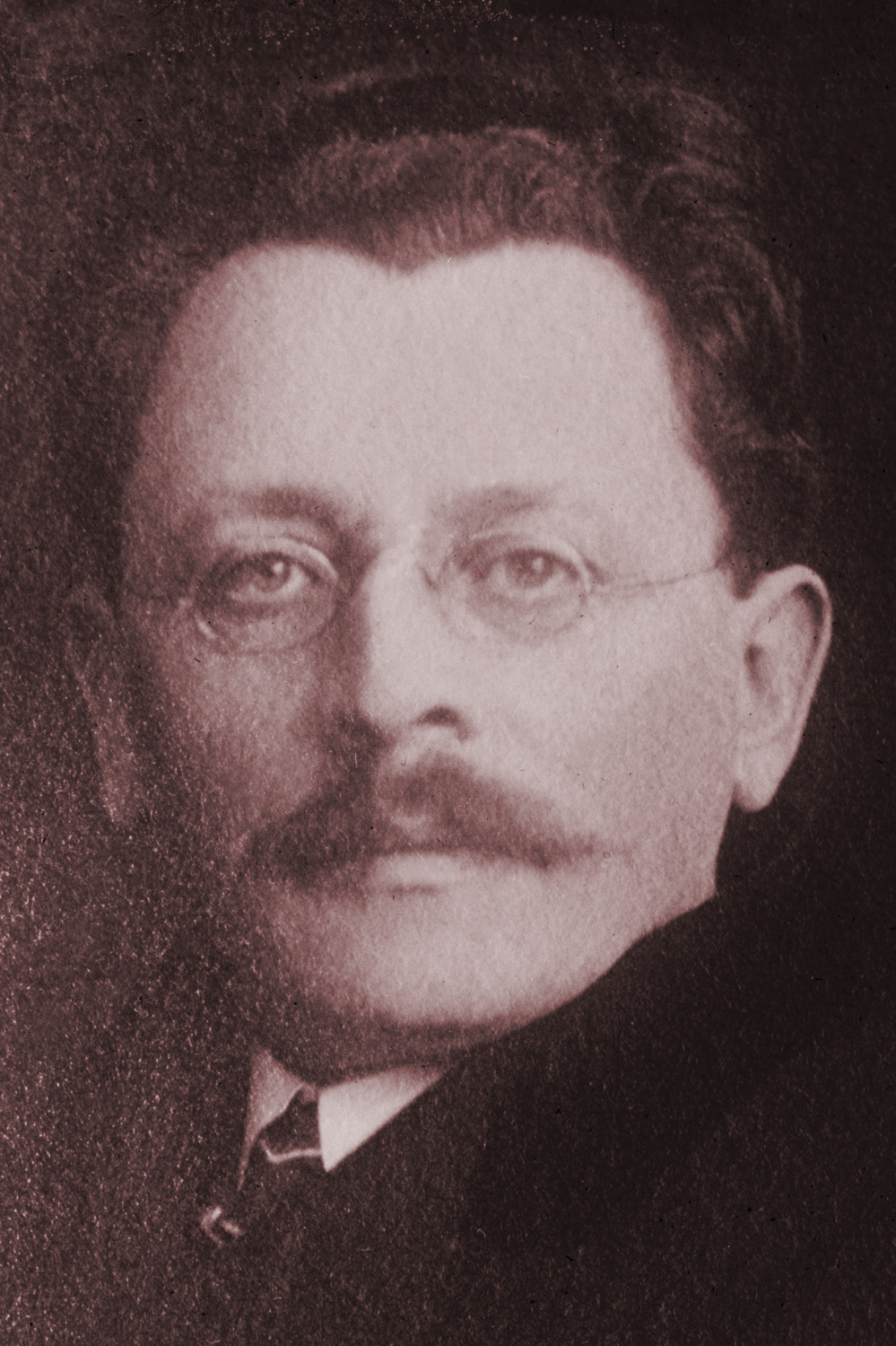
Abraham Cahan, patriarch of The Forward until 1946

The first issue of Forverts appeared on April 22, 1897, in New York City. The paper was founded by a group of about 50 Yiddish-speaking socialists who had organized three months earlier as the Forward Publishing Association. The paper's name, as well as its political orientation, was borrowed from the German Social Democratic Party and its organ Vorwärts.

Forverts was a successor to New York's first Yiddish-language socialist newspaper, Di Arbeter Tsaytung (The Workman's Paper), a weekly established in 1890 by the fledgling Jewish trade union movement centered in the United Hebrew Trades, as a vehicle for bringing socialist and trade unionist ideas to Yiddish-speaking immigrants, primarily from eastern Europe. This paper had been merged into a new Yiddish daily called Dos Abend Blatt (The Evening Paper) as its weekend supplement when that publication was launched in 1894 under the auspices of the Socialist Labor Party (SLP). As this publication established itself, it came under increased political pressure from the de facto head of the SLP, Daniel De Leon, who attempted to maintain a rigid ideological line with respect to its content. It was this centralizing political pressure which had been the motivating factor for a new publication.

Chief among the dissident socialists of the Forward Publishing Association were Louis Miller and Abraham Cahan. These two founding fathers of The Forward were quick to enlist in the ranks of a new rival socialist political party, the Social Democratic Party of America, founded in 1897 by Eugene V. Debs, the nationally famous leader of the 1894 American Railway Union strike, and Victor L. Berger, a German-speaking Jewish teacher and newspaper publisher from Milwaukee. Both joined the SDP in July 1897.

The Forward was notably the only socialist newspaper/group that supported the Spanish-American war. The Forward organized a May Day, 1898 parade, calling on Jewish workers to support the war. This parade was allowed by the authorities, while the antiwar parade organized by the Socialist Labor party was not.

=== Early years ===
Despite this political similarity, Miller and Cahan differed as to the political orientation of the paper and Cahan left after just four months to join the staff of The Commercial Advertiser, a well-established Republican newspaper also based in New York City.

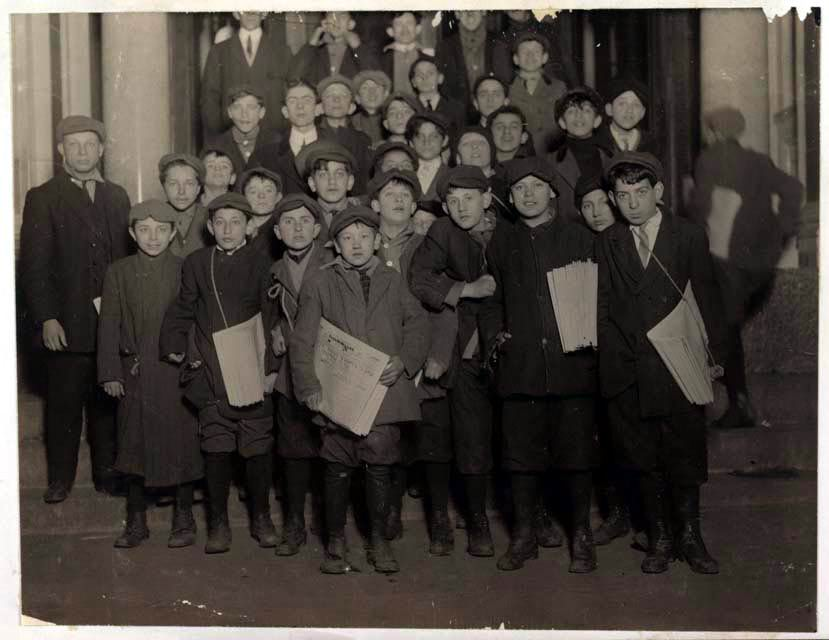
Newsboys for the Forward wait for their copies in the early morning hours in March 1913.

For the next four years, until 1901, Cahan remained outside of The Forward office, learning the newspaper trade in a financially successful setting. He only returned, he later recalled in his memoir, upon the promise of "absolute full power" over the editorial desk.

The circulation of the paper, which was described as "one of the first national newspapers," grew quickly, paralleling the rapid growth of the Yiddish speaking population of the United States. By 1912 its circulation was 120,000, and by the late 1920s/early 1930s, The Forward was a leading U.S. metropolitan daily with considerable influence and a nationwide circulation of more than 275,000 though this had dropped to 170,000 by 1939 as a result of changes in U.S. immigration policy that restricted the immigration of Jews to a trickle.

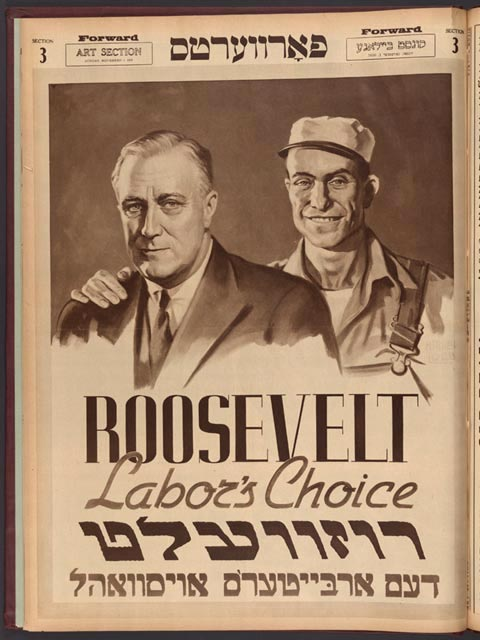
This November 1, 1936, magazine section of The Forward illustrates its evolution from a Democratic Socialist publication to a Social Democratic supporter of Franklin D. Roosevelt's "New Deal".

Early on, The Forward defended trade unionism and moderate, democratic socialism. The paper was a significant participant in the activities of the International Ladies' Garment Workers' Union; Benjamin Schlesinger, a former president of the ILGWU, became the general manager of the paper in 1923, then returned to the presidency of the union in 1928. The paper was also an early supporter of David Dubinsky, Schlesinger's eventual successor.

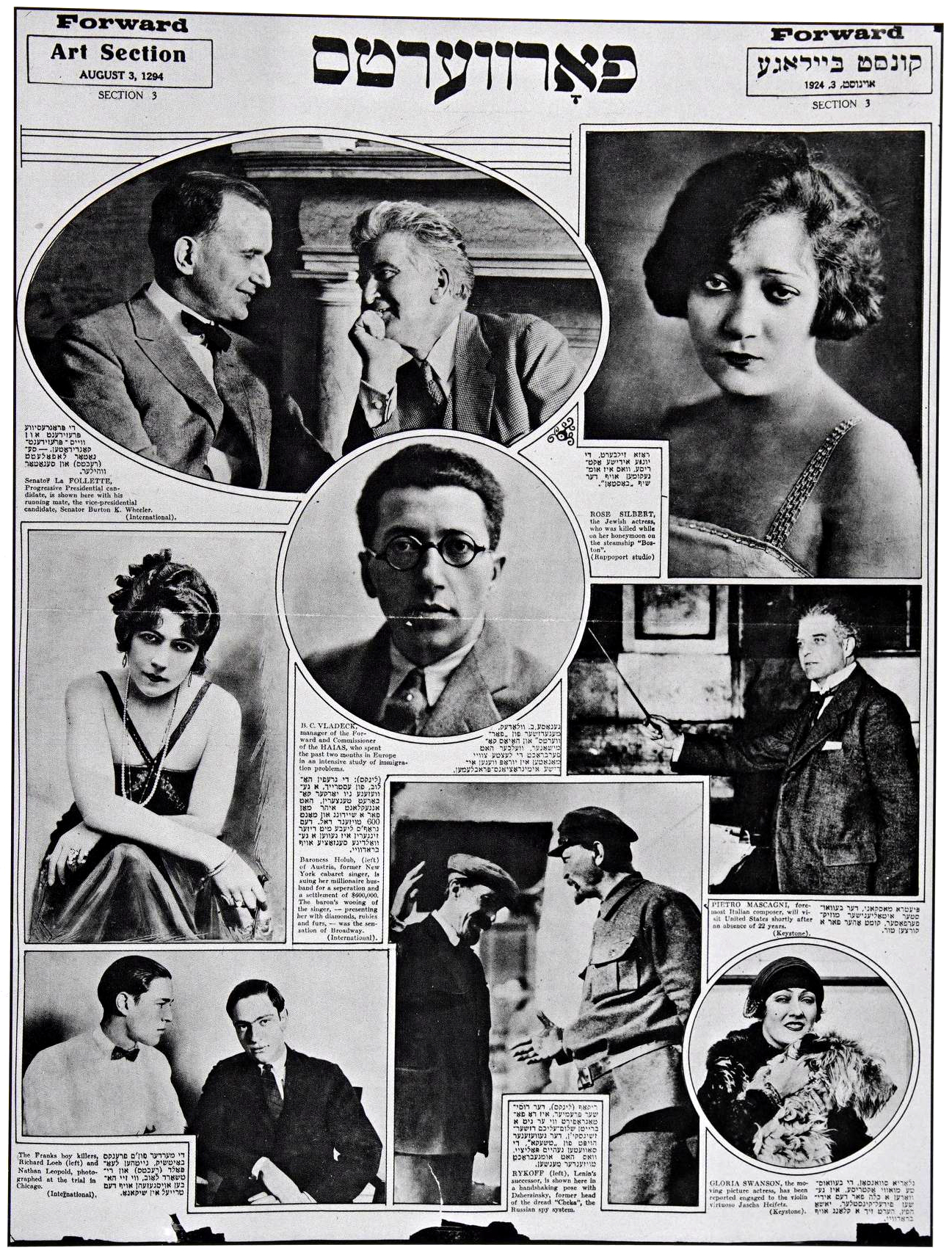
This August 3, 1924 art section of The Forward displays prominent figures of the era, including Presidential candidate Robert M. La Follette and his running mate Burton K. Wheeler, soon-to-be convicted murderers Nathan Leopold and Richard Loeb, Soviet functionaries Alexei Rykov and Felix Dzerzhinsky, actress Gloria Swanson, composer Pietro Mascagni, and Forward manager Baruch Charney Vladeck.

In 1933–34, The Forward was the first to publish Fred Beal's eyewitness reports of bureaucratic privilege and of famine in the Soviet Union, accounts of the kind that much of the liberal and left-wing press disparaged and resisted. His story corroborated that of the paper's labor editor, Harry Lang, who had visited Soviet Ukraine.

In response to the first reports of atrocities against the Jewish population of German-occupied Poland, special correspondent A. Brodie complained of exaggerated dispatches and lack of facts. But as accounts accumulated in the winter of 1939–40 of mass arrests, forced labor, massacres, executions and expulsions, the paper discerned the outline of the unfolding Holocaust.

=== After World War II ===
In 1953, The Forward took the position that Julius and Ethel Rosenberg were guilty but held that the death sentence was too harsh a punishment.

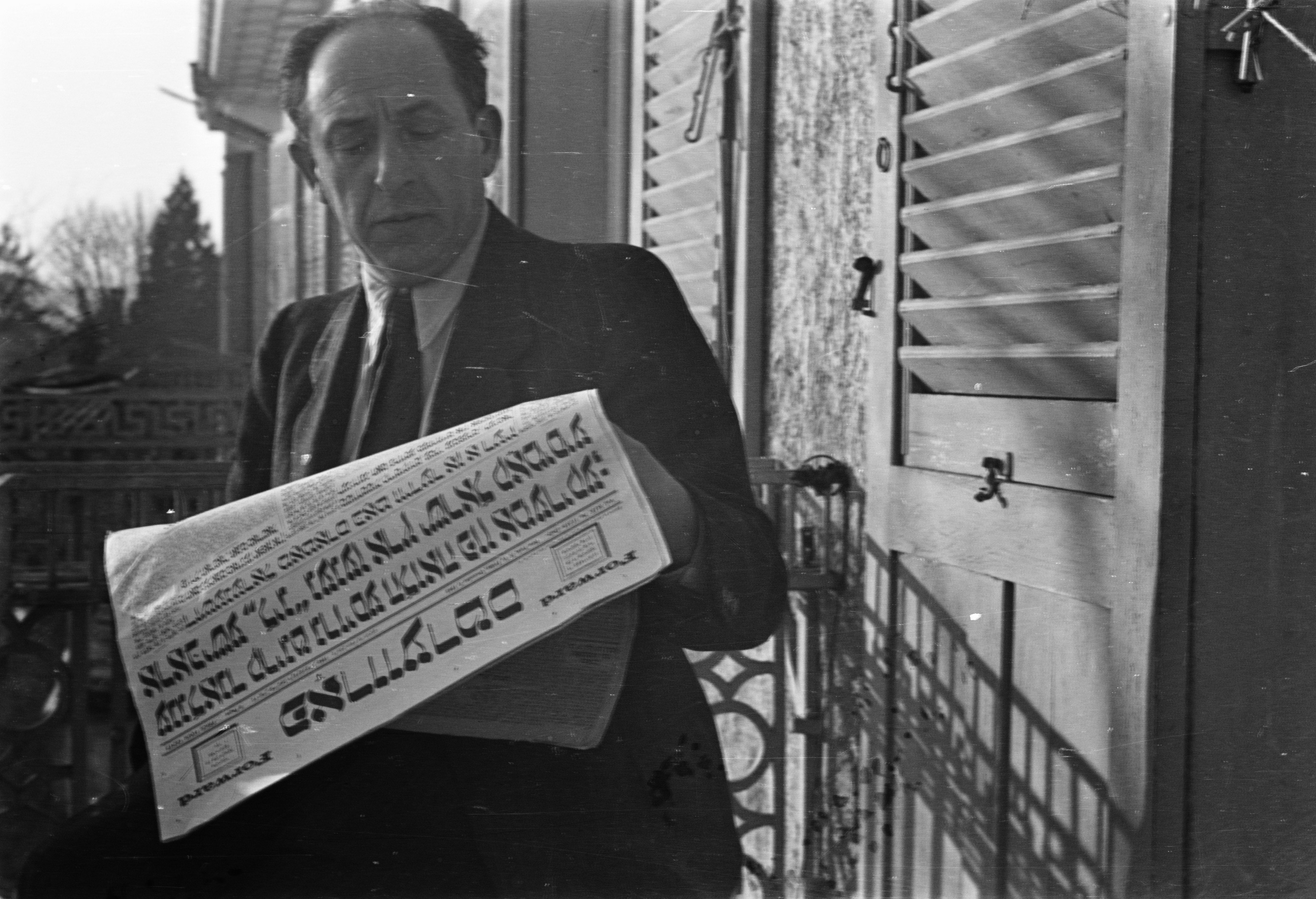
Survivor of a Nazi concentration camp reading The Forward in Germany on 11 March 1946

By 1962, circulation was down to 56,126 daily and 59,636 Sunday, and by 1983 the newspaper was published only once a week, with an English supplement. In 1990, the English supplement became an independent weekly which by 2000 had a circulation of 26,183, while the Yiddish weekly had a circulation of 7,000 and falling.

As the influence of the Socialist Party in both American politics and in the Jewish community waned, the paper joined the American liberal mainstream though it maintained a social democratic orientation. The English version has some standing in the Jewish community as an outlet of liberal policy analysis. For a period in the 1990s, conservatives came to the fore of the English edition of the paper, but the break from tradition did not last. (A number of conservatives dismissed from The Forward later helped to found the modern New York Sun.)

=== 21st century ===
The Yiddish edition has recently enjoyed a modest increase in circulation as courses in the language have become more popular among university students; circulation has leveled out at about 5,500. Boris Sandler, one of the most significant contemporary secular writers in Yiddish, was the editor of the Yiddish Forward for 18 years, until March 2016; the new editor who succeeded him is Rukhl Schaechter.

Between 2013 and 2017, The Forward published an online edition and English weekly and Yiddish biweekly editions, each effectively operating independently. Jane Eisner became the first female editor in chief of the English Forward in June 2008, following J. J. Goldberg.

In August 2015, The Forward received wide attention for reporting from Iran at a charged moment in American politics, as the U.S. Congress was ramping up to a vote on an accord reached the month before to limit Tehran's nuclear ability in return for lifting international oil and financial sanctions. Assistant Managing Editor Larry Cohler-Esses was, in the words of The New York Times, "The first journalist from an American Jewish pro-Israel publication to be given an Iranian visa since 1979."

In the fall of 1995, The Forward launched a Russian-language edition under the editorship of Vladimir Yedidowich in response to demand for "a strongly Jewish, yet with a secular, social-democratic orientation and an appreciation for the cultural dimension of Jewish life" from the fast-growing émigré community. The Russian edition was sold to Russian American Jews for Israel in 2004. In contrast to its English counterpart, the Russian edition and its readership were more sympathetic to right-wing voices. In March 2007, it was renamed the Forum.

Around the same time in 2004, the Forward Association also sold off its interest in WEVD to The Walt Disney Company's sports division, ESPN.

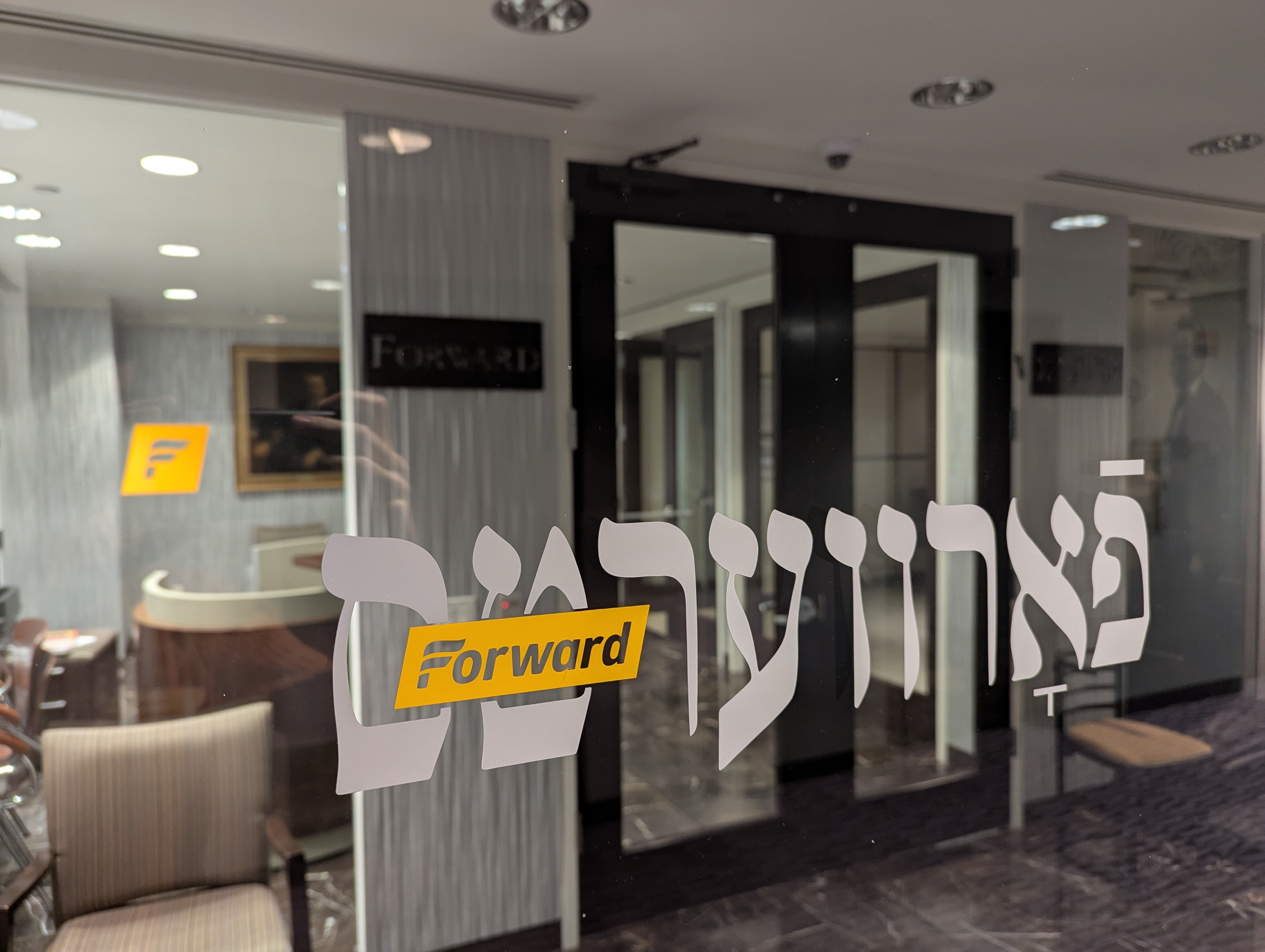
Entrance to the Maiden Lane office of The Forward

The name of the publication was shortened to The Forward in April 2015.

As of July 2016, The Forward began publishing a monthly magazine. The last newspaper published was the June 30, 2016, issue.

On January 17, 2019, the publication announced it would discontinue its print edition and only publish its English and Yiddish editions online. Layoffs of its editor-in-chief and 20% of its editorial staff were also announced.

Jodi Rudoren was named editor in July 2019, and took charge in September 2019. She left the newspaper and returned to The New York Times, where she had previously worked, in April 2025.

The Forward began publishing in English in the 1980s, and a 2019 review observed that both Yiddish and English were being produced for its online edition.

Funding for the English edition became available when The Forward sold its FM radio station.

While the idea was said to have germinated in 1983, when the Yiddish-only paper "announced that it was going to retreat to weekly publication," and the actualization of an English edition as an ongoing paper in 1990, by 2010 Seth Lipsky was described as "formerly editor of the English-language edition."

== Content ==
=== Political alignment ===
The paper maintains a left of center and progressive editorial stance.

=== Notable columns and features ===
For 24 years, The Forward was the home of the column "Philologos". It now runs in Mosaic.

The best-known writer in the Yiddish Forward was Isaac Bashevis Singer, who received the Nobel Prize in Literature. Other well known contributors included Leon Trotsky, S.L. Shneiderman, and Morris Winchevsky.

The Forward's contributors include Debra Nussbaum Cohen, Sam Kestenbaum, and Ilene Prushner; opinion columnist Deborah Lipstadt; art critics Anya Ulinich, and cartoonist Liana Finck. Liberal writer Peter Beinart was a columnist for the Forward until 2020, when he left for the left-wing publication Jewish Currents.

Alana Newhouse, who authored what The New York Times called "a coffee-table book" (A Living Lens: Photographs of Jewish Life From the Pages of The Forward), was the paper's arts and culture editor.

The Forward was home to an early and long running advice column for Jewish immigrants, A Bintel Brief. The New York Times described it as "homespun advice ... which predated Dear Abby."

The "Forward 50" is a list of 50 Jewish Americans "who have made a significant impact on the Jewish story in the past year", published annually as an editorial opinion of The Forward since 1994. The list was the initiative of Seth Lipsky, founding editor of the English Forward.

According to the magazine's website, this is not a scientific study, but rather the opinion of staff members, assisted by nominations from readers. The Forward does not endorse or support any of the people in the listing. The rankings are divided into different categories (which may vary from year to year): Top Picks, Politics, Activism, Religion, Community, Culture, Philanthropy, Scandals, Sports and, as of 2010, Food.

The list also includes those Jews whose impact in the past year has been dramatic and damaging.

In 2021, The Forward published the "Forward Shortlist" instead, which named seven people. In celebration of the magazine's 125th anniversary in 2022, the "Forward 125" was introduced, a list of the 125 most influential American Jews from 1897 to 2022.

=== Notable interviews ===
- Barack Obama
- Ruth Bader Ginsburg
- Gal Gadot
- Joe Biden
- Natan Sharansky

== Recognition ==
The Forward was considered one of the first national newspapers in the United States.

In 2020, The Forward was nominated for a James Beard Foundation Award and won nine Rockower Awards. The Forward won two Religion News Association Awards and 34 Rockower Awards in 2021. In 2022, the Forward won two Religion News Association Awards and a record of 43 Rockower Awards. In 2023, the American Jewish Press Association awarded The Forward 33 Rockower Awards.

== Jewish Daily Forward Building ==
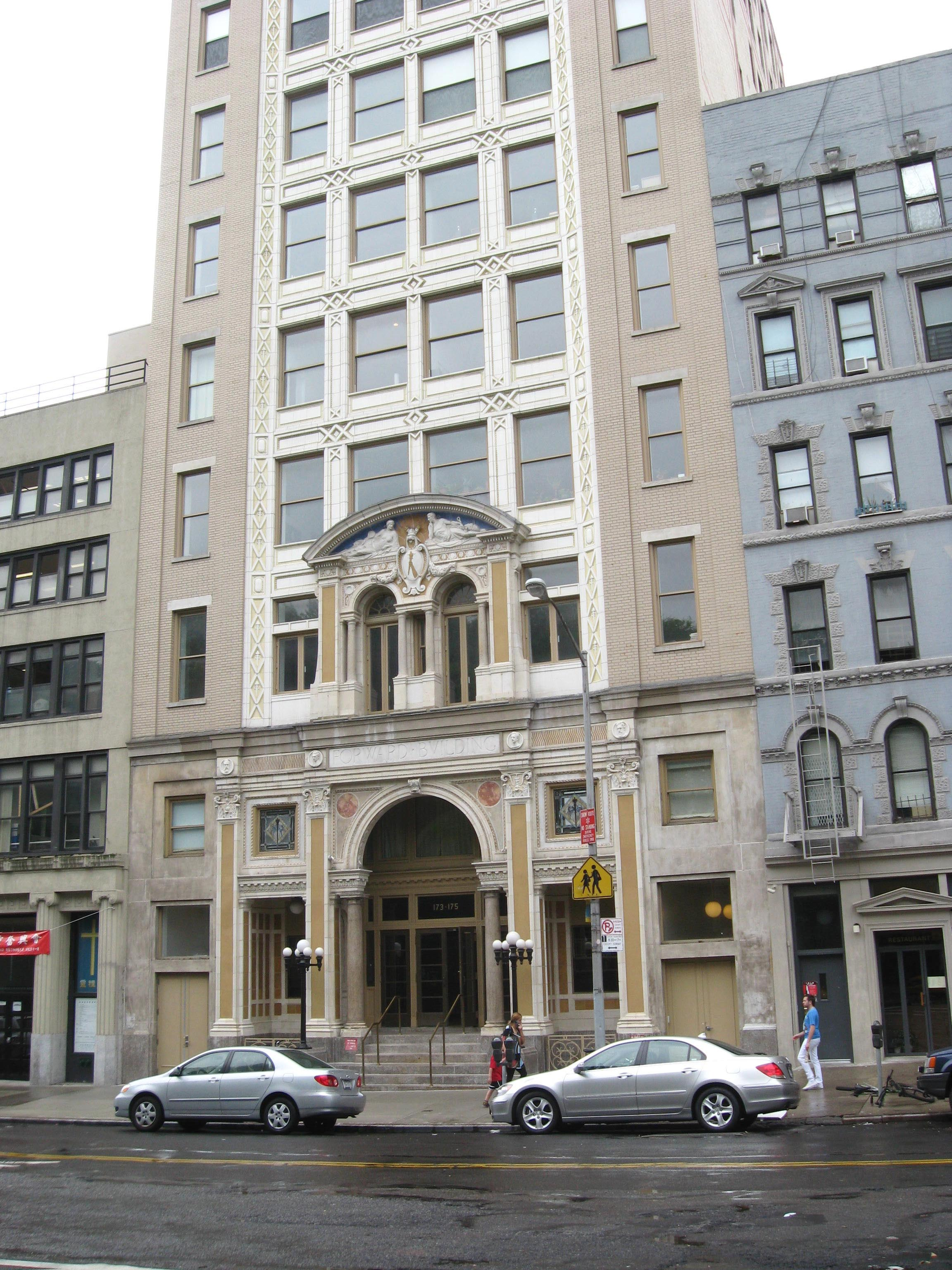
Forward Building facade

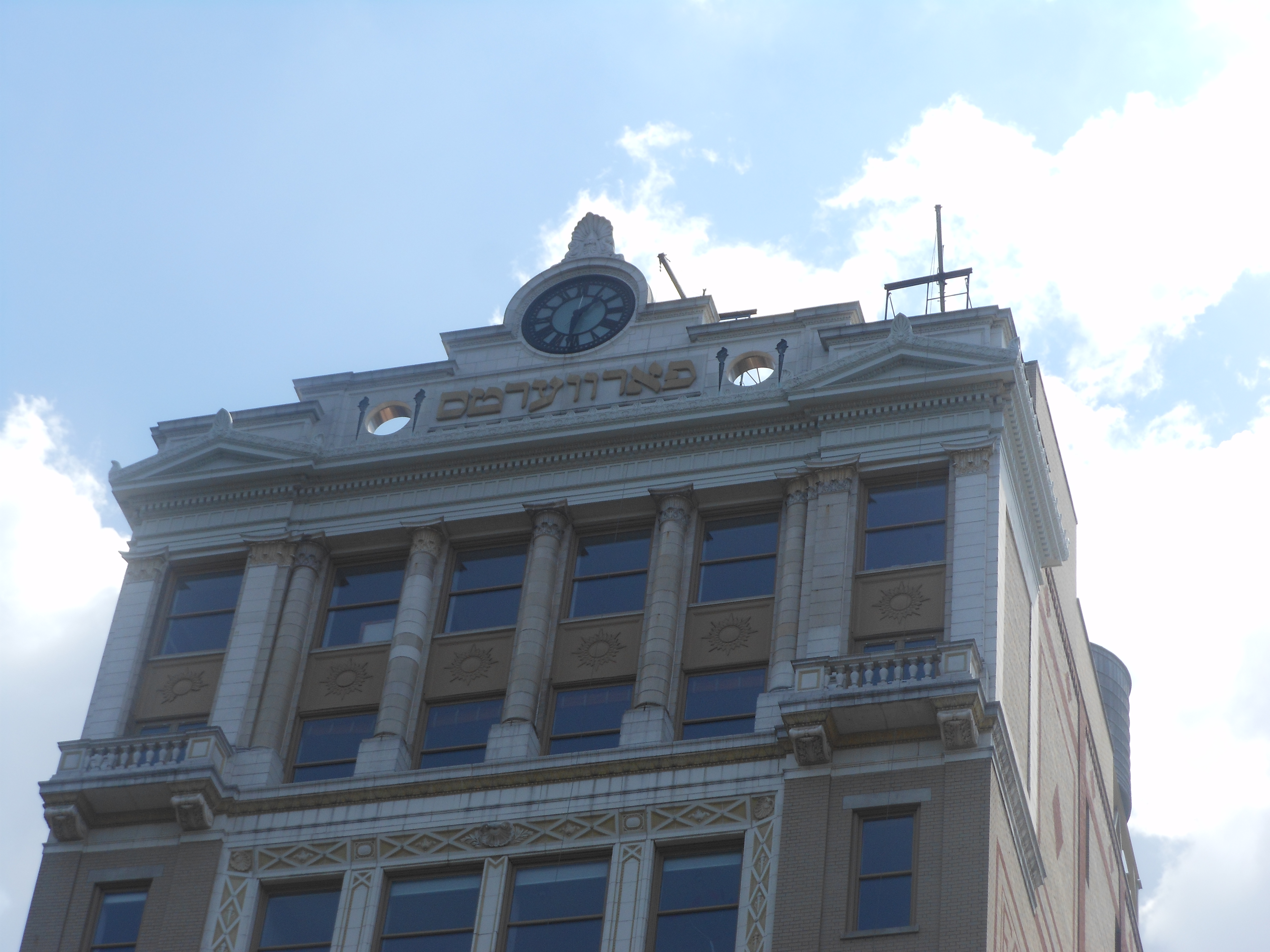
Top of Forward Building

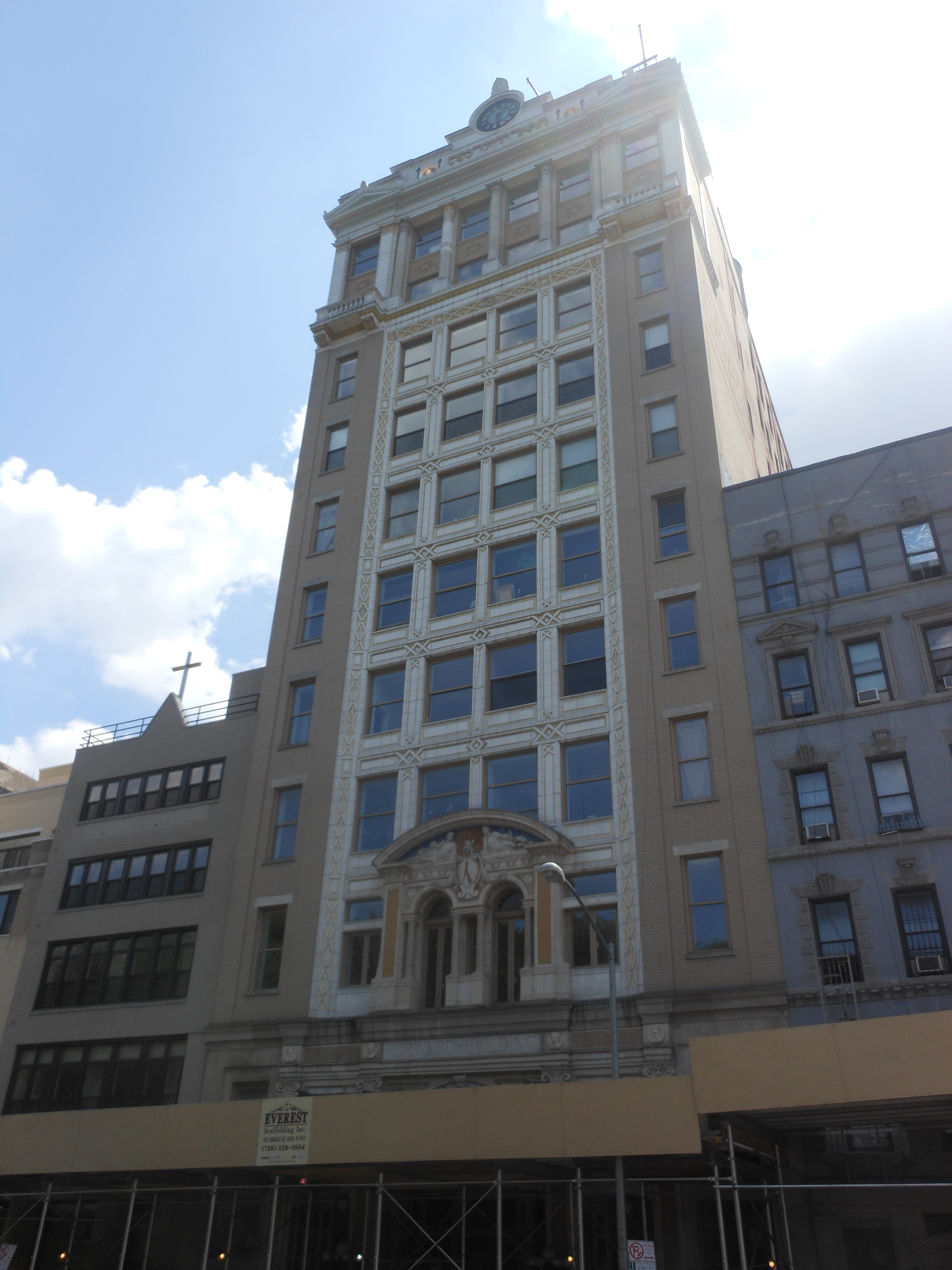
Front view of Forward Building

At the peak of its circulation, The Forward erected a ten-story office building at 175 East Broadway on the Lower East Side, designed by architect George Boehm and completed in 1912. It was a prime location, across the street from Seward Park. The building was embellished with marble columns and panels and stained glass windows. The facade features carved bas relief portraits of Karl Marx, Friedrich Engels (who co-authored, with Marx, The Communist Manifesto), and Ferdinand Lassalle, founder of the first mass German labor party. A fourth relief portrays a person whose identity has not been clearly established, and has been identified as Wilhelm Liebknecht, Karl Liebknecht, or August Bebel. The paper moved out in 1974, and in the real-estate boom of the 1990s the building was converted to condominiums. The Forward, which in 2007 was headquartered at East 33rd Street, is in the Financial District as of 2020.

== Leadership ==
=== Editors-in-chief ===
| 1903–1951 | Abraham Cahan |
| 1951–1962 | Harry Rogoff |
| 1962–1968 | Lazar Fogelman |
| 1968–1970 | Morris Crystal |
| 1970–1987 | Simon Weber |
| 1988–1998 | Mordechai Strigler |

=== General managers ===
| 1909–1912 | Benjamin Schlesinger |
| 1912–1917 | Adolph Held |
| 1918–1938 | Baruch Charney Vladeck |
| 1939–1962 | Alexander Kahn |
| 1962–1967 | Adolph Held |
| 1967–1969 | Daniel Ifshin |
| 1970– | Paul Rubinstein |

== See also ==
- Algemeiner Journal
- Institute for Nonprofit News (member)
