= The Forgotten Man: A New History of the Great Depression =

Book by Amity Shlaes

- Hardcover, US first edition, HarperCollins, 2007
- Author: Amity Shlaes
- Cover artist: Jaime Putorti
- Language: English
- Subject: Great Depression
- Genre: History
- Publisher: HarperCollins
- Publication date: June 12, 2007
- Publication place: United States
- Media type: Print
- Pages: 480
- ISBN: 0-06-621170-0
- Dewey Decimal: 973.91/6 22
- LC Class: E806 .S52 2007

The Forgotten Man: A New History of the Great Depression is a book by Amity Shlaes published by HarperCollins in 2007. The book is a re-analysis of the events of the Great Depression, generally from a free market perspective. The book criticizes Herbert Hoover and the Smoot-Hawley Tariff as exacerbating the Depression through government intervention. It opines that Franklin D. Roosevelt pursued erratic policies that froze investment and failed to take the steps needed to stop the Depression, and that the New Deal extended the length of the Depression and had deleterious effects on individuals.

Shlaes praises the model offered by Wendell Willkie before the 1940 presidential election, where the New Deal would have been scaled back and business would have stepped in.

The book begins with an anecdote of the 1937 recession, eight years after the Depression began, when Roosevelt adopted budget-balancing policies indistinguishable from the stereotype of what Hoover supposedly did. Shlaes presents her arguments in part by telling stories of self-starters who showed what the free market could have accomplished without the New Deal.

The book argues that members of FDR's "Brain Trust", including Rexford Tugwell of Columbia University, had connections to the Soviets and their interest in central planning.

Shlaes used the term forgotten man in the sense famous classical liberal thinker William Graham Sumner coined the term to refer to the middle class.

== Reception ==
The Forgotten Man has been praised by Republican politicians such as Newt Gingrich, Rudolph Giuliani, Mark Sanford, Jon Kyl, and Mike Pence. Fred Barnes of the conservative Weekly Standard has called Shlaes one of the Republican Party's major assets. Amity Shlaes's book on the failure of the New Deal to revive the economy, The Forgotten Man, was widely read by Republicans in Washington. In February 2009 during the Senate confirmation hearing for Energy Secretary Steven Chu, Republican Senator John Barrasso waved a copy of the book and announced, "In these economic times, a number of members of the Senate are reading a book called The Forgotten Man, about the history of the Great Depression, as we compare and look for solutions, as we look at a stimulus package."

Novelist Mark Helprin praised the book, "Were John Kenneth Galbraith and Milton Friedman to spend a century or two reconciling their positions to arrive at a clear view of the Great Depression, this would be it.".

On the other hand, The Forgotten Man and its key arguments have been criticized by liberal Nobel Prize-winning economist Paul Krugman, among others. Krugman wrote of "a whole intellectual industry, mainly operating out of right-wing think tanks, devoted to propagating the idea that FDR actually made the Depression worse.... But the definitive study of fiscal policy in the 1930s, by the MIT economist E. Cary Brown, reached a very different conclusion: Fiscal stimulus was unsuccessful 'not because it does not work, but because it was not tried'." Krugman is among a number of reviewers who criticized Shlaes for "misleading statistics"—specifically the use of a series for employment during the 1930s that omitted those working in public works programs.

Shlaes responded to Krugman in the Wall Street Journal that the Bureau of Labor Statistics series she had used "intentionally did not include temporary jobs in emergency programs—because to count a short-term, make-work project as a real job was to mask the anxiety of one who really didn't have regular work with long-term prospects". Shlaes said that if the Obama administration "proposes F.D.R.-style recovery programs, then it is useful to establish whether those original programs actually brought recovery. The answer is, they didn't."

Writing in Forbes, former United States Department of Labor chief economist and Hudson Institute fellow Diana Furchtgott-Roth called it the "economic fight of the year." After analyzing both Shlaes' view and Krugman's criticism, she concluded that "the new president needs to listen to many voices."

Other critics of The Forgotten Man include: Depression historian Robert S. McElvaine, who classifies it in a review in the journal Labor History as "born-again Antisocial Darwinism" and calls it "as much a brief for the Bush tax cuts of 2001 as it is a history of the Depression of the 1930s"; historian Matthew Dallek, who has called Amity Shlaes a "revisionist" with a "blind view of the New Deal"; historian Eric Rauchway, who wrote that Shlaes ignored historical GDP easily available in the Historical Statistics of the United States; and journalist Jonathan Chait of The New Republic who wrote, "intellectual coherence is not the purpose of Shlaes's project. The real point is to recreate the political mythology of the period."
