= Seth Lipsky =

American journalist (born 1946)

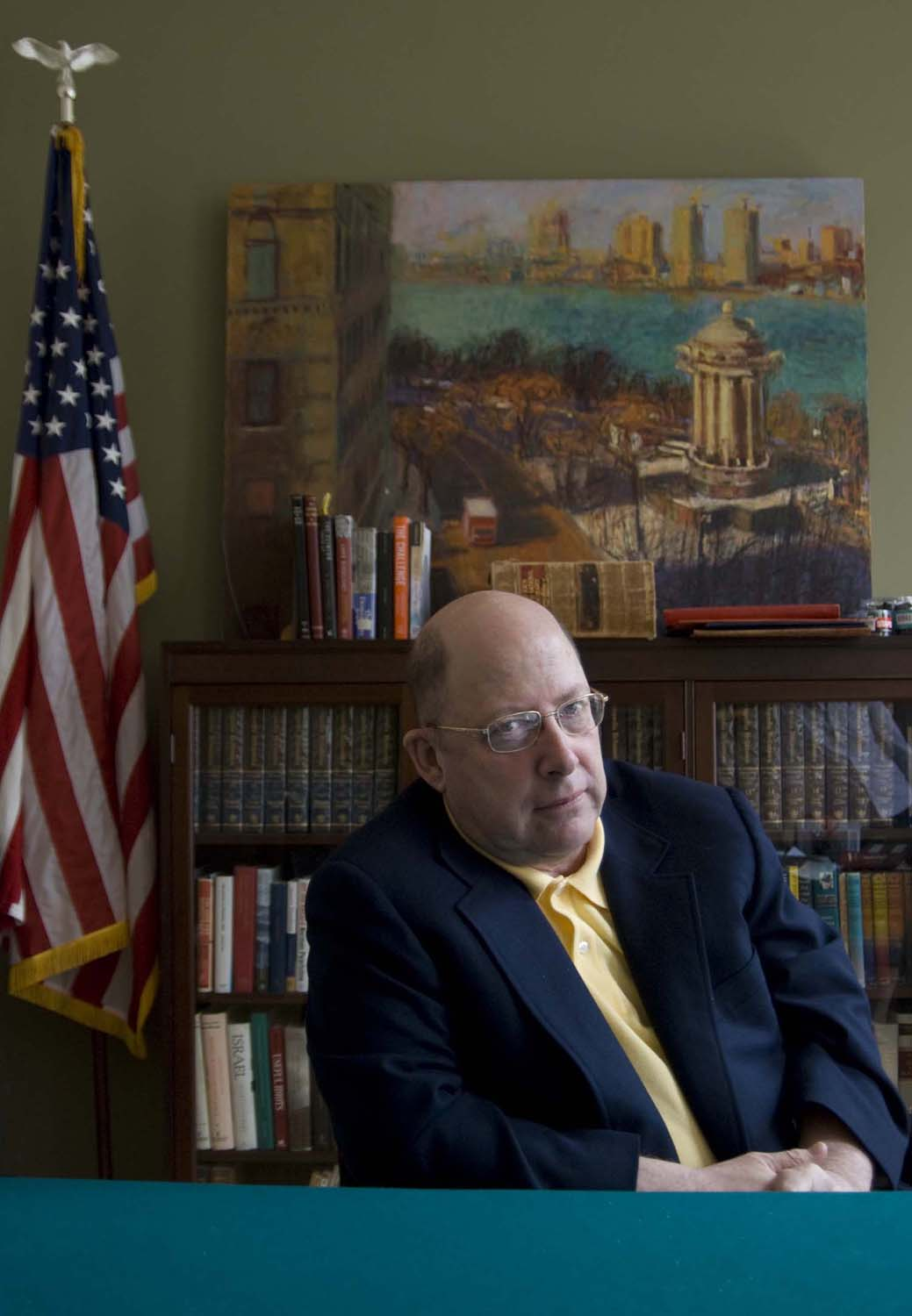
Lipsky in 2008

Seth Lipsky (born 1946) is the founder and editor of the New York Sun, an independent conservative daily in New York City that ceased its print edition on September 30, 2008. Lipsky counts Ronald Reagan, Margaret Thatcher, Winston Churchill, Ariel Sharon, and Milton Friedman among his intellectual and ideological heroes. He has a long history of working in the newspaper business, including "a nearly 20-year-long career" at the Wall Street Journal that included Asia and Belgium.

Lipsky also founded and was editor of The Forward, an English-language successor to a Yiddish-language longtime newspaper of the same name.

He has also written several invited articles and guest opinions for The New York Times, and is the author of six books.

== Early life and education ==
Born 1946 in Brooklyn, from age one Lipsky was "raised in a secular Jewish family in Great Barrington, Mass" and graduated from Harvard University in 1968.

== The Jewish Daily Forward ==
In 1990, Lipsky started an English-language weekly version of The Jewish Daily Forward (The Forward), which was previously a widely read Yiddish-language daily newspaper. Lipsky resigned in 2000 after a clash with the owners of The Forward, who threatened to shut down the English-language publication unless Lipsky was fired. The dispute was over Lipsky's editorials supporting Ronald Reagan and the war in Vietnam.

== The New York Sun ==
In 2002 he founded and began serving as editor of The New York Sun. Although the paper only lasted six years, and gave away more copies than it sold, a spokesperson at the United Nations admitted, after a criticism by The Sun, that the paper "does punch way above its circulation number, on occasion." Lipsky's problems were compounded in that he began and operated at a time when the newspaper industry's situation was described as "pretty grim."

Among its noteworthy "social life" features were the paper's Along the Wine Trail wine column and crossword puzzle.

In 1991, Lipsky was a finalist for the Pulitzer Prize for Editorial Writing for his Forward editorials "on a variety of national issues, including some of specific interest to the American Jewish community."

=== Shutting down the print edition ===
When it was time to give his 110 full-time employees the bad news, he made it "'in an orderly way' ... not filing for bankruptcy ... pay employees through November ... health insurance ... through Dec. 31." When asked why the shutdown, Lipsky said "we needed additional funds ... the 2008 financial collapse was sweeping the world, and the Internet was emerging as a challenge to traditional newspapering."

== Selected works ==
- The Citizens Constitution: An Annotated Guide
- The Rise of Abraham Cahan
- The Floating Kilogram

== Teaching ==
A 2011 interview's overview listed second "teaching at Columbia University's School of Journalism."

== Personal ==
Lipsky served in the U.S. Armed Forces and wrote for Stars and Stripes while in Vietnam. He is married to Amity Shlaes, a columnist and author.
