= Robert Graboyes =

American economist

Robert F. Graboyes is an economist, journalist, and musician at RFG Counterpoint, LLC, in Alexandria, Virginia. Author of Fortress and Frontier in American Health Care and publisher of the newsletter Bastiat's Window, he writes on the technology and politicization of healthcare. He has taught health economics, and received the Reason Foundation's Bastiat Prize for Journalism in 2014.

== Education and teaching ==
Graboyes earned his PhD in economics from Columbia University. He also earned master's degrees from Columbia University, Virginia Commonwealth University, and the College of William and Mary, as well as a bachelor's degree from the University of Virginia. He taught full-time at the University of Richmond and, over a 20-year period, also taught part-time at Virginia Commonwealth University, the University of Virginia, George Washington University, and George Mason University.
