= Bastiat Prize =

Journalism award

The Bastiat Prize was a journalism award given annually by the Reason Foundation. In 2011 and before it was given by the International Policy Network. The Bastiat Prize recognized journalists whose published works "explain, promote and defend the principles of the free society." The award came with US$15,000.

Instituted in 2002, the Prize was inspired by the 19th-century French philosopher Frédéric Bastiat and his defense of liberty. Bastiat's use of satire and allegory enabled him to relate complex economic issues to a general audience. In keeping with his legacy, Bastiat Prize entries were judged on intellectual content, the persuasiveness of the language used, and the type of publication in which they appeared.

Judges included Margaret Thatcher, James Buchanan, and Milton Friedman.

== Prize winners ==
- 2002: Sauvik Chakraverti and Amity Shlaes.
- 2003: Brian Carney.
- 2004: Robert Guest.
- 2005: Mary Anastasia O'Grady.
- 2006: Tim Harford and Jamie Whyte.
- 2007: Amit Varma
- 2008: A. Barton Hinkle.
- 2009: John Hasnas, Shikha Dalmia, and Daniel Hannan
- 2010: James Delingpole and Bret Stephens
- 2011: Tom Easton and Virginia Postrel
- 2012: Anne Jolis
- 2013: Lane Filler and Ross Clark
- 2014: Robert Graboyes
- 2015: Amit Varma
- 2016: Tim Harford
- 2017: Radley Balko and Hugo Restall
- 2018: Bari Weiss
