= Mary O'Grady =

American journalist and editor at the Wall Street Journal

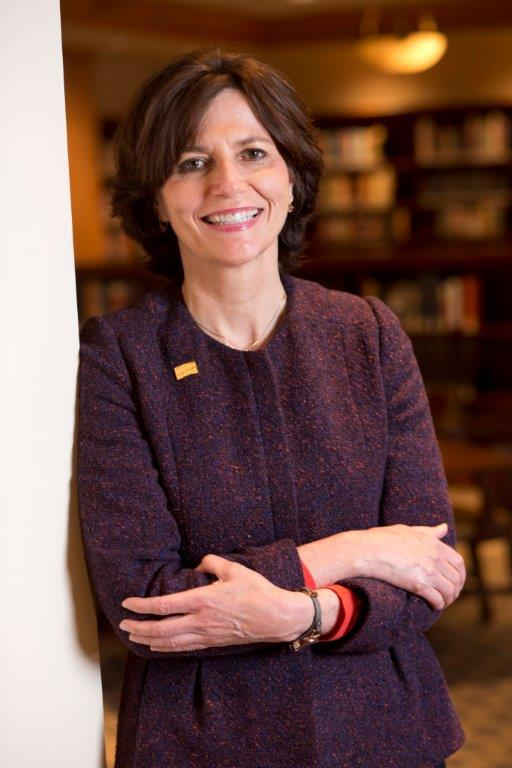
- Born: Mary Anastasia O'Grady; Pennsylvania, U.S.
- Occupations: Editor, columnist
- Employer: The Wall Street Journal

Mary Anastasia O'Grady is an American editor involved in several controversial articles, and columnist who works for The Wall Street Journal. She has, also, been a member of The Wall Street Journal editorial board since 2005. She writes predominantly on Latin America and is a co-editor of the Index of Economic Freedom. She is a recipient of the Bastiat Prize.

== Education ==
A 1975 graduate of Guilford (CT) Senior High School, O'Grady earned a bachelor's degree in English from Assumption College and later received an MBA from Pace University in financial management.

== Career ==
Before her work for The Wall Street Journal (WSJ), she was an options strategist for Advest, Thomson McKinnon Securities then Merrill Lynch, where she worked for 10 years.

In August 1995, O'Grady joined WSJ and later became a senior editorial page writer for the journal in December 1999. In November 2005, she was appointed as a member of WSJ's editorial board.

She is also editor of "The Americas," a weekly column that appears every Monday and deals with politics, economics and business in Latin America and Canada while also serving as a member of the board of directors at Liberty Fund.

She is well known for her positions regarding classical liberalism, her frontal rejection of leftist governments in the Americas and for being in favor of the legalization of drug use.

She has been characterized by her strong position against progressive governments, which has elicited responses from people such as former US President Jimmy Carter, who wrote an article in response to O'Grady. She has been criticized in the Salvadoran online newspaper Diario La Pagina for her support, through her columns, of the controversial and nepotistic privatization process in El Salvador.

In an article published on The Wall Street Journal, she linked Iran with the government of Mexican President Andrés Manuel López Obrador citing "secret intelligence sources." The Mexican president publicly denied the contents of the article in a press conference, characterizing the article as false information.

== Honors and awards ==
=== Awards ===
- Inter American Press Association's David Gleaner Award (1997)
- International Policy Network's Bastiat Prize (2005)
- Association of Private Enterprise Education's Thomas Jefferson Award (2009)
- The Fund for American Studies' Walter Judd Freedom Award (2012)

=== Honorary degrees ===
O'Grady was awarded the following honorary degrees:

- Francisco Marroquin University, honorary doctorate (2015)
