= The Perfect City =

- Music: Martin Coslett
- Lyrics: Martin Coslett – member of Mercury Musical Developments, London
- Book: Martin Coslett, Ross J Clark (also Mercury Musical Developments member)
- Basis: A Passionate Englishman by Kate Price
- Productions: 2013 Off-West-End: Etcetera Theatre 2014 UK Spring Tour: Cambridge, Brighton, Rickmansworth, Jordans, Dorking, London

The Perfect City is a musical by Martin Coslett and Ross Clark, based on William Penn, the 17th-century London aristocrat and Quaker idealist who leaves his repressive home country behind to construct a utopian city in Philadelphia, Pennsylvania.

== Characters ==
- William Penn, the hero
- Gulielma Springett, good Quaker girl, soon to be William's wife
- Philip Ford, the Admiral's business adviser and William's unscrupulous agent
- Bridget, Philip Ford's maid and bedfellow
- Admiral Penn, King Charles II's retired Admiral of the Fleet
- Anthony, servant to William's father
- Algernon Sidney, a firebrand revolutionary
- Mary, Lord Baltimore's servant girl
- Lord Baltimore, a powerful landowner

== Musical numbers ==
=== Act one ===
1. Opening/Come to the Ball (Ensemble)
2. Simple Lives (William, Guli)
3. Salmon Sermon (George Fox, spoken)
4. The Inner Light (George Fox)
5. Simple Lives Reprise (William, Guli, Friends)
6. You Are Not My Son (Admiral)/No Toleration (Mob)
7. The Spice Of My Life (Ford, Bridget)
8. The Perfect City: In Jail (William, Guli)
9. The Promise Of A Lifetime/Raging Sea (Guli, Admiral)
10. The Spice Of My Life Reprise (Ford, Bridget)
11. The Promise Of A Lifetime 2 (Guli, Admiral, William)
12. Happy Healthy and Wealthy – The Wedding
13. The Perfect City Reprise: At Home (William, Guli, Algy, Anthony)
14. Selling Off The Land (William, Ford)
15. Welcome To My World (William)
16. What's Good Enough For Me (Algernon)
17. I Am Your Wife (Guli)
18. Save Our World For You (William, Guli, Ensemble)

=== Act two ===
1. Friends And Foreigners (William, Anthony, Ensemble)
2. Why? (Mary)
3. Honest Gentleman (Settlers, Baltimore)
4. Ever Yours (William, Guli)
5. Anthony's Song/Set them Free (Anthony, William, Ensemble)
6. My Mary (Anthony)
7. A City Called Heaven (Ensemble)

== March 2013 production ==
The first production of The Perfect City was a showcase production put on at London's Etcetera Theatre, Camden on March 17 and 18, 2013. In May 2015 The Perfect City (with some new cast members including Jamie Noar as William Penn) was taken on a tour of venues (mainly Friends Meeting Houses) in the South East of England to huge success with sell outs at places like Dorking, Surrey, UK.

=== Cast ===
Name	Character
Alex Marshall	William Penn
Mira Ormala	Gulielma Springett
Fredrick Ruth (Frido Ruth)	Philip Ford
Jennifer O'Keeffe	Bridget
Paul Bentinck	Admiral Penn
David Booth	Anthony
Daniel Breakwell	Algernon Sidney
Rosemary Lippard	Mary
Adrian Morrissey	Lord Baltimore

=== Creative Team ===
Martin Coslett	Book, Music and Lyrics
Ross J Clark	Book
Andrew Miller	Director
Albin Balint	Dramaturg
Gemma Hawkins	Musical Director

== Plot summary ==
William, a wealthy Navy Admiral's son, is coming to terms with his beliefs and his calling. He explains to his colleague, Algernon, that he believes everyone is equal in the eyes of God to speak freely and worship in any way they see fit. William becomes disgusted at scenes of decadence and violence in London but then they meet Guli and the Friends and agree that a simple life is the best life. William goes home to meet his father. However, his father is very angry and says he will rot in hell if he continues his rebellious ways.

The Friends go to a meeting outside a locked room. William makes a speech (Salmon Speech) is arrested and taken to court. William is accused of incitement. The Judge is furious and everyone is jailed, including the jury. In prison, the jailers make fun of the posh Admiral's boy. He sees people starving and dying from smallpox and the plague. Guli who is visiting her father, recognises William and they begin to fall in love. Guli goes to speak to the Admiral to ask him for help. The Admiral believes that Friends take part in witchcraft, astrology, and magic. Guli puts him straight and tells him that he should do something to get his son and her father out of prison. In jail, William vows to change things and help his poor friends if he is ever freed.

The Admiral arranges for his son to be released. William finds Guli and asks her to marry him. Anthony, the servant, interrupts the wedding to say the Admiral has had a bad fall and may be dying. Guli persuades William to go to his father. The Admiral forgives his son and bequeaths him land in America that the King owes him and asks him to look after his loyal servant, Anthony.

When William receives the deeds to the land in America. Ford discusses with William how he must market and sell plots of land, but William tells him he will be staying in England with his new family.

More Friends are arrested and tortured. William receives a letter telling him that they will be released on condition that he takes them away. Ford encourages him to sell land in America to make their fortune, as his father was not always a “wise investor”. They all look forward to a new life in America.

William and Guli have an argument about whether their family can go abroad. Guli states her worries for their children and about the practicalities of travelling and life in strange lands. William Penn – the idealistic dreamer has other things on his mind ....his thoughts of a Free Land and his belief that God has chosen his destiny. Algy also tells William he will not be going with him. Guli suggests that William takes Anthony in their place.

William and the others pray to God to bless their voyage. As they prepare for the voyage on the ship, “The Welcome”, they are warned about bad weather, monsters of the deep and vicious Indians when they get there. Guli, the children and the crowds stay behind and say farewell to William and the first Quaker emigrant families. William takes the ‘kitchen sink’ with him. Just before they leave, Philip Ford gets him to sign business papers. Anthony has tried to warn William not to trust Ford – but William hasn't heard.

Lights coming up on “the perfect city” being built in Pennsylvania, America:

William writes to Guli explaining how 30 people died from smallpox on their ship before they landed in America. On arrival, he meets the various settlers from Sweden and Denmark and the native Indians. As the first Governor of Pennsylvania, William appoints officers to the Assembly and Council and instructs as they build his “Perfect City”.

William greets Francis Pastorius who arrives from Germany. William finds him plots of land for the new families in a place they name Germantown. Anthony again tries to warn William that Philip Ford is swindling him but William ignores him.

Lord Baltimore visits with his servant Mary. He tells William how he trusts no-one and thinks William has taken land that belongs to him. Anthony meets Mary and falls in love. An argument ensues between Baltimore and William over the borders of their properties (and who owns the land his city is being built on). He mentions that Maryland is being developed much faster with the use of slaves obtained by the King's Royal African Company (RAC)

The Settlers complain to William about the laws even though they are not paying him rents. Ford writes to tell William he is losing money and needs to do something about it. Francis Pastorius campaigns against slavery and totally fails to persuade the settlers. Anthony secretly tells Francis (William's Friend) that he has met the love of his life, Mary, who is a servant of Baltimore. Francis tells him to take care. When the Settlers begin to buy more ‘servants’, William is torn between the Golden Rule: how all people should be treated fairly and the needs of the Settlers for workers on their lands. William tells Anthony he has to look at life's realities. The Settlers need ‘servants’ to create wealth. Francis tells William that 10 years hard labour is enough for anyone, then they should be given freedom and land for their families. William agrees and suggests they give them tools to help them start as farmers. William explains to Anthony that he will put forward a bill in the assembly to allow ‘servants’ to get married. However, the bill fails to get sufficient votes. Anthony hears the result and tries to run away with Mary. Baltimore catches Anthony and murders Mary. Anthony is jailed and threatened with the death penalty for Mary's murder. William is torn between building, ‘The Perfect City’ and doing what is right-saving his servant.

William receives a letter from Guli. She tells him about the death of their new baby. She tells of the continued persecution of the Friends in England and how Algernon has been executed for treason. She asks William to look after Anthony and finally, she says that Ford has stopped sending her money. When Anthony is brought before the court, William asks God what he should do. He realises what he has become when he orders his Jury to find Anthony innocent. There is outcry. So he hurriedly returns to England taking Anthony to safety. They find Guli in bed – she is very ill. Ford arrives and William confronts him. Ford tells him that he has forfeited Pennsylvania by signing it away as well as the fortune to be made through slavery. William is so angry that he is about to kill Ford when Anthony reminds him of his pacifism. Ford escapes and gets the militia to arrest William and take him to jail. Anthony visits William in jail. William tells Anthony he is a free man. William tells Guli that he wants to give up his American Dream and let Pennsylvania go. Guli makes him promise to continue to fight for his land and his dream and return to America. William, Guli, Anthony, Mary, Ford, Lord Baltimore and the Settlers dream of a truly Perfect City.

== Historical background ==
William Penn (1644–1718) was born in the City of London and brought up outside the city. William was well educated and studied law. As a child he had smallpox He was expelled from Christ Church, Oxford for his anarchic thinking. After William Penn joined the Quaker movement, he was disowned by his influential father, Admiral William Penn, and thrown out of the familial home. At the time, Quakerism was considered a threat to the royalist foundations of English society. Nevertheless, Penn received land from the Crown in lieu of a debt owed to his father. It was on this land that Penn set up his alternative colony of Quakers. The name "Pennsylvania" was coined by the King. In 1682, Penn arrived in America, only to return to England two years later in order to be with his family and support the Quaker cause back home. He had signed over the American territories to his advisor, Philip Ford, and as he was faced with mounting debt, found it difficult to resolve his finances himself. He died 1718 in Berkshire.
