= Amit Varma (writer) =

Indian writer and podcaster

- Notable work: India Uncut
- Awards: Bastiat Prize for Journalism (2007, 2015)

Amit Varma is a writer and podcaster based in Mumbai.

In 2008, his first novel My friend, Sancho was nominated to the longlist for the Man Asian Literary Prize 2008. In April 2009, he was named by BusinessWeek magazine in its India's 50 Most Powerful People 2009 list, for his blog India Uncut.

== Career ==
Amit Varma has worked in advertising, television and journalism, and has written for publications like The Guardian, The Wall Street Journal and Wisden Cricketers' Almanack. He was a Managing Editor of Cricinfo India. The editor of Pragati, an online magazine, Amit Varma also hosts a podcast, The Seen and the Unseen, on public policy, economics and behavioural science. He also cohosts another weekly podcast, Everything is Everything, with Ajay Shah that follows a more relaxed format and focuses on a wide range of topics which are considered to be contemporary.

== Awards ==
In October 2007, Varma won the 2007 Bastiat Prize for Journalism, which aims to honor writers "whose work cleverly and wittily promotes the institutions of the free society". He won the prize again in 2015.

- Bastiat Prize (2007, 2015)

== See also ==
- List of Indian writers
