= Dean Alfange =

American politician (1897–1989)

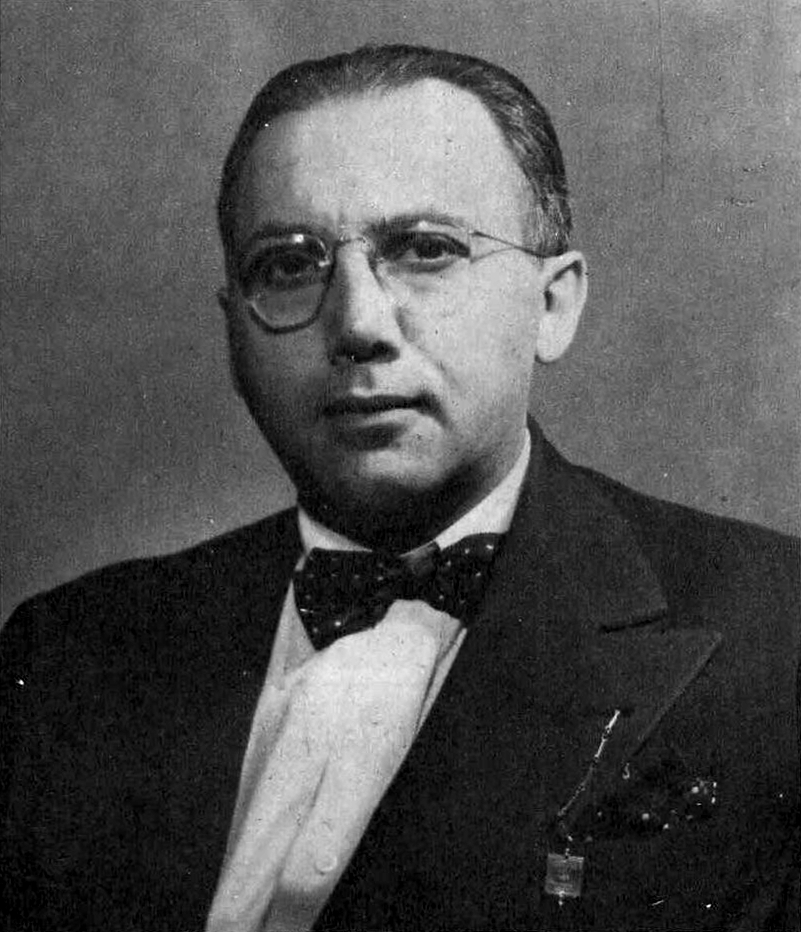
- Alfange c. 1942

Chairman of the New York State Quarter Horse Racing Commission
- In office 1970–1975 Serving with Matthew Blei and Richard A. Cerosky
- Governor: Nelson Rockefeller

Deputy New York State Attorney General

Personal details
- Born: December 2, 1897 Constantinople, Ottoman Empire
- Died: October 24, 1989 (aged 91) Manhattan, New York City, United States
- Party: American Labor; Liberal; Democratic
- Spouse: Thalia Perry
- Education: Hamilton College; Columbia University Law School
- Occupation: Politician
- Profession: Attorney

Military service
- Allegiance: USA
- Branch/service: United States Army
- Battles/wars: World War I

Dean Alfange (December 2, 1897 – October 24, 1989) was an American politician who held nominations and appointments from a number of parties, including the Democratic Party, the Republican Party, the American Labor Party, and the Liberal Party of New York, of which he was a founding member. Born in the Ottoman Empire to two native Greek parents, Alfange remained involved in Greek-American organizations for much of his life, as well as activist Zionist groups.

He was a prominent liberal legal commentator who supported the notion of judicial activism and a Living Constitution. He ran for a number of offices, including Governor of New York. He also ran for the United States House of Representatives, but lost again. He is well remembered for a short piece he wrote entitled either "An American's Creed" or simply "My Creed". The Creed espouses the ideas of self-reliance and freedom.

== Life ==
=== Early life and education ===
Alfange was born Constantine Alflangi in Constantinople in the Ottoman Empire, to two ethnic Greek parents. His parents moved to New York in 1902, where they raised him in Utica, New York. He graduated from Utica Free Academy in 1918, and joined the United States Army during World War I.

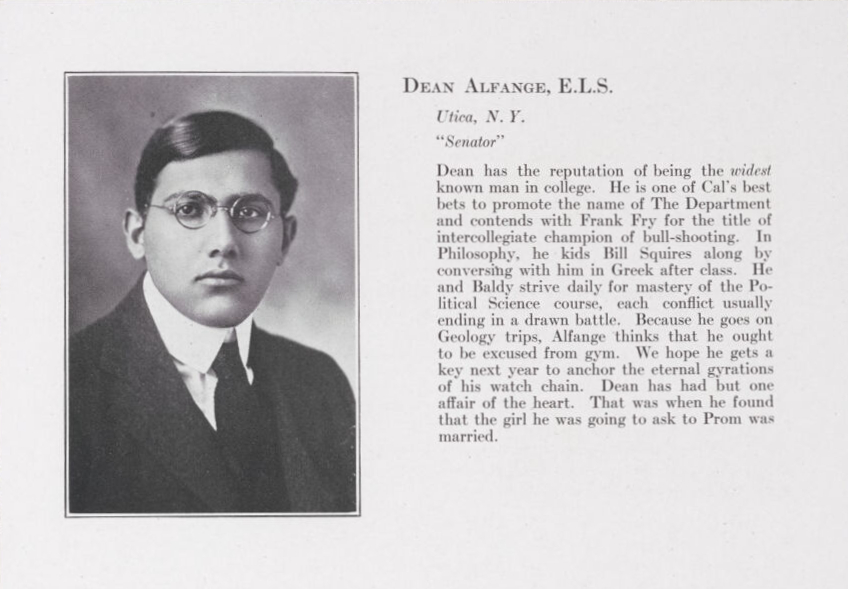
Alfange in the Hamilton College yearbook, 1922

After the war, he attended Hamilton College and graduated in 1922 with honors in philosophy, where he was a member of Phi Beta Kappa Society. Alfange remained active at the college, and when he received the Theodore Roosevelt Memorial Award for his book The Supreme Court and the National Will, he donated the prize to Hamilton College, establishing the ongoing Dean Alfange Essay Award, given to two students each year for essays on American constitutional government. He received a juris doctor from Columbia University Law School and became a lawyer in Manhattan.

=== Later life ===
He was married to Thalia Perry, with whom he had one child, Dean Alfange Jr., who went on to become a professor of political science at the University of Massachusetts. Alfange died October 24, 1989, in Manhattan from cancer.

== Legal career ==
Alfange received his degree from Columbia University Law School, and was admitted to the American Bar Association in 1925. He criticized the United States Supreme Court for its treatment of New Deal programs, urging they adopt a more progressive attitude towards the policies. He contended that the programs should not be evaluated solely on their legality, but on their possible moral and economic effects, as well as public perception at the time. He supported Truman's notion of a Living Constitution.

Later in his political career, Alfange served as the Deputy New York State Attorney General.

== Political career ==
=== Democratic Party ===
In 1940, Franklin Delano Roosevelt made Alfange chairman of the Democratic foreign-language speakers' bureau of his third election campaign. In 1941, he received the nomination for the United States Congress running out of the Upper East Side, then known as the Silk Stocking District, but lost to Joseph C. Baldwin, receiving 16,690 votes.

=== American Labor Party ===
Alfange served as head of the American Labor Party for several years in the late 1930s. In 1942, he received the nomination for Governor of New York. Though he received the nomination, the American Labor Party only officially fielded a candidate after Sen. James Mead, the man they had backed for the Democratic nomination, lost to John J. Bennett Jr. in the primary. Mayor of New York City Fiorello La Guardia supported Alfange in this election. Alfange finishing in third place with 409,047 votes, or about 9.7 percent of votes cast. With this figure, Alfange garnered more votes than any other American Labor candidate ever had or would again in a state-wide election; these votes were accused of splitting the liberal vote and thus playing a large role in Thomas E. Dewey's victory, however, Dewey won with a majority, garnering 52% of the vote.

=== Liberal Party ===
Alfange led a walkout against the American Labor Party in 1944, when pro and anti-Communist factions within the organization came into increased conflict. This walkout led to the formation of the Liberal Party of New York.

=== Republican ===
Governor Nelson A. Rockefeller named Alfange head of the New York State Racing and Wagering Board in the early 1970s. He served until Hugh L. Carey abolished the board in 1975.

== Activism ==
Alfange served in a number of activist and ethnic organizations, including heading the American Hellenic Educational Progressive Association, an organization for the advancement of Greek-Americans. He also served as president of La Guardia Memorial House, a settlement house, for more than 40 years.

Alfange headed the Zionist organization "Committee to Arm the Jewish State", a group that sought to end arms embargoes against Zionist groups working to create Israel before independence. He also served as the chairman of the Emergency Committee to Save the Jewish People of Europe, a group that sought to rescue victims of the then ongoing Holocaust. Through this organizations, Alfange urged that it was a Christian's moral and religious duty to help Jews victimized by the Nazis.

== An American's Creed ==
Alfange is remembered for a short statement he wrote in the 1950s entitled "An American's Creed" or simply "My Creed". The creed originally appeared in This Week magazine, and a condensed version appeared in Reader's Digest in both the October 1952 and January 1954 issues. The Freedoms Foundation at Valley Forge gave Alfange an award for the composition in 1952.

"I do not choose to be a common man. It is my right to be uncommon. I seek to develop whatever talents God gave me—not security. I do not wish to be a kept citizen, humbled and dulled by having the state look after me. I want to take the calculated risk; to dream and to build, to fail and to succeed. I refuse to barter incentive for a dole. I prefer the challenges of life to the guaranteed existence; the thrill of fulfillment to the stale calm of utopia. I will not trade freedom for beneficence nor my dignity for a handout. I will never cower before any earthly master nor bend to any threat. It is my heritage to stand erect, proud and unafraid; to think and act myself, enjoy the benefit of my creations and to face the world boldly and say – 'This, with God's help, I have done.' All this is what it means to be an American."

== Bibliography ==
- The Supreme Court and the National Will. New York City: Doubleday, Doran. 1937. p. 297.
