= Ross Clark (journalist) =

British journalist and author

Ross Clark (born 12 September 1966) is a British journalist and author whose work has appeared in The Spectator, Daily Telegraph, The Times and other publications. He is the author of several books, including How to Label a Goat: the silly Rules and Regulations that are strangling Britain and The Great Before, a novel which satirised the pessimism of the Green movement. He is a frequent critic of British government policy, especially on its interventions in the housing market and net zero emissions strategy.

== Early life ==
Clark was born in Worcester and brought up in East Kent, where he attended the Simon Langton Grammar School for Boys. He studied at Trinity Hall, Cambridge.

== Career ==
In 1989, Clark won The Spectator Young Writers Award, part of the prize for which – a lunch — he later claimed not to have received. He established himself as a freelance journalist, with his work appearing in The Daily Telegraph and Sunday Telegraph, the Daily Express, the Daily Mail and The Mail on Sunday and The Times, where he frequently writes the Thunderer column. His work is strongly associated with libertarianism and free market economics, writing the "Banned Wagon" and "Globophobia" columns in The Spectator. In 2013, he was co-winner of the Bastiat Prize run by the Reason Foundation. He was also shortlisted for the prize in 2004.

In 2010, shortly before the general election, he co-wrote, with Neil O'Brien, The Renewal of Government, the manifesto of Policy Exchange, a think tank strongly associated with David Cameron. However, he later showed hostility towards some Coalition policies; in a piece in The Times in March 2013, he accused the Chancellor, George Osborne, by means of a plan to underwrite £130 billion of mortgage debt, of forcing the taxpayer to take the same speculative risks which had caused the banking crisis.

In 2012, Clark's musical Shot at Dawn was performed as a workshop at the Etcetera Theatre in Camden. The musical was a success and was later restaged as a full-scale professional production in 2014 at Upstairs at The Gatehouse in Highgate, north London and the Mumford Theatre, Cambridge. He also wrote, with Martin Coslett, The Perfect City, which was performed at the Etcetera Theatre in March 2013. In 2015, the musical Shot at Dawn was renamed The White Feather and performed at the Union Theatre in Southwark.

== Personal life ==
He lives in Reach, Cambridgeshire. In 2011, he was elected to be a member of the village's parish council.

== Books ==
- Clark, Ross (1996). Cambridgeshire (Pimlico County History Guides). Pimlico. ISBN 978-0712674676.
- Clark, Ross (2005). The Great Before: A Satire. Ross Clark. ISBN 978-0955149900.
- Clark, Ross (2006). How to Label a Goat: The silly rules and regulations that are strangling Britain. Harriman House. ISBN 978-1897597958.
- Clark, Ross (2007). The Road to Southend Pier: One man's struggle against the Surveillance Society (1st ed.). Harriman House. ISBN 978-1905641444.
- Clark, Ross (2009). The Road to Southend Pier: One man's struggle against the Surveillance Society (2nd ed.). Encounter Books. ISBN 978-1594032486.
- Clark, Ross (2012). A Broom Cupboard of One's Own: The housing crisis and how to solve it (eBook). Harriman House. ISBN 978-0857192967.
- Clark, Ross (2017). War Against Cash: the plot to empty your wallet and own your financial future - and why you must fight it. Harriman House. ISBN 978-0857196255.
- Clark, Ross (2020). The Denial: a satirical novel of climate change. Lume Books. ISBN 978-1839012105.
- Clark, Ross (2023). Not Zero: How an Irrational Target Will Impoverish You, Help China (and Won't Even Save the Planet). Forum Press. ISBN 978-1800752429.
