= 1942 New York state election =

- November 3, 1942

The 1942 New York state election was held on November 3, 1942, to elect the governor, the lieutenant governor, the state comptroller, the attorney general and two U.S. Representatives At-large, as well as all members of the New York State Assembly and the New York State Senate.

== Nominations ==
The Industrial Government state convention met on April 5, and nominated again Aaron M. Orange for governor. They also nominated Bronko Papadopolis, of Buffalo, for lieutenant governor; O. Martin Olson for comptroller; and Eric Hass for attorney general.

The Socialist state convention met on June 21 at 303 Fourth Avenue in New York City, and nominated Prof. Coleman B. Cheney for governor; Samuel H. Friedman for lieutenant governor; Joseph G. Glass for attorney general; the Rev. Herman J. Hahn for comptroller; and Miss Layle Lane, an African-American teacher, writer and lecturer, and Amicus Most, an engineer of New Rochelle, for the at-large Congress seats. The petition to nominate these candidates was filed on August 31 with the Secretary of State.

The Democratic state convention met on August 20. Influenced by James A. Farley, the convention nominated State Attorney General John J. Bennett Jr., for governor on the first ballot with 623 votes against 393 for U.S. Senator James M. Mead, the candidate favored by President Franklin D. Roosevelt. They re-nominated three incumbents: Lieutenant Governor Charles Poletti, Comptroller Joseph V. O'Leary, and Representative at-large Matthew J. Merritt; and completed the ticket with State Solicitor General Henry Epstein for attorney general; and Flora D. Johnson for the other at-large House seat.

The American Labor state convention met on August 22, but instead of Bennett (or Mead), they nominated Tammany man Dean Alfange for governor. They re-nominated Comptroller O'Leary, an American Laborite who had been appointed by Governor Herbert H. Lehman to fill the vacancy caused by the death of Morris S. Tremaine. They endorsed Democrats Poletti, Merritt, and Johnson; and completed the ticket with Alexander Kahn for attorney general.

The Republican state convention met on August 24 at Saratoga Springs, New York. They nominated 1938 candidate Thomas E. Dewey for Governor again, and adjourned. On August 25 they nominated Thomas W. Wallace for lieutenant governor; Frank C. Moore for comptroller; Nathaniel L. Goldstein for attorney general; and Charles Muzzicato and Winifred C. Stanley for Representative at-large.

The Communist Party filed a nominating petition for their candidates on August 28. They nominated Israel Amter for governor; Frank Herron, of Buffalo, for lieutenant governor; Benjamin J. Davis Jr., of New York City, for attorney general; Fred Briehl, a dairy farmer of Wallkill, for comptroller; and Elizabeth Gurley Flynn and Robert Minor for Representative at-large. Herron, Briehl, Davis, and Minor withdrew from the ticket, and Davis was then nominated for Representative at-large, leaving three gaps on the ticket.

== Result ==
Republicans won almost all statewide elective offices, only the incumbent Democratic Congressman Merritt was re-elected. The incumbents Poletti and O'Leary were defeated. Dewey beat the Democrat John J. Bennett Jr. by 647,628 votes while Lt. Governor Thomas W. Wallace beat Charles Poletti by only 54,303. The primary difference in the two races was that Poletti, like Matthew J. Merritt who won his race as well as Flora D. Johnson and Joseph V. O'Leary, who each lost by a slightly wider margin than Poletti, had the support of approximately 400,000 voters on the American Labor ticket while Bennett lost these votes to Dean Alfange, the American Labor nominee for governor.

This was the last election of U.S. Representatives at-large from New York. In 1944 New York's Congressional district map was redrawn to add two more districts. All U.S. Representatives from New York have been elected in individual districts ever since.

1942 state election results
| Office | Republican ticket | | Democratic ticket | | American Labor ticket | | Communist ticket | | Socialist ticket | | Industrial Government ticket | |
|---|---|---|---|---|---|---|---|---|---|---|---|---|
| Governor | Thomas E. Dewey | 2,148,546 | John J. Bennett Jr. | 1,501,039 | Dean Alfange | 403,626 | Israel Amter | 45,220 | Coleman B. Cheney | 21,911 | Aaron M. Orange | 3,496 |
| Lieutenant Governor | Thomas W. Wallace | 2,021,285 | Charles Poletti | 1,555,298 | Charles Poletti | 411,684 | (none) | | Samuel H. Friedman | 25,192 | Bronko Papadopolis | 3,295 |
| Comptroller | Frank C. Moore | 2,012,380 | Joseph V. O'Leary | 1,526,915 | Joseph V. O'Leary | 383,808 | (none) | | Herman J. Hahn | 23,968 | O. Martin Olson | 3,915 |
| Attorney General | Nathaniel L. Goldstein | 1,911,747 | Henry Epstein | 1,538,415 | Alexander Kahn | 335,369 | (none) | | Joseph G. Glass | 31,957 | Eric Hass | 7,570 |
| Member of the U.S. House of Representatives (at-large) | Charles Muzzicato | 1,888,925 | Matthew J. Merritt | 1,577,163 | Matthew J. Merritt | 334,951 | Benjamin J. Davis Jr. | 52,002 | Amicus Most | 19,294 | | |
| Member of the U.S. House of Representatives (at-large) | Winifred C. Stanley | 1,965,794 | Flora D. Johnson | 1,536,432 | Flora D. Johnson | 338,031 | Elizabeth Gurley Flynn | 50,305 | Layle Lane | 22,361 | | |

Obs.:

- The vote for governor is used to define ballot access, for automatic access are necessary 50,000 votes.

== See also ==
- New York gubernatorial elections

== Sources ==
- Official Result: DEWEY'S PLURALITY OFFICIALLY 647,628; State Board of Canvassers Certifies Election Results at Meeting in Albany; RECORD FOR REPUBLICAN; Up-State Margin Also Party Peak in Governorship Race; Poletti Lost by 54,303 in NYT on December 15, 1942 (subscription required)

New York Red Book 1943 with correction in Epstein Attorney General total for misprint in Richmond County total. Correction consistent with total reported by NYV Board of Elections. Correction added 18,000 votes to Epstein total
