= Nathaniel L. Goldstein =

New York politician and Attorney General (1896-1981)

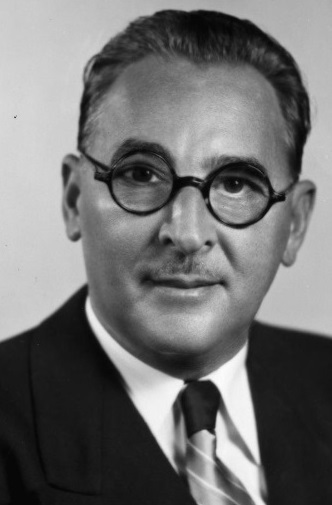
- New York Law School photo, circa 1952

57th Attorney General of New York
- In office January 1, 1943 – December 31, 1954
- Governor: Thomas E. Dewey
- Preceded by: John J. Bennett Jr.
- Succeeded by: Jacob Javits

Personal details
- Born: 9 June 1896 New York City, U.S.
- Died: 24 March 1981 (aged 84) New York City, U.S.
- Party: Republican
- Spouse: Etta May Brown
- Children: 2
- Profession: Attorney

Military service
- Allegiance: United States
- Branch/service: United States Army
- Years of service: 1918

Nathaniel Lawrence Goldstein (June 9, 1896 – March 24, 1981) was New York State Attorney General from 1943 to 1954, paralleling the three terms of Governor Thomas E. Dewey. A Republican, Goldstein equaled the twelve-year tenure of his Democratic predecessor John J. Bennett Jr. Since the office's creation in 1777, the only New York Attorneys General who served longer were Louis Lefkowitz (1957–78) and Robert Abrams (1978–94).

== Early years ==
A native of New York City, Nathaniel Goldstein was born on the Lower East Side of Manhattan, to parents of Jewish descent. When he was six years old his family moved to Brooklyn where, as a high school student, Goldstein joined Sigma Omega Psi fraternity at New York University. he excelled in debating and was inspired by Brooklyn Assemblyman Charles C. Lockwood who attended one of the debates. Lockwood hired the young man as an assistant in his law firm, while encouraging him to study at night and later to attend New York University, where he was a member of the Sigma Omega Psi fraternity.

While a student at New York University, Goldstein also worked as an accountant and, after graduating in 1915, went on to receive his law degree from New York Law School in 1918. With America's participation in World War I in full progress, a few weeks later, he was an infantry private on a troop ship bound for Europe. After World War I, he began to practice law with Assemblyman Lockwood and others, including Republican statesman Henry Stimson, who later served as Franklin D. Roosevelt's World War II Secretary of War. Through the 1920s and the 1930s Goldstein's stature grew in importance as he rose from being a legal aide in state assembly committees to a political advisor in housing and other New York City affairs.

== New York State Attorney General ==
In the first full year of United States participation in World War II, the New York State Republican Party chose as its 1942 nominees for Governor and Attorney General, the 40-year-old Thomas E. Dewey and the 46-year-old Nathaniel L. Goldstein. The ticket proved victorious in November and both Dewey and Goldstein went on to win two more times, in 1946 and 1950. As he began his first term, Goldstein realized that twelve years of one-party control of the Attorney General's office resulted in abuse of the patronage system, with political appointees whose annual salaries exceeded $10,000 not showing up for work, while receiving their paychecks by mail. The actual work of the office was being done by assistants who were making $2000 per year. One of his first acts was to equalize salaries and insist on a full day's work from all members of his staff.

== Fighting the Klan and illegal drugs ==
Much of his time was consumed with rent-control litigation. However, another long-investigated and much-publicized case, which he personally supervised, had as its goal the withdrawal of the New York State charter for the Ku Klux Klan, which the organization had managed to clandestinely acquire in 1923.

Goldstein had one of his agents join the Klan and come to know the secret society's inner workings, while uncovering its propagators and organizers. He was quoted in a statement issued by the office of New York Attorney General, that "the principles of hate, intolerance, bigotry and violence must be stamped out" as he transmitted to the Federal Bureau of Investigation 1100 names of members of the Ku Klux Klan and the Hitler-resurgent German-American Bund. On July 29, 1946, the New York State Supreme Court revoked the Klan's charter.

The final years of Goldstein's tenure were occupied with fighting the growing spread of illegal narcotics, which he called "socially contagious". He devoted numerous task forces to the problem and lobbied Congress to provide for enforced treatment of those who become addicted. He was also deeply involved in international drug control through his service as advisor to the United States negotiators in the United Nations committees dealing with the matter.

== Philanthropy/affiliations ==
Throughout his public life, he was a leading voice in philanthropic endeavors through his participation in United Jewish Appeal, National Conference of Christians and Jews, Brooklyn Hebrew Orphan Asylum, Israel Bonds, Hebrew University of Jerusalem bond organization, Willkie Memorial of Freedom House, Pace University and New York Law School.

In his final years he acted as special counsel for the law firm Finley, Kumble, Wagner, Heine & Underberg. He was a trustee of the Fletcher School of Law and Diplomacy and chairman of the board of overseers of the Harry S. Truman Research Institute for the Advancement of Peace at the Hebrew University of Jerusalem.

== Death ==
Goldstein died at his residence in Manhattan of a heart attack, aged 84. He was survived by his wife, the former Etta May Brown and two children, Steven Goldstein and Lois Lowenstein.

== See also ==
- List of Jewish American jurists

== General Reference ==
- Nathaniel Lawrence Goldstein Papers, 1922-1973. M.E. Grenander Department of Special Collections and Archives, University Libraries, University at Albany, State University of New York (hereafter referred to as the Goldstein Papers).

Party political offices
Preceded by Arthur V. McDermott	Republican nominee for Attorney General of New York; 1942, 1946, 1950	Succeeded by Jacob Javits
Legal offices
Preceded by John J. Bennett Jr.	New York Attorney General; 1943–1954	Succeeded by Jacob K. Javits
