= Lazar Fogelman =

Yiddish journalist and newspaper editor

Lazar Fogelman (May 27, 1888 - September 13, 1970) was an American journalist and editor. He was the editor-in-chief of the Jewish Daily Forward between 1962 and 1968.

== Biography ==
Lazar Fogelman was born in Nyasizh, Belarus, where his father was a teacher. He was educated at Imperial University Warsaw and the Psychoneurological Institute in Petrograd. He began his literary career in Russian before switching to writing in Yiddish . In America, he received a law degree from Fordham University Law School.

Fogelman began writing for the Forward in 1927. He was the managing editor of the paper between 1952 and 1962. Following the resignation of Harry Rogoff, Fogelman became the editor of the Forward. Elie Wiesel worked with Fogelman at the paper during the 1960s, recalling him as "a dreamer with a penchant for sudden outbursts of humor".

== Bibliography ==
- Pavel Akselrod (New York: Jewish Socialist Union, 1928)
- Buker T. Vashington (New York: Workmen's Circle, 1930)
- Unzer ring, geshikhte fun dem arbiter-ring (New York: Workmen's Circle, 1931)
