= Jodi Rudoren =

American journalist and editor

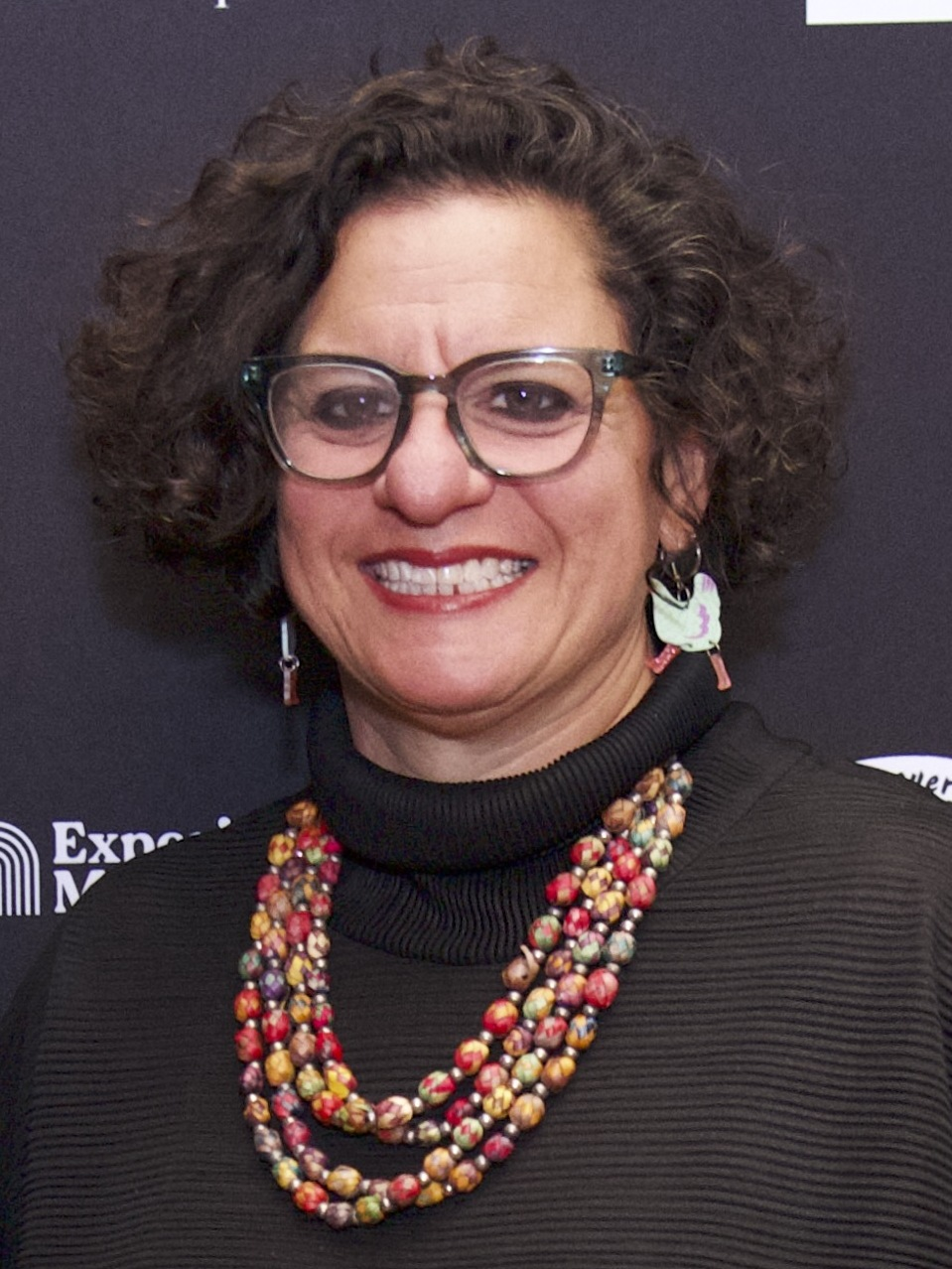
- Rudoren in 2024
- Born: Jodi Wilgoren; November 30, 1970 (age 55)
- Education: Yale University
- Occupation: Journalist
- Spouse: Gary Ruderman (m. 2004)

Jodi Rudoren (née Wilgoren; born November 30, 1970) is an American journalist and Editorial Director of Newsletters at The New York Times.

== Bibliography ==
Rudoren was a reporter and editor for The New York Times for many years, and was the newspaper's Bureau chief in Jerusalem from 2012 through 2015. She joined the masthead as Associate Managing Editor for Audience Strategy in 2018. She had previously been the Times' Chicago bureau chief, a Times correspondent on the 2004 presidential campaign, and served as deputy editor on the Metro desk, where she created the Sunday Metropolitan section. Rudoren was executive producer of the multimedia series One in 8 Million, which won an Emmy Award. She was named Editor-in-Chief of The Forward in July 2019 and assumed the role in September 2019. In March 2025, The New York Times announced she will be returning to the paper as editorial director of newsletters.

Rudoren began her career under the byline Jodi Wilgoren, her birth name. Before joining The New York Times, she had worked for a few years at the Orange County edition of The Los Angeles Times. She married the former Gary Ruderman in 2004 and in 2006 the two merged their surnames.

Rudoren was raised in Newton, Massachusetts and graduated cum laude from Yale University in 1992 where she was Managing Editor of Yale Daily News. She is a resident of Montclair, New Jersey. She serves on the board for the Fuller Project, a nonprofit journalism organization that reports on the issues that most impact women in the US and abroad.
