= Banyan Drive =

Street in Hilo, Hawaii, United States

- Hilo Walk of Fame
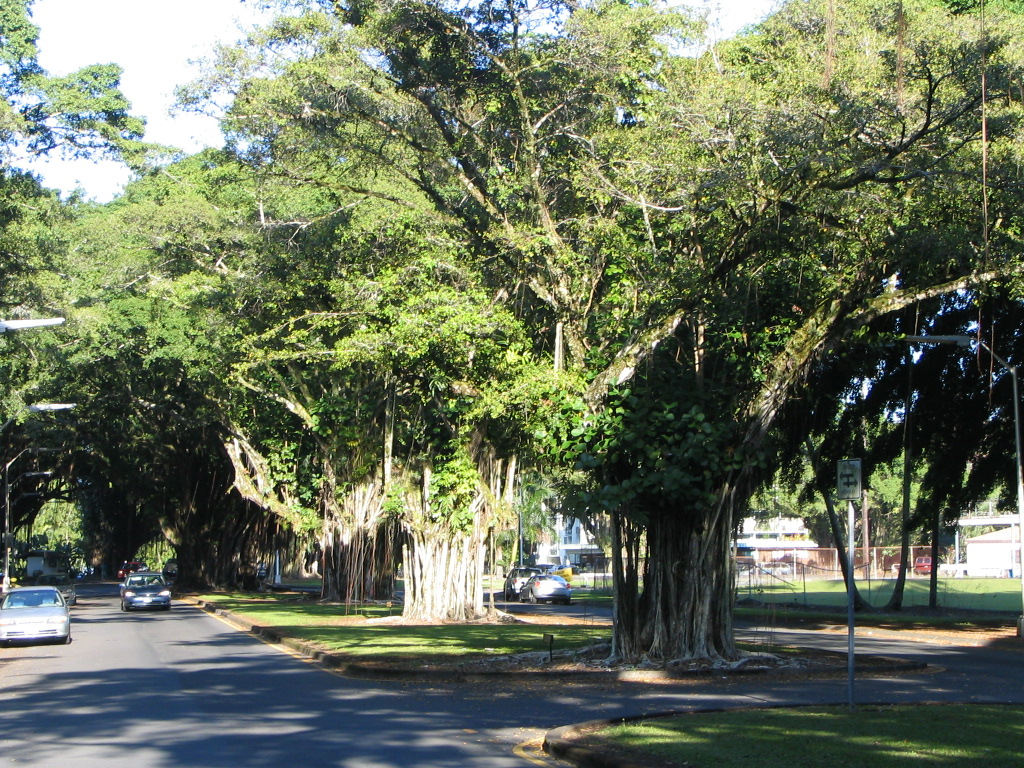
- Banyan Drive in 2007
- Interactive map of Banyan Drive
- Namesake: numerous Banyan trees planted by celebrities
- Coordinates: 19°43′32″N 155°3′48″W

Banyan Drive is a tree-lined street at the shoreline of Hilo, Hawaii. It is known as the "Hilo Walk of Fame" for the banyan trees planted by celebrities. These trees have withstood several tsunamis that have devastated the town in the past. Various dignitaries have been invited to plant a banyan tree on it.

== History ==
Parks and attractions near Hilo Bay and downtown Hilo, Hawaii
- Points of interest
- Parks and open spaces
- Transportation
1 Lyman House Memorial Museum
2 Haili Church
3 Kalākaua Park / East Hawaii Cultural Center
4 Pacific Tsunami Museum
5 Moʻoheau County Park (Hele-On Bus Terminal) / S. Hata Building / Mokupāpapa Discovery Center
6 Russell Carroll Soccer Fields
7 Aupuni Center / County of Hawaiʻi offices
8 Hilo Bayfront Beach Park
9 Wailoa River State Recreation Area / Waiākea Pond
10 Coconut Island / Moku Ola
11 Queen Liliʻuokalani Park and Gardens / Banyan Drive
12 Grand Naniloa Hotel / Naniloa Golf Course
13 Reed's Bay Beach Park
14 Hoʻolulu Complex (Merrie Monarch Festival site): Afook-Chinen Civic Auditorium · Aunty Sally Kaleohano's Luʻau Hale · Edith Kanakaʻole Stadium · 'Sparky' Kawamoto Swim Stadium · Walter Victor Baseball Complex · Francis Wong Stadium
15 Hilo Harbor
16 Hilo International Airport

The drive circles the Waiakea Peninsula, near Hilo International Airport, and boasts the largest hotels on the eastern side of the Big Island. It is located in Liliʻuokalani Gardens, and a small footbridge leads to Moku Ola, also known as Coconut Island.

=== Celebrity planting ===
In 1933, several community members decided that it would be a good idea to have celebrities plant banyan tree saplings along the peninsula. In 1934, with the arrival of President Franklin Roosevelt in Hilo, it was decided to build a drive through the trees, then only of crushed coral. At the time, the peninsula hosted the Hilo Yacht club and several homes. In late 1933, Cecil B. DeMille was on the island filming "Four Frightened People". Several of the actors along with Mr. and Mrs. DeMille, all planted trees in their own honor. According to records, 8 trees were planted in October 1933. In addition to the movie stars, one tree was also planted by the famous baseball player, George Herman "Babe" Ruth.

Planting of trees by celebrities continued with an additional 10 trees planted in 1934, 15 in 1935, 6 in 1936, 5 in 1937, 4 in 1938. Two trees were planted in 1941, one in 1952 by Senator Richard Nixon, and two in 1972 by Pat Nixon, one to replace the tree planted by her husband which was lost in a storm and the other to honor her as first lady. In 1991 Polly Mooney replanted a tree lost to a tsunami honoring Civitan International leader Courtney Shropshire. Mrs. Mooney was also honored by being the first woman president of the previously male-dominated Civitan. The tree bears both their names.

=== Banyan Drive today ===
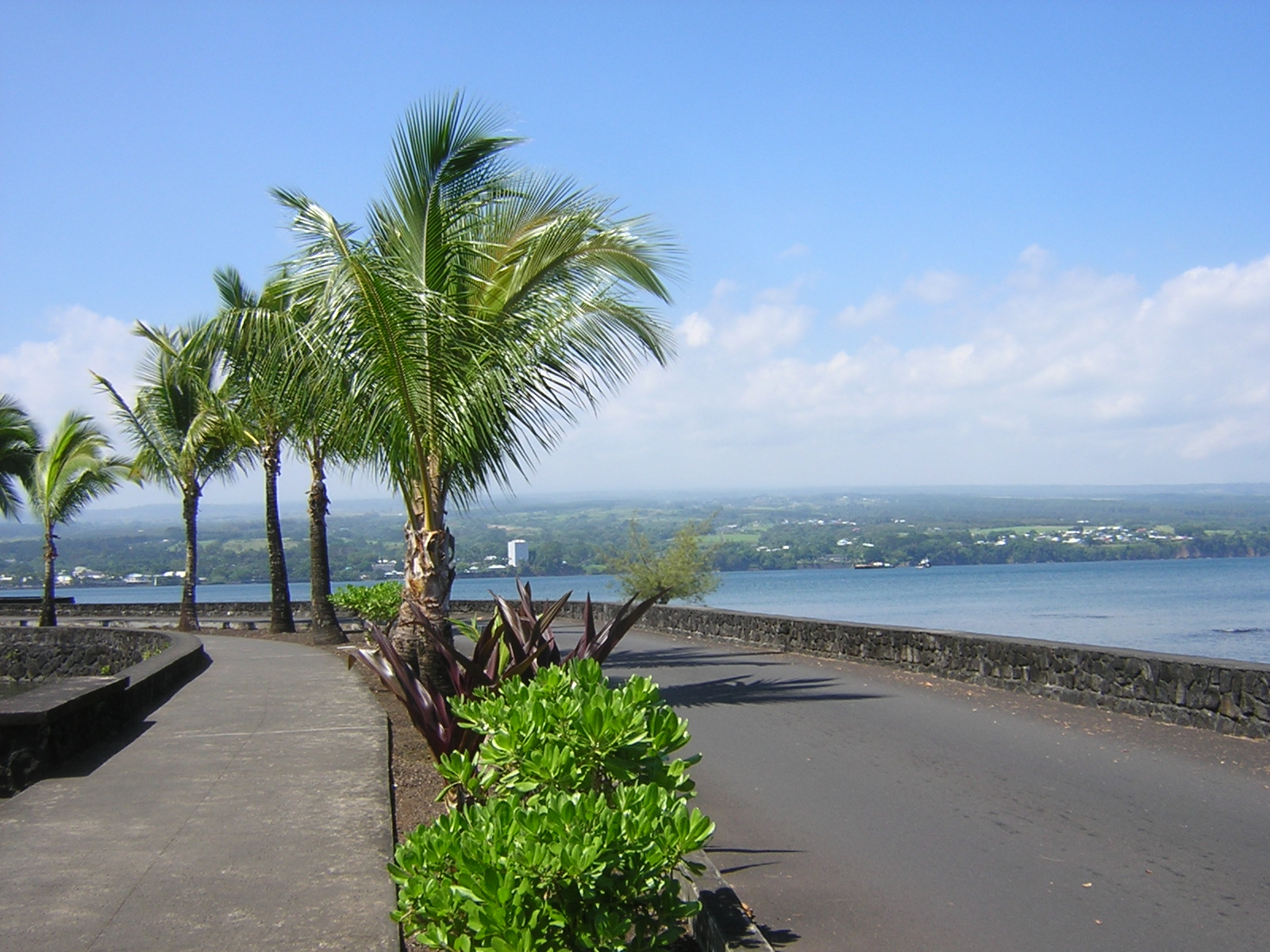
Palm trees on the coast near Banyan Drive

Some of the trees were lost due to the effects of tsunamis that once devastated the Hilo coastline. Fifty trees still line Banyan Drive, marked with wooden plaques. Several of the banyan trees in the adjoining golf course may have been planted by honorees.

Most of the trees still thrive along Banyan Drive, having grown into a thick canopy, making it popular for walking. The trees, which bear the names of the planters, honor movie stars, religious leaders, political leaders, famous authors, adventurers, and local Hawaiians.

=== Development on Banyan Drive ===
Banyan Drive is home to several hotels, apartment/condominium buildings, restaurants, and retail buildings. Hotels include:

- The Hilo Hawaiian Hotel.
- The Grand Naniloa Hotel.
- The Hilo Seaside Hotel.
- The Hilo Reeds Bay Hotel.

Restaurants include:

- Hilo Bay Cafe.
- Coconut Grill.
- Ponds Restaurant.
- Suisan Fish Market.

Some hotels and apartment buildings have recently faced financial problems and closures.

The Banyan Drive Redevelopment Agency has proposed new parks, a new cruise ship port, new commercial activity, and a new hotel. A bike trail connecting Banyan Drive to downtown Hilo has been built. Funds at the state and county level are being sought for redevelopment. Uncle Billy's one of the oldest hotels has been demolished and the site cleared for new development.

== Gallery ==
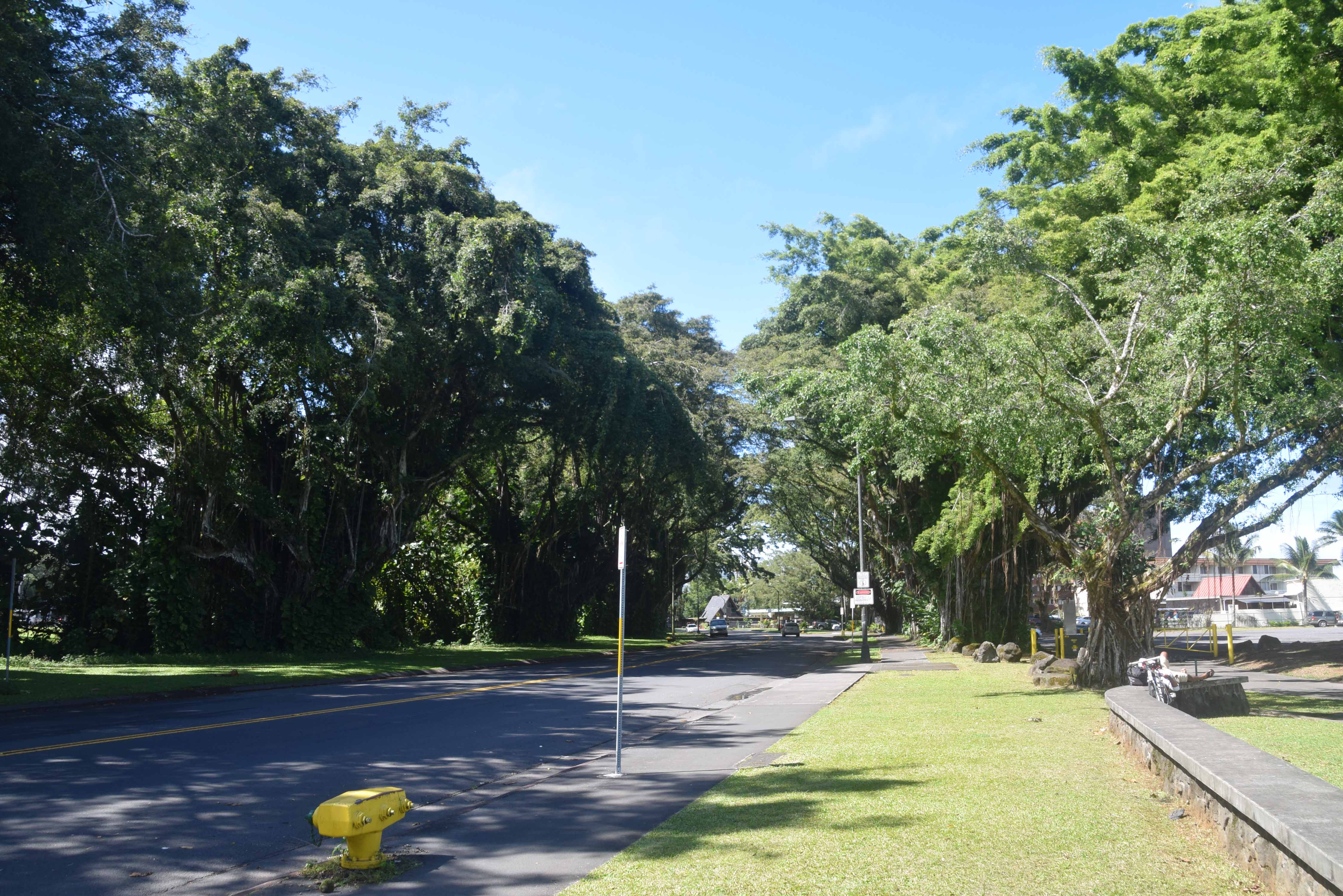
Banyan Drive, Hilo, Hawaii

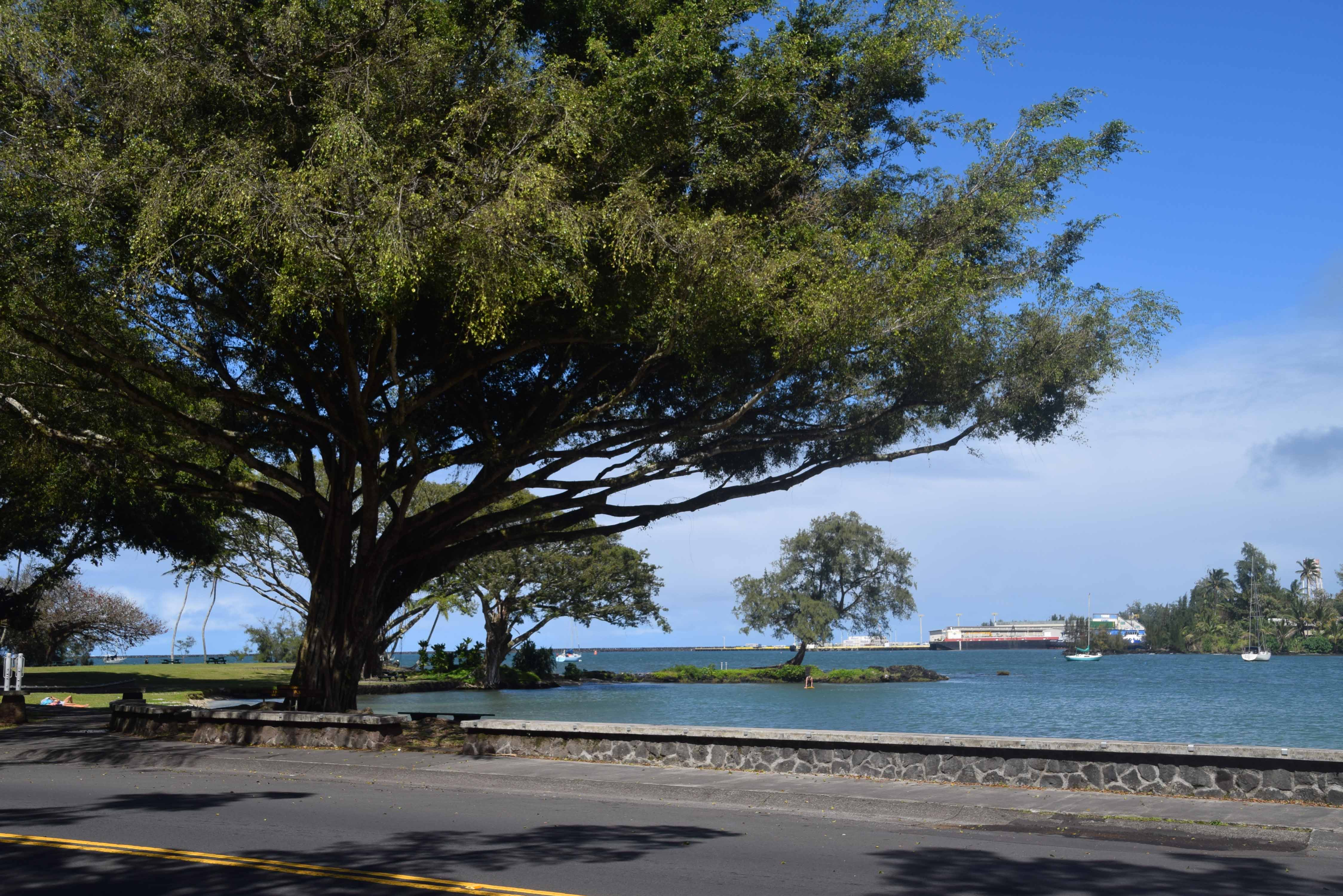
Banyan Drive, looking toward the Port of Hilo

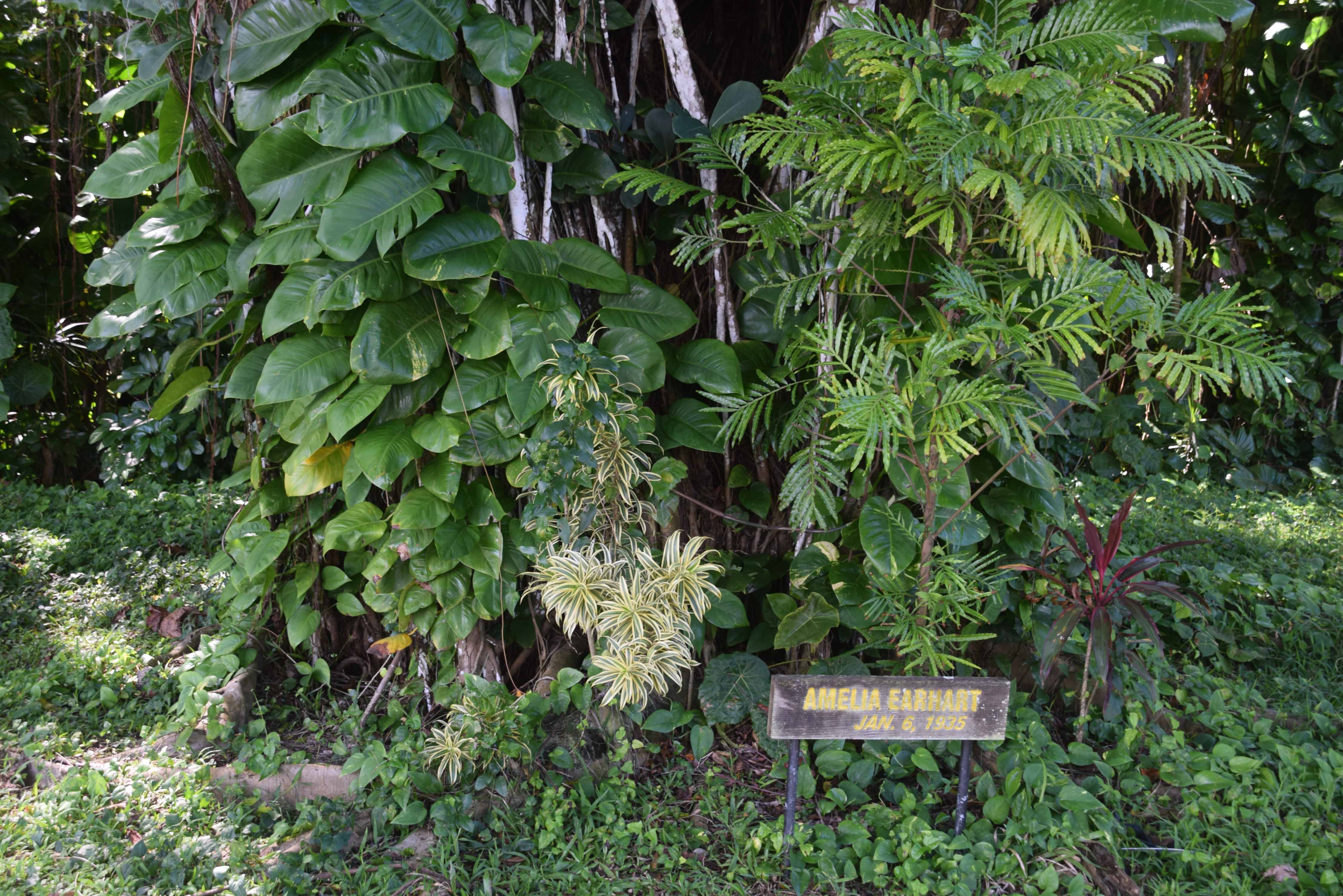
Banyan tree planted in 1935 by Amelia Earhart

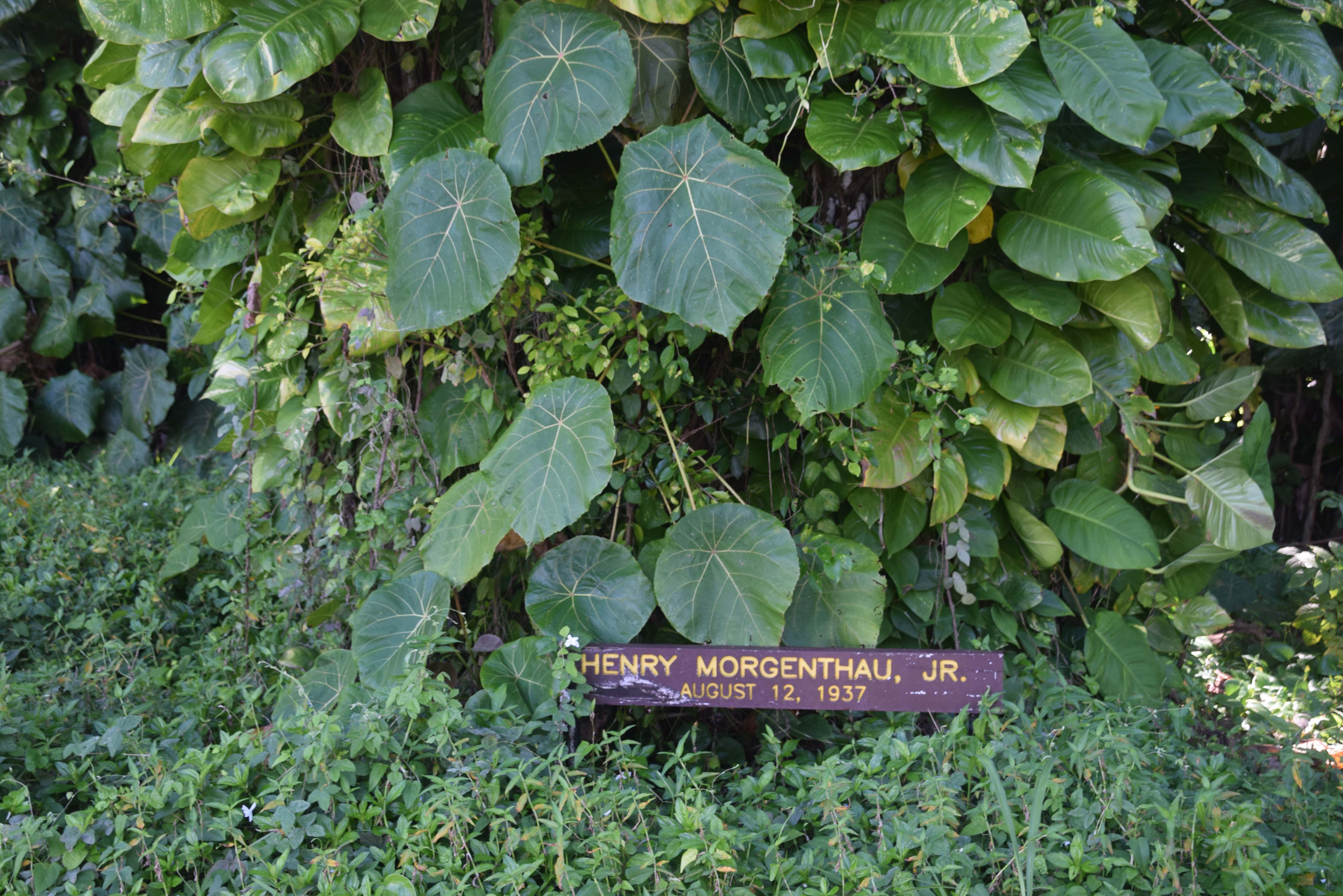
Banyan tree planted in 1937 by Henry Morgenthau Jr.

== Planters ==
=== Movie stars ===
Movie stars (and directors) include Cecil B. DeMille and his wife Constance, Mary Boland, William Gargan, Edna Best, Herbert Marshall, and Leo Carrillo.

=== Adventurers ===
Adventurers who planted trees include pilots Amelia Earhart and Knefler McGinnis, as well as Arctic and Antarctic explorer Lincoln Ellsworth.

=== Religious leaders ===
Religious leaders have been honored by planting banyans in Hilo. These include then-president of the Church of Jesus Christ of Latter-day Saints, Heber J. Grant; Dr. John Sonnenberg, Pacific area president of the Mormons; Roman Catholic Bishop Stephen Alencastre; Monshu of the Hongwanji Buddhists Kosho Ohtani; Japanese Christian Toyohiko Kagawa; International YMCA College President (then retired) Dr. Laurence L. Doggett; and Dr. Daniel A. Poling, once pastor of the Marble Collegiate Church.

Methodist leader Bishop Gerald Kennedy planted a tree along the drive, but it was not a banyan tree.

=== Politicians ===
Politicians that planted banyans include Franklin D. Roosevelt, Richard Nixon, Treasury Secretary Henry Morgenthau, War Secretary George Dern, Postmaster James Farley, National Guard Chief George Leach, Hawaii County Chairman Helene Hale, Hawaii County Chairman Samuel M. Spencer, Secretary of the Interior Oscar Chapman, and Hawaii Territorial Governor Oren Long.

=== Notable Hawaiians ===
Hawaiians were often honored on Arbor Day, celebrated in Hawaii on the first Friday of November. Residents of the Territory and later State of Hawai'i include Virginio A. Carvalho, Otto Rose, vulcanologist Dr. Thomas Jaggar, Hawaiian Princess Abigail Kawānanakoa, James McCandless, Dr. Grover Batten, David McHattie Forbes, Benjamin Bond (son of Hawaiian Missionary Elias Bond), hotelier William Kimi, and hotelier George Lycurgus. Father "Louis" Aloysius Borghouts founded the Father Louis Boys' Home for orphans and ran it for 36 years.

=== Other honorees ===
Other people honored by banyan tree planting include musician Louis "Satchmo" Armstrong, radio celebrity Arthur Godfrey, First Lady Pat Nixon, Supreme Court Justice Earl Warren, Eastern Star's William A. Duvall, Sr., American Legion's Ada Mucklestone and Ray Murphy, author Lewis Browne, Civitan's Courtney Shropshire and Polly Mooney Forestier, Philippine labor and cult leader Hilario Moncado, Boy Scout Executive James West, Cleveland College sociologist Henry Busch, authors Vicki Baum and Fannie Hurst, China's Premier Sun Fo, author and illustrator Hendrik Willem van Loon, Professor of Chinese culture P. C. Chang and cruise director of the RMS Franconia, Ross Hunt Skinner, local Filipino businessman and wife Gonzalo and Adela Manibog.

=== Trees planted in honor of others ===
Most banyan trees are planted by the person being honored, but some are planted in honor of other people. Some of these include a tree for King George V in honor of his silver jubilee, for Hawaiian Park Ranger Albert MacKenzie by his wife on Arbor Day, for Girl Scout founder Juliette Low by a local Girl Scout troop, and a tree for the Commonwealth of the Philippines by Rev. Yadao and the Shriners.
