= Metropolitan Chicago Healthcare Council =

The Metropolitan Chicago Healthcare Councill (MCHC) was a membership and service organization organized to advocate for member hospitals.

MCHC was composed of more than 140 hospitals and health care organizations in the Chicago metropolitan area.

The Council's members included hospitals, physician groups, nursing homes, outpatient treatment centers, insurers, medical schools and other health care-related organizations.

== History ==
The MCHC was founded in 1935.

In 2013, the MCHC started Land of Lincoln Health, a not-for-profit health insurer. In September 2014, Dan Yunker was named CEO of the company, replacing Kevin Scanlan.

In April 2015, MCHC announced plans to merge with the Illinois Hospital Association. The merger was completed in January 2016.
