= Junior Civitan International =

- Founded: 1927
- Purpose: Developmental Disabilities
- Location: Birmingham, Alabama
- Method: Community service through service clubs
- Members: 11,000
- Website: http://www.juniorcivitan.org

Junior Civitan International is a student-led service organization for middle and high school students. There are 11,000 Junior Civitan members in 400 clubs in North America, Africa, Asia, and Europe. It is the longest lasting project of its parent organization Civitan International.

== History ==
The first Junior Civitan club was formed in 1927 by a school teacher in Maine. Unaware of the existence of Civitan International, she created a group for her students that promoted good citizenship and called it Civitan. When members of Civitan International discovered that their organization's name was being used by another group, they reached an agreement which allowed the school club to call itself Junior Civitan. Also, Civitan International agreed to informally promote the creation of clubs for students around the country.

Several more Junior Civitan clubs formed across the country. In 1932, Civitan began to issue official charters to the Junior Civitan clubs. It was not until 1939 that Civitan International passed an official resolution to adopt the Junior Civitan program.

== Service Projects ==
On a local level, individual Junior Civitan clubs undertake various service projects which benefit their local communities. Examples of club events include raising money to prevent the use of child soldiers in Uganda and hosting events for people with intellectual disabilities. Clubs operate independently of the international organization or other clubs, leaving them free to participate in whatever service they deem appropriate.

While individual clubs are free to pursue their own projects, on an international level Junior Civitan is focused on service to the developmentally disabled. This emphasis was adopted in 1956. Many of Junior Civitans projects benefit the UAB Civitan International Research Center, the first institution of its kind to be focused solely on the research of developmental disabilities.

== International Events ==
=== Sno-Do ===
Sno-Do is one of Junior Civitan's most important fundraisers; it is held annually in Barrie, Ontario. The Governors of each district raise money to participate in a snowmobile ride through the Canadian countryside and participate in the Governors update led by the International Board. The event has raised more than $1.5 million for the research of developmental disabilities since its inception.

=== Dance-a-Thon ===
Dance-A-Thon is Junior Civitan's second most important fundraising event. Formerly held in Canada, the event was moved to Myrtle Beach, South Carolina. The event lasts for 12 hours, with participants following a specially devised menu to provide maximum energy. The Dance-A-Thon started in Oakville, Ontario, and for many years lasted 25 hours, usually ending with the song "Taking Care of Business." This fundraiser has generated over $1 million for the research of developmental disabilities at the UAB Civitan International Research Center.

=== International Convention ===
Junior Civitan holds an international convention once each year. Junior Civitans who attend the convention participate in international officer elections, business sessions, workshops, dances, and social activities. This event gives every member a chance to meet other people within the organization and begin planning activities for their clubs.
