= Shropshire (disambiguation) =

Shropshire is an English ceremonial county.

Shropshire may also refer to:

== Places ==
- Shropshire (district), a unitary authority, the area covered by Shropshire Council
- Shropshire (UK Parliament constituency), a former constituency

== People ==
- Adonis Shropshire, American producer
- Courtney Shropshire (1877–1965), American philanthropist
- Darrell Shropshire (born 1983), American football player
- Elmo Shropshire (born 1936), American singer
- Mike Shropshire (born 1942), American sportswriter
- Terilyn A. Shropshire, American movie and television editor

== Ships ==
- SS Shropshire, a passenger ship that became the armed merchant cruiser HMS Salopian
- HMS Shropshire, a County-class cruiser

== Other ==
- Shropshire sheep, a breed of sheep from the county
- Shropshire Blue, a cheese
- Shropshire Slasher, a cartoon figure in the 1956 Looney Tunes cartoon Deduce, You Say!
