= Samuel M. Spencer =

Hawaiʻian politician

Samuel Mahuka Spencer (18 Jul 1875–28 Feb 1960) was a Hawaiʻi island politician.

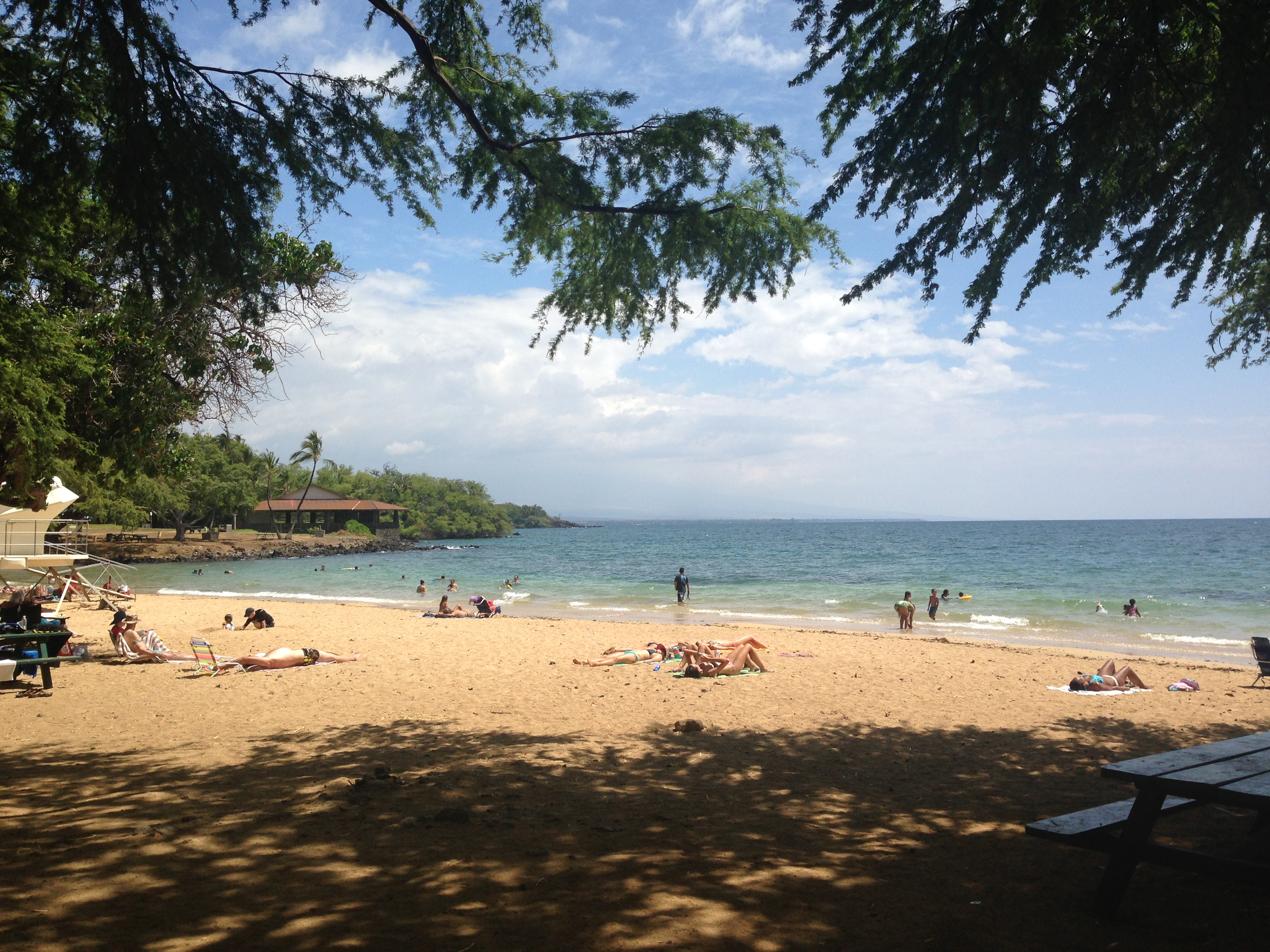
Spencer Beach Park on the South Kohala Coast

Spencer was born in the area in 1875, and died on February 28, 1960. He was named for his maternal uncle Samuel H Mahuka who was a judge in the area from 1893 to 1901. He served as the chairman and executive officer of the Hawaii County Board of Supervisors 1924–1944, and some minor offices in the Territory of Hawaii.

== Park ==
In 2003 the park was renamed to include the original name of the beach, ʻŌhai ʻula. The beach could have been named for the red Sesbania tomentosa trees that originally grew in the area, or the royal poinciana tree Delonix regia.

The Samuel M. Spencer Beach Park in the Kohala area of the Big Island of Hawaii is a favorite camping and snorkeling location. On July 18, 1935 Spencer planted one of the banyan trees lining the "Hilo Walk of Fame" on Banyan Drive. As county chairman Spencer was responsible for some of the access improvements to the Waipiʻo Valley. Some refer to him as a former postmaster in the area, but no record exists. Sources claiming the post office for Waimea, Hawaii County, Hawaii is called "Kamuela", the equivalent of Samuel in the Hawaiian language for Spencer lack a primary source. The beach is a terminus for a segment of the Southern Cross Cable, the major submarine communications cable connecting to the island.
