= Character of the Happy Warrior =

Poem by William Wordsworth

- by William Wordsworth
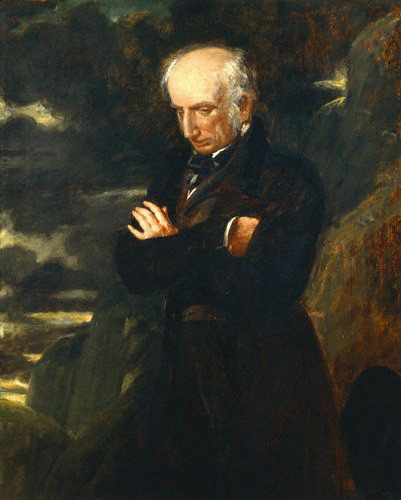
- Portrait of the author by Benjamin Robert Haydon (National Portrait Gallery)
- Written: 1806
- First published in: 1807
- Meter: iambic pentameter

"Character of the Happy Warrior" is a poem by the English Romantic poet William Wordsworth. Composed in 1806, after the death of Lord Nelson, hero of the Napoleonic Wars, and first published in 1807, the poem purports to describe the ideal "man in arms" and has, through the ages since, been the source of much metaphor in political and military life.

== Summary ==
Wordsworth begins by asking us "Who is the happy Warrior? Who is he / What every man in arms should wish to be?". He then proceeds to answer his own query:

The Happy Warrior is a generous spirit, who, amidst, or, in spite of, the tasks of real life, hath done what pleased his innocent, "childish thought". His noble ideas and deeds are "an inward light" (not unlike the Quaker belief in an inner light) that, despite their inwardness, make the path before the warrior "always bright." The Happy Warrior is a diligent student, eager to amass whatever knowledge comes his way; furthermore, and as a result, his principal concern must be his own moral being. All fearsome challenges he transmutes, subduing what negative qualities they may have, and learning from what good they have to offer. The warrior is "skilful in self-knowledge" (like the philosophers of ancient Greece, living by the famous injunction to "know one's self") and understands that the true purpose of "suffering and distress" is to grow in compassion and "tenderness". His law and dearest friend is Reason; he owes all of his triumphs to Virtue. If he achieves high station, he does so honestly; if he cannot act honestly whilst in office, he would sooner quit. Because he is single-mindedly faithful, he does not seek his own advancement. He has a "peculiar grace" that shows itself in any action that he takes, no matter how great or humble. Our Warrior is "happy as a Lover" in the face of the greatest strife; he keeps the law, no matter how severe any conflict may be; when called upon for any task, the Happy Warrior is always equal to it. Though he deals well with all things perilous and turbulent, he aspires to "homefelt pleasures and to gentle scenes" (like Cincinnatus or George Washington). He is not content with any one good or great deed, but always seeks to top himself; and furthermore, for all the worldly esteem he may attain, he, in all his greatness, knows that not even the esteem of history is the most important a man can attain, but that of God: indeed, so long as the Happy Warrior "finds comfort in himself and in his cause", he will have the approval of Heaven, and that, he finally knows, is the only mark of greatness.

The poet concludes with a statement echoing his initial question: "This is the happy Warrior; this is he / Whom every Man in arms should wish to be".

== Meter and rhyme ==
The poem is in iambic pentameter, and is composed mostly in rhyming couplets: thus is the poem written in heroic couplets, fitting for a composition extolling those virtues most apparent in "men in arms," and found often in epic works such as Geoffrey Chaucer's Canterbury Tales. As in much other heroic verse, the poet here seems to object nothing to the occasional poetic triplet.

== Historical basis ==
Wordsworth modelled his Happy Warrior on Lord Nelson, who, though his fleet was victorious, had been killed at the Battle of Trafalgar by a French sniper. Nelson had been famous for his loving, inspirational leadership, and had, in previous battles, lost an arm and the sight in one eye, yet persisted in his pursuit of greatness.

== Other uses in history ==
The term has been used to refer to several American Democratic Party politicians. In nominating Alfred E. Smith for the presidency at the 1924 Democratic National Convention, Franklin D. Roosevelt delivered the Happy Warrior speech in which he notably referred to Smith as "the happy warrior", apparently at the behest of Joseph M. Proskauer, Smith's close friend, campaign advisor and speech writer. Hubert Humphrey was also frequently referred to as "the Happy Warrior". Barack Obama, after winning a second term as president, referred to Vice-President Joe Biden as "America's Happy Warrior" in his acceptance speech. 2024 Democratic vice-presidential nominee Tim Walz has also been referred to "a Happy Warrior," as has New York City Mayor Zohran Mamdani.

The words "happy warrior", an apparent reference to Wordsworth's poem, were famously found written in the personal notes which then-Labour Party leader Ed Miliband accidentally left behind after one of the leaders' debates prior to the 2015 general election.
