= Hilo Hawaiian Hotel =

Hotel in Hilo, Hawaii

Coordinates: 19.7285577°N 155.0667647°W

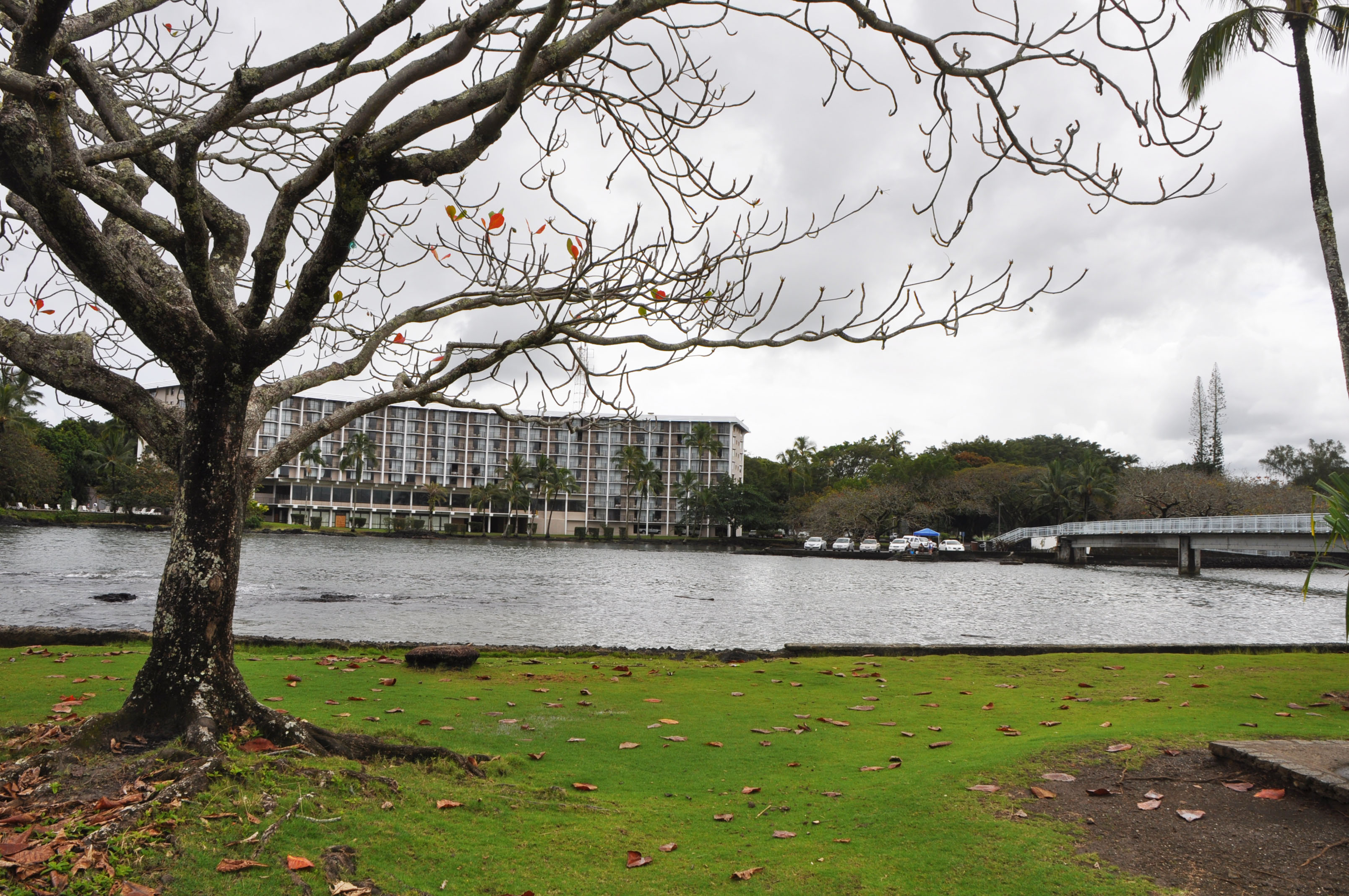
The Hilo Hawaiian Hotel is on Hilo Bay, adjacent to the pedestrian bridge (right) to Coconut Island.

The Hilo Hawaiian Hotel located in Hilo, Hawaii's second largest town, is one of a few relatively large hotels on the east coast of Hawaii Island. It is located, like the Grand Naniloa Hotel, on Banyan Drive.

== Overview ==
The Hilo Hawaiian Hotel was designed by Japanese-Hawaiian architect Ernest Hideo Hara and opened in 1975 on Banyan Drive in Hilo. It has undergone several refurbishments since, with the most recent renovations being a full renovation in 1993, and a $6.5 million upgrade in 2014. The present owner of the hotel is Castle Hotels & Resorts which owns resort hotels in Hawaii and New Zealand.

The hotel has one building, eight-storey high. There is also a fine dining restaurant "Whisky Steak Wine", billed as "Hilo's only steakhouse" and a coffee shop and bar.

From the rooms with ocean view, Hilo Bay spreads out in front, with the majestic view of Mauna Kea in the distance. The pedestrian bridge to Coconut Island in the bay is adjacent to this hotel.

== See also ==
- Grand Naniloa Hotel
- Volcano House
- Points of interest in Hilo
