= Grassy Point, New York =

Coordinates: 41°13′27″N 73°57′50″W

Grassy Point (formerly known as North Haverstraw), is a hamlet on the west side of the Hudson River, in the Town of Stony Point in Rockland County, New York, United States. It is located north of West Haverstraw; east of Harriman State Park; south of Stony Point.

== History ==
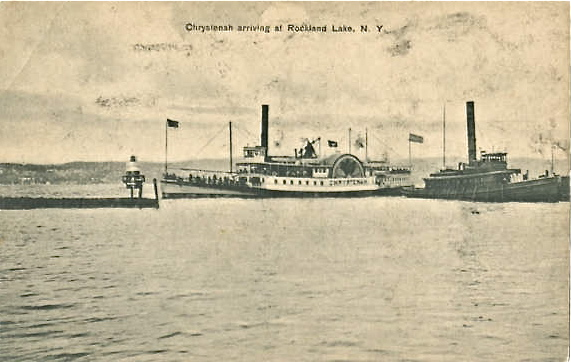
Chrystenah

Grassy Point is a short peninsula extending into the Hudson River in the southeast part of the Town of Stony Point. In 1798 William Denning Sr., a wealthy New York lawyer, purchased the land. He later sold 10 acres (40,000 m^{2}) at the south end of the property to another New York lawyer, William Smith, who built a large two-story house and named it "Rosa Villa", his country estate.

After the death of Denning, his property passed through the hands of Philip Verplanck, Isaac L. Pratt and Dr. Lawrence Proudfoot. In 1830 Proudfoot built the first steamboat landing at Grassy Point. Owing to the depth of water, it was the stopping place for steamers passing up and down the river. The first hotel at Grassy Point was kept by Dr. Proudfoot in a double house near the steamboat wharf. On the north side of that house was a small addition in which Proudfoot kept a small store and bar, and in which the first post office was opened.

The first post office at Grassy Point was opened on July 30, 1834, with James De La Montanya as postmaster. On August 21, 1834, the name of the office was changed to North Haverstraw, and it retained this name until September l0th, 1836, when it was changed back to Grassy Point. On September 5, 1845, the office was discontinued. The post office at Grassy Point was re-established with Alfred M. Wiles as postmaster on April 14, 1871.

In June 1831, the steamboat General Jackson, owned by Jacob Vanderbilt, and plying between New York and Peekskill, blew up at Grassy Point. The boat was later rebuilt and subsequently sold to David P. Mapes who used it on the Kingston-New York run.

In 1845, O. C. Gerow opened a general country store in a building a few feet west of Proudfoot's house. In 1848, James Creney opened a hotel at the Point. The first lumber yard at the Point was started by Walter Fleet, Brewster Gurnee & A. Gurnee and George H. Smith. In the spring of 1845, John I. Wiles moved from Orange County to Grassy Point with his family, and opened a shop for the purpose of doing blacksmith or wheelwright work. In 1871, a foundry was built which manufactured machinery for flour and saw mills and brick making.

The number of vessels engaged in the transportation of brick from the county made marine railways and ship yards near Haverstraw a necessity. In the autumn of 1883, George L. Wicks started a yard at Grassy Point where the depth of water was favorable, and put down a marine railway.

In 1889 St. Joseph’s Roman Catholic Church was established under the direction of Rev. Henry P. Baxter. The church was built by local residents with bricks supplied by the local brickyards. It was part of a much larger community that included a general store, a foundry, two hotels, a firehouse, a school and a bakery.

The brick industry was the area's main business. In the late 1800s and early 1900s brickyards extended along the Hudson River from the village of Haverstraw, (the "Brickmaking Capital of the World") to Grassy Point. In 1905 Patrick Brophy & Sons were producing building bricks at Grassy Point.

== Penny Bridge ==
Around 1875, as the brick industry boomed along the Hudson River in Stony Point and Haverstraw, town officials recognized the need for a bridge to connect Grassy Point to Stony Point and the Rockland mainland. Penny Bridge was constructed at the point where the Minisceongo and Cedar Pond Creeks meet the Hudson River. In order to accommodate the barges and sloops that serviced the factories, a movable span was installed, so well balanced on its central gear that it could be turned by one man with nothing more than a wrench. When water craft needed to pass through, the entire bridge rotated perpendicular to the banks of Cedar Pond Brook over which the bridge extended. The bridge got its name from the penny charged for overland passage. Penny Bridge was demolished in 1951. A plaque commemorates its original location.

Grassy Point was an important freight and passengers shipping point used by the famed Chrystenah and Emeline into the twentieth century.

The Rockland Iron Works was also located here.

== Notable person ==
- Abraham Bogart Conger (July 5, 1814 – May 24, 1887) – member of the New York State Senate
- James "Jim" Aloysius Farley (May 30, 1888 – June 9, 1976) – 53rd United States Postmaster General
