= Laurence L. Doggett =

American educator and YMCA leader (1864–1957)

Laurence Locke Doggett
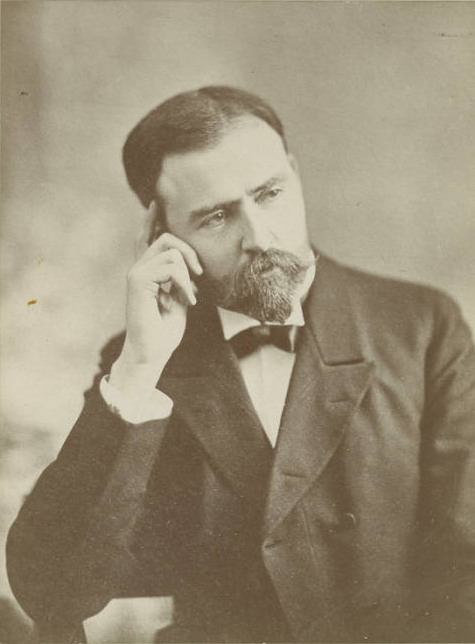
- Photograph from around 1896–1906

4th President of Springfield College
- In office 1896 – 1936
- Preceded by: Charles S. Barrows
- Succeeded by: Ernest M. Best

Personal details
- Born: December 22, 1864 Manchester, Iowa
- Died: November 13, 1957 (aged 92) Longmeadow, Massachusetts
- Spouses: Carolyn C. Durgin (m. 1894; died 1932); Olive Dutcher (m. 1934)
- Children: Ruth Wedgwood Doggett, Clinton Locke Doggett
- Education: Oberlin College (1886); Oberlin Theological Seminary (B.D., 1890); Leipzig University (PhD, 1895)
- Profession: Educator

Laurence Locke Doggett (1864–1957) was an American educator. He was a college president and a leader in the YMCA. Beginning in 1896, he served as the president of the International Young Men's Christian Association Training School in Springfield, Massachusetts, then a fairly small school. Doggett served as its president for 40 years, until 1936. Under his stewardship, it became an accredited degree-granting institution in 1905. It renamed itself to International YMCA College in 1912; today it is known as Springfield College.

== Biography ==
=== Early life and education ===
Laurence L. Doggett and his twin sister Mary Lizzee Doggett were born in Manchester, Iowa on December 22, 1864 to their parents Simeon Locke Doggett and Mary Ann White Doggett. He attended Oberlin College for his undergraduate education, doing his Bachelors in 1882–1886. Afterward, he studied theology at the Oberlin Theological Seminary. He spent 6 months in 1889 at Union Theological Seminary in New York City for a course of study there, before returning to Oberlin to graduate with his Bachelor of Divinity in 1890. He went abroad to Germany for his postgraduate studies. He spent a semester at the University of Berlin, where he briefly studied under the famous scholar Adolf von Harnack. He moved to Leipzig University for the majority of his studies, where he studied under August von Miaskowski. At Leipzig he earned his doctorate in 1895. Doggett's thesis was on the history of the YMCA, later published as "A History of the Young Men's Christian Association."

Upon returning to the United States, Doggett was appointed Secretary of the State of Ohio for the YMCA. After a year, he was offered the presidency of the International Young Men's Christian Association Training School in Springfield, Massachusetts. In the era, this role generally went to ordained ministers who were also scholars, making Doggett a good fit.

=== College president in Springfield ===
Doggett succeeded Charles S. Barrows as president in 1896. At the time of his arrival, the YMCA school was a small vocational training institution with 48 students, 8 faculty members, and a newly established campus adjoining Watershops Pond. Notable staff and department heads in this time period included Luther Gulick, Hanford Burr, Jacob Bowne, and James McCurdy. He added a third year to the curriculum, emphasizing both general education and vocational training. In 1905, Doggett successfully petitioned the Massachusetts Legislature for a charter allowing the school to grant degrees, specifically the Bachelor of Humanics (B.H.) and the Bachelor of Physical Education (B.P.E.). In 1912, the institution was renamed the International YMCA College.

The term "humanics" for the degree of study was popularized by Doggett and Burr, even if they had not created it. In their conception, it was a broad-ranging "study of Man" that encompassed human nature, human affairs, human relations, and practical administrative skills a leader would need.

Under his leadership, the college expanded its admissions policy. Originally limited to preparing men for YMCA careers, the school began training physical education directors for colleges and public schools. Doggett also oversaw a significant increase in international enrollment. Starting in 1902, during the summer, he directed the Silver Bay YMCA Summer Institute, a YMCA training camp near Lake George, New York. Doggett managed the growth of the campus, conducting multiple capital campaigns to fund expansions. These included the creation of Pratt Field in 1910 and the Marsh Library in 1913, the latter of which featured a dedicatory address by former President William Howard Taft.

The college saw enrollment declines during American involvement in World War I (1917–1918), but eventually rebounded from this. The college began granting Bachelor of Science (B.S.) and Master of Education degrees in 1926–1927. Doggett also established a cooperative branch training school in Geneva, Switzerland, which operated from 1927 to 1934 to train physical directors in Europe.

== Personal life, retirement, and death ==
On October 3, 1894, Doggett married Carolyn C. Durgin. They had two children, Ruth Wedgwood and Clinton Locke. Carolyn was highly active in the college community, teaching literature and hosting students. She died in July 1932. On July 3, 1934, Doggett married Olive Dutcher, a professor of biblical history who had taught at Wellesley College and Mount Holyoke College.

Doggett retired from the presidency of Springfield College on August 1, 1936, at the age of 71, completing exactly forty years of service. Upon his retirement, Doggett and his wife Olive went on a world tour, visiting alumni in Europe, Egypt, India and Hawaii. Highlights of these travels included meeting with Mahatma Gandhi and being given the honor of planting a tree along Hilo's Banyan Drive.

In retirement, he resided in Longmeadow, Massachusetts, and spent winters in Sarasota and Bradenton, Florida. In his final years, his health declined due to a stroke. He died at his home in Longmeadow on November 13, 1957, at the age of 92.

== Theology ==
A Congregationalist, Doggett favored liberal Christianity as far as the era's theological disputes. This stance was also reflected in his leadership of the college and the values it represented. This included backing his professors in disputes over their publications. One conflict was after history professor Hanford Burr published "The New Reformation" in 1900 in the school publication Association Outlook, advocating liberal theology, historical-critical biblical analysis, and rejecting biblical inerrancy. Conservative factions within the YMCA demanded Burr's dismissal, which Doggett adamantly refused. The dispute later expanded to target biblical history professor William G. Ballantine, whom Doggett also firmly backed. Doggett's support of his professors helped establish a climate of academic freedom at the college.

== Selected works ==
- Doggett, Laurence Locke (1902). Life of Robert R. McBurney. F. M. Barton.
- Doggett, Laurence Locke; Murray, W. D.; Hansel, J. W. (1905). Studies in Association Work: History, principles, business management. The International Committee of Young Men's Christian Associations.
- Doggett, Laurence Locke (1922). A History of the Young Men's Christian Association. The International Committee of Young Men's Christian Associations.
- Doggett, Laurence Locke (1943). Man and a School: Pioneering in Higher Education at Springfield College. The International Committee of Young Men's Christian Associations.

== Bibliography ==
- Hall, Lawrence K. (1964). Doggett of Springfield: A Biography of Laurence Locke Doggett, Ph.D. Springfield College. LCCN 64-22007.
