= Civitan International =

International service club

- Founded: 1917
- Founder: Courtney Shropshire
- Purpose: Developmental Disabilities
- Location: Birmingham, Alabama
- Region served: Worldwide in 42 countries
- Method: Community service through service clubs, charitable grants
- Members: 40,000
- Revenue: US$ 2,200,000 (2007)
- Website: http://www.civitan.org

Civitan International, based in Birmingham, Alabama, is an association of community service clubs founded in 1917. The organization aims "to build good citizenship by providing a volunteer organization of clubs dedicated to serving individual and community needs with an emphasis on helping people with developmental disabilities." The organization includes 40,000 members (referred to as Civitans) in almost 1,000 clubs around the world.

== History ==
In 1917, a group of Birmingham, Alabama, businessmen were members of the local Rotary club. Many of the men thought that the club focused too much on increasing the business of club members, so they surrendered their club's charter. Led by Courtney Shropshire, a local doctor, they formed an independent service club named Civitan, derived from the Latin word for citizenship.

The United States entered World War I just one month after the club formed. With all attention focused on the war, Civitan remained a local organization. Some of the earliest projects the club undertook supported soldiers, helped European war orphans, and encouraged voter participation through the payment of poll taxes.

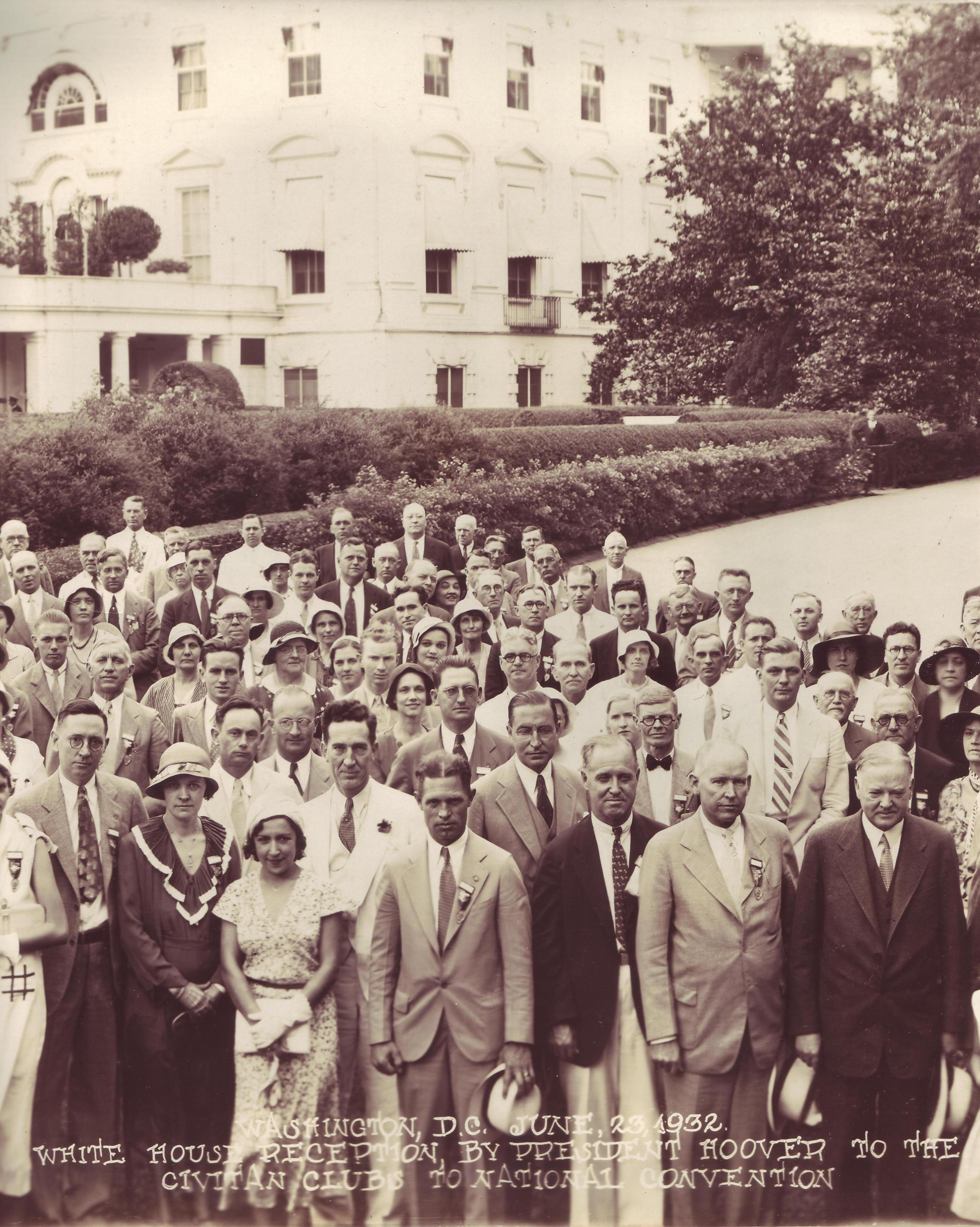
Herbert Hoover (bottom right) holding a reception for delegates to the 12th Civitan International Convention

Shropshire envisioned an international organization of Civitan clubs dedicated to serving humanity. The process to incorporate was begun, and the International Association of Civitan Clubs was founded in 1920. In the years immediately following World War I, the organization saw rapid growth. By June 1922 at the second international convention, delegates from 115 clubs attended; there were more than 3,300 Civitans throughout the United States. Service clubs like Civitan were extremely popular, since they promoted the spirit of optimism which characterized much of the Roaring Twenties.

The vast multiplication of voluntary organizations for altruistic purposes are themselves proof of the ferment of spirituality, service, and mutual responsibility. These associations for advancement of public welfare, improvement, morals, charity, public opinion, health, the clubs and societies for recreation and intellectual advancement, represent something moving at a far greater depth than "joining". They represent the widespread aspiration for mutual advancement, self-expression, and neighborly helpfulness.

— Herbert Hoover, 1922

The club suffered sharp declines in membership and fundraising during the Great Depression. Some also questioned the necessity of service clubs after the New Deal's creation of relief programs. The organization persevered, in part due to cooperation with Rotary, Kiwanis, and Lions clubs. One of the few bright spots in the 1930s was the creation and rapid growth of the first Junior Civitan clubs.

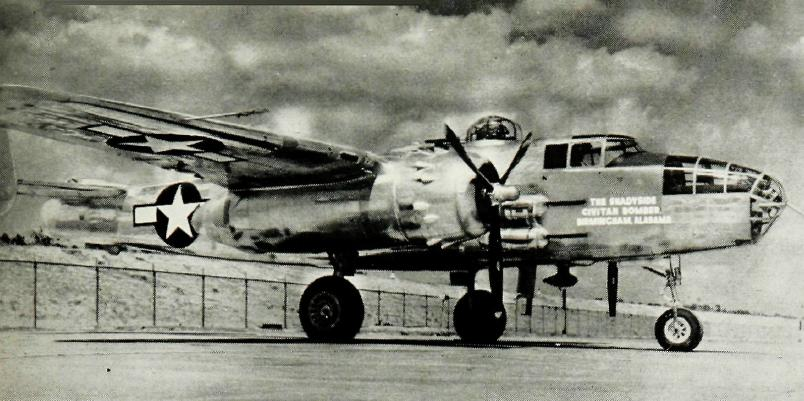
B-25 named after the Shadyside Civitan Club

The organization experienced another noticeable drop in membership at the outbreak of World War II, since many of its civic-minded members were among the first to volunteer for military service. Civitans who remained at home organized scrap metal collections, war bond sales, and blood drives. One club in Birmingham, Alabama, held so many successful bond drives that the Army Air Forces named a North American B-25 Mitchell and a Republic P-47 Thunderbolt in the club's honor.

The period after World War II saw another surge in growth. There were 10,000 members by 1947, with membership tripling in size between 1946 and 1956 as Civitan became the sixth largest service club in the United States. By 1960, there were 34,000 active Civitans in 998 clubs. One reason that Civitan expanded so quickly was the flexibility that it allowed to clubs in other countries. Compromises over issues such as the Civitan creed and membership dues allowed the ethnically diverse organization to maintain a strong sense of unity.

By the 1950s, Civitan's focus had shifted to helping the developmentally disabled. The Civitan International Foundation, established in 1960, provided financial support for many organizations and programs which benefited developmentally disabled individuals. By 2005, the Civitan International Foundation had provided $13,000,000 in grants to the UAB Civitan International Research Center, the first institution in the United States to focus solely on researching developmental disabilities.

== Charitable work ==
=== Service projects ===
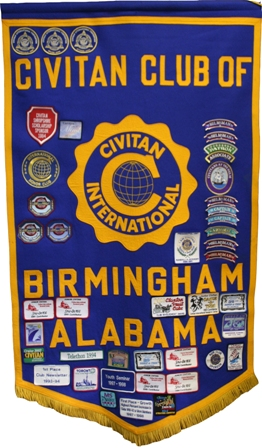
Each club is issued a banner when it is organized. Patches are added to the banner to recognize significant awards, achievements, and milestones.

On a local level, individual Civitan clubs undertake various service projects which benefit their local communities. Examples of club projects include maintaining a section of highway (the Tyler Civitan Club was the first to volunteer for the Adopt a Highway program), promoting the creation of hospitals, honoring community leaders, supporting local reading programs, sponsoring children in financial need, purchasing playground equipment for developmentally disabled children, and holding events for developmentally disabled individuals. Clubs operate independently of the international organization or other clubs, leaving them free to participate in whatever service they deem appropriate.

=== Focus on developmental disabilities ===
While individual clubs are free to pursue their own projects, on an international level Civitan is focused on service to the developmentally disabled. This emphasis was adopted in 1956, with Civitans becoming some of the first to provide special training for teachers of developmentally disabled children.

Civitan continues to focus on assisting those with developmental disabilities. In 1990, the Civitan International Research Center was established on the campus of the University of Alabama at Birmingham with a $20,000,000 grant from the Civitan International Foundation. The Civitan International Research Center was the first institution of its kind in the United States to be focused solely on the research of developmental disabilities. Medical professionals from all over the world also come to the center for training on developmental disabilities.

=== Clergy Appreciation Week ===
One of Civitan's most significant international events is Clergy Appreciation Week, inspired by the story of the Four Chaplains. Begun in 1964, the interfaith event honors the sacrifice of the Four Chaplains by encouraging citizens to thank the clergy who serve their communities. The week usually involves Civitan clubs presenting local clergy with an award or certificate of appreciation. Local mayors often sign a proclamation recognizing Clergy Appreciation Week and encouraging its observance.

=== Junior Civitan International ===
Junior Civitan International is one of Civitan's oldest and most successful programs. Students between the ages of 13 and 18 can join a Junior Civitan club at their school or in their community. Each Junior Civitan club is sponsored by a senior Civitan club and promotes student leadership, character development, and community service.

=== YP Civitan ===
YP Civitan clubs are designed to provide community service and networking opportunities for young professionals aged 21 to 35. YP Civitan of Greensboro, North Carolina was chartered on June 25, 2013, as the first YP Civitan club.

=== World Citizenship Award ===
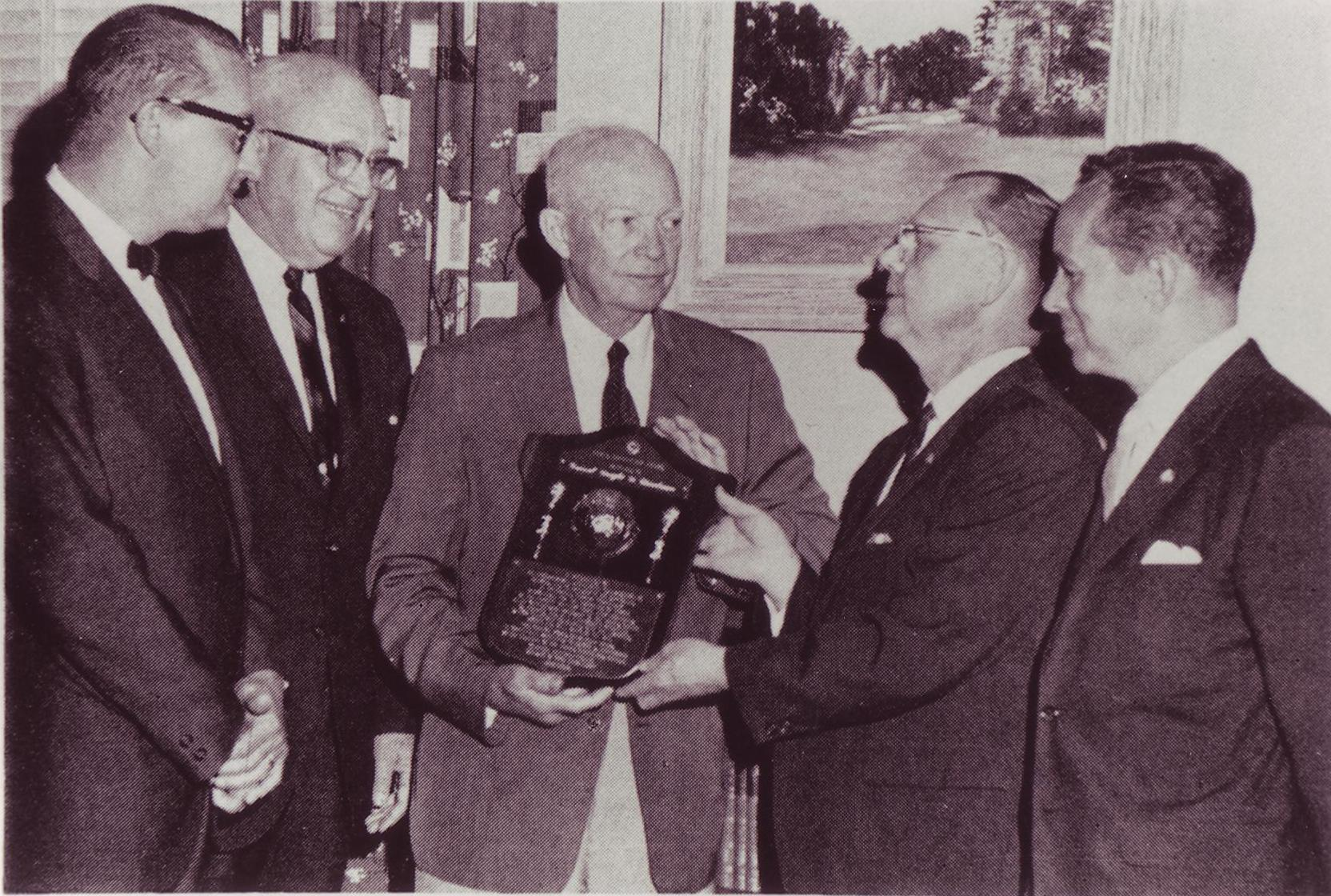
Dwight Eisenhower receives the World Citizenship Award on June 9, 1966.

Civitan has awarded its World Citizenship Award to those "who have made significant contributions to mankind." Recipients of the award include Winston Churchill, Dwight D. Eisenhower, Wernher von Braun, Thor Heyerdahl, and Eunice Kennedy Shriver.

=== Candy Box Project ===
The Civitan Candy Box Project, one of Civitan's oldest and most successful fundraising programs, has raised $50,000,000 since its inception in 1976. Civitan volunteers place boxes of mints at businesses in their community, and patrons donate money to take a piece of candy. Volunteers collect the money, keeping some for club service projects and sending the rest to Civitan International for its charitable projects.

=== Claxton fruitcake sales ===
Civitan's other important fundraiser involves the sale of Claxton Bakery's fruitcakes. This partnership began in 1951 when Tampa Civitan club (#0202) member Earl Carver enjoyed the cake so much that he suggested they be sold nationally as a fundraiser. Each year during the holiday season, local Civitan clubs sell millions of pounds of fruitcake. The proceeds from these sales benefit Civitan International's work with developmentally disabled persons.

== International activities ==
Civitan has clubs in 49 countries and maintains a strong international focus. Because of its long history of service in West Africa, Civitan was invited by the Special Court for Sierra Leone to monitor the war crimes trial of former Liberian President Charles Taylor, held at the International Criminal Court facilities in The Hague. Civitan clubs are active in the following countries:

- Bangladesh
- Cameroon
- Canada
- China
- Ivory Coast
- Denmark
- Egypt
- Estonia
- Germany
- Ghana
- Haiti
- Hungary
- India
- Italy
- Japan
- Jordan
- Kenya
- Liberia
- Mexico
- Moldova
- Nepal
- Netherlands
- Nigeria
- Norway
- Pakistan
- Philippines
- Romania
- Russia
- Senegal
- Sierra Leone
- Slovakia
- South Korea
- Sweden
- Taiwan
- Tanzania
- Thailand
- Togo
- Uganda
- Ukraine
- United Kingdom
- United States of America

== Notable Civitans ==
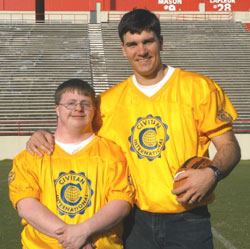
Jake Delhomme appearing in a Civitan public service announcement.

Several well-known individuals have been Civitans, including:

- Thomas Edison
- President Calvin Coolidge
- President Franklin D. Roosevelt, charter member of the New York Civitan Club
- Rep. Joseph W. Byrns Sr., Speaker of the House under Franklin D. Roosevelt from January 3, 1935, to June 4, 1936
- President John F. Kennedy
- President Harry Truman
- Jake Delhomme, former NFL quarterback
- U.S. Supreme Court Justice Hugo Black
- U.S. Supreme Court Justice Ed Sanford
- General John Pershing
- Cornelius Vanderbilt IV, charter member of the New York Civitan Club
- Richard Petty
- Bo Jackson
- Frank Thomas
- Richard Rohmer, who served as a Civitan district governor and international treasurer.
- Richmond H. Hilton, Medal of Honor recipient.

== See also ==
- List of civic, fraternal, service, and professional organizations
