= Happy Warrior speech =

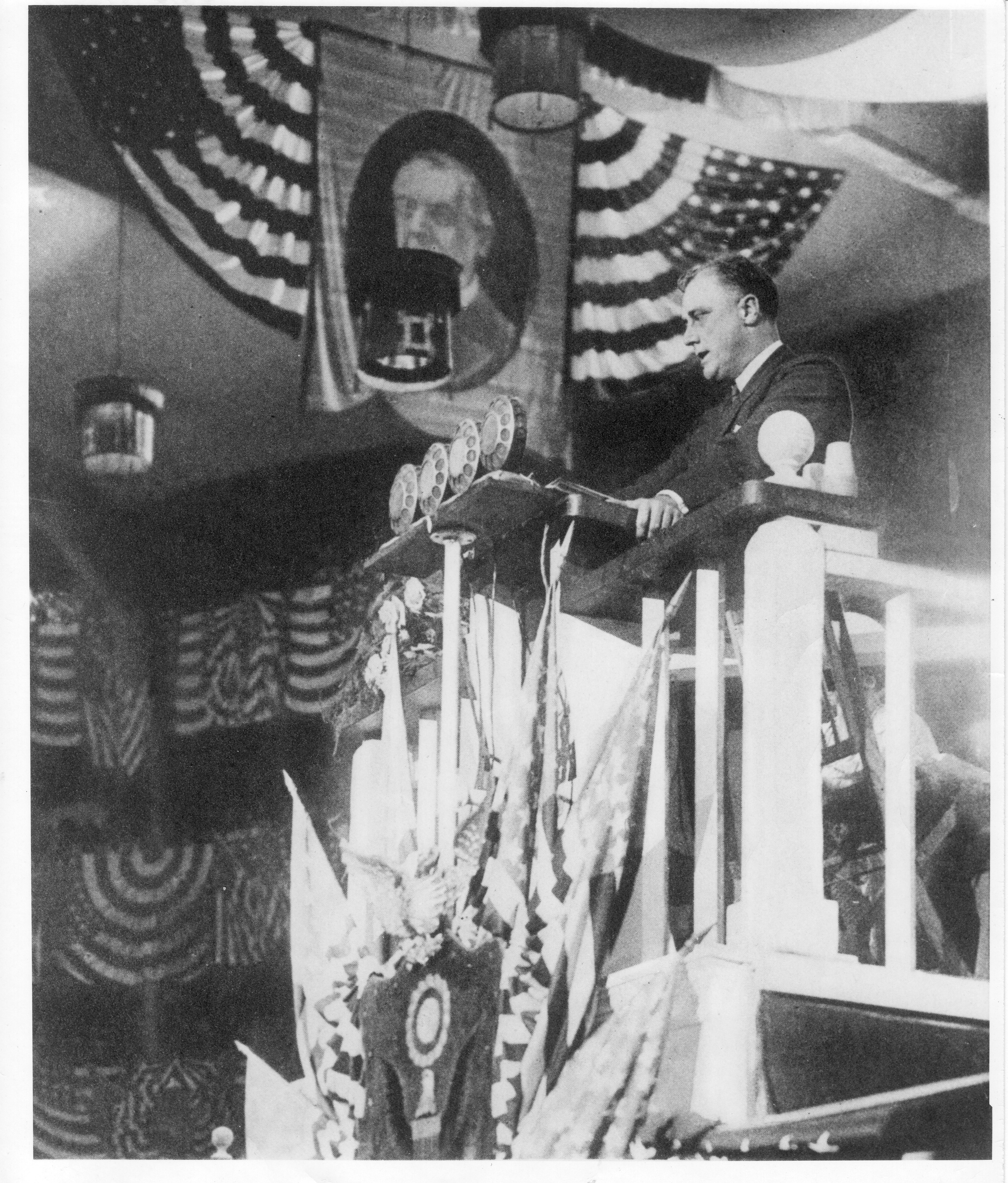
- Roosevelt delivering the speech
- Date: June 26, 1924; 102 years ago
- Venue: Madison Square Garden II
- Location: Manhattan, New York City, New York

The Happy Warrior speech was a major speech delivered by Franklin D. Roosevelt at the 1924 Democratic National Convention, formally placing Al Smith into contention in the balloting for the nomination. In the speech, Roosevelt memorably hailed Smith as "the happy warrior of the political battlefield", alluding to William Wordsworth's poem "Character of the Happy Warrior". The speech marked Roosevelt (who had been the party's 1920 vice presidential nominee) first major public appearance after a serious bout with polio in 1921. As the 1924 presidential conventions were the first to be carried on broadcast radio, Roosevelt's speech was heard by a radio audience.

== Background ==
As he had at the 1920 Democratic National Convention, Franklin D. Roosevelt acted as Al Smith's floor manager at the 1924 Democratic National Convention and delivered the speech as a nominating address in support Smith's candidacy on July 26, 1924 (the third day of the 1924 convention), ahead of balloting for the presidential nomination.

Roosevelt had been the Democratic Party's 1920 vice presidential nominee. After the Democratic ticket lost the 1920 election, Roosevelt suffered a serious bout with polio in 1921. Roosevelt had not made a major public appearance since then, and his appearance at the 1924 convention was greeted as a triumphant return to the political stage.

While Roosevelt lacked the mobility to walk after 1921, he concealed this by placing his legs in braces. He held onto his son James with his left arm, and leaned on a crutch with his right arm; using his upper body to pull his lower limbs across the convention stage, he created the appearance that he was walking from his seat in the New York delegation to the speaking platform. During his speech, he remained standing by holding tightly onto the podium.

== Speech ==
The speech has been dubbed the "Happy Warrior" due to a line in which Roosevelt, alluding to William Wordsworth's poem "Character of the Happy Warrior", referred to Smith as, "the happy warrior of the political battlefield". The speech lasted 34 minutes, and was met with a resounding applause.

Roosevelt had not written the speech. Being preoccupied with securing delegate support, he asked Joseph Proskauer to write it. Proskauer obliged and provided him with a speech he had already written for Roosevelt. Roosevelt balked, particularly objecting to the line referencing the work of Wadsworth, which Roosevelt believed was too poetic for a political audience. Proskauer refused to remove it. Roosevelt countered by writing a speech on his own. Proskauer and Roosevelt sought the opinion of Herbert Bayard Swope. Swope first read Roosevelt's and stated it was the worst speech he had ever read. He then read Proskauer's and acclaimed it as the greatest since Edward S. Bragg's seconding of Grover Cleveland at the 1884 Democratic National Convention. (Note: Bragg's speech included the line "They love him most for the enemies he has made!" referencing the Tammany Hall Democratic organization's opposition to Cleveland.) Roosevelt continued to object, and only begrudgingly relented after Smith told him to either deliver the "Happy Warrior" speech or deliver nothing.

== Reception ==
The speech was very well-received. Historian Mark Sullivan later called it, "a noble utterance".

With the 1924 conventions being the first to be carried on broadcast radio, Roosevelt's speech had a wider audience than it would have at previous conventions. Roosevelt had a radio-friendly voice, and received praise from people that had heard his speech over the airwaves.

== Aftermath ==
Smith failed to garner the nomination, which required two-thirds support. The vote deadlocked until delegates settled on a compromise candidate after a record 103 rounds of balloting.

The success of Roosevelt's speech and his other convention efforts in support of Smith signaled that he was still a viable figure in politics, and he nominated Smith again at the 1928 Democratic National Convention, where Smith won the nomination but went on to lose the general election. Roosevelt won election in 1928 to succeed Smith as governor of New York. Roosevelt defeated Smith and others for the presidential nomination at the 1932 Democratic National Convention, and went on to win the general election.

== Subsequent political allusions ==
The label "happy warrior" has been alluded to and co-opted by those supporting subsequent presidential hopefuls, including Bill Clinton, George W. Bush, and John Edwards.
