= Packard Business College =

Business school in Manhattan, New York City

Coordinates: 40.740598°N 73.989416°W

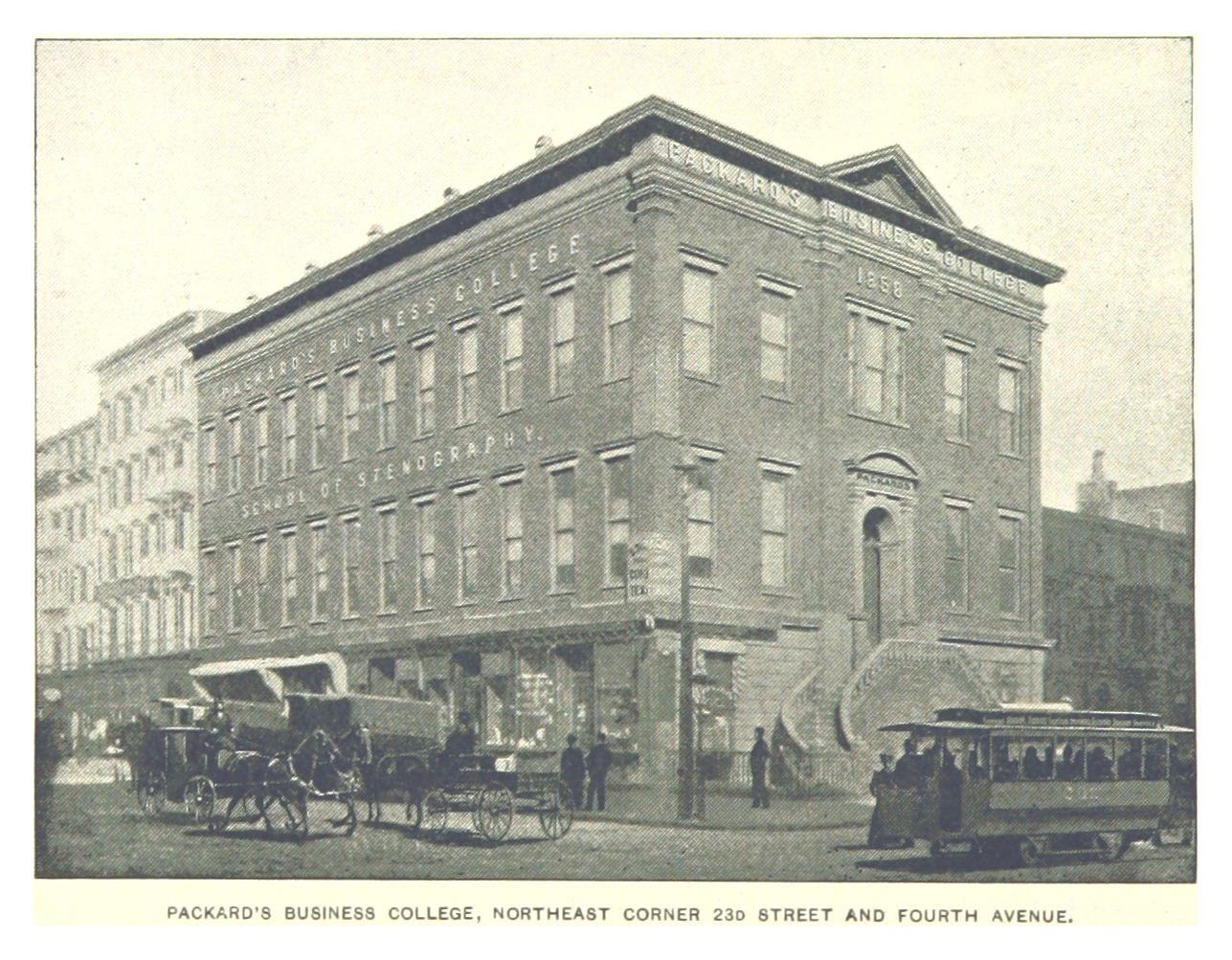
- Former names: Bryant, Stratton & Packard's Mercantile College
- Type: Business college
- Active: 1858–1954
- Founder: Mr. S. S. Packard
- Campus: Urban

Packard's Business College or Packard Business College was a post-secondary business college in New York City which provided a concentrated one-year education in practical business subjects, such as arithmetic, bookkeeping, penmanship, and business correspondence. The school was well respected for the quality of its graduates.

The school was founded in 1858, under the name of Bryant, Stratton & Packard's Mercantile College, by Mr. S. S. Packard and was the New York branch of a chain known as the Bryant & Stratton chain of business colleges. In 1867, Mr. Packard purchased the Bryant & Stratton interest in the New York College and changed its name to Packard's Business College.

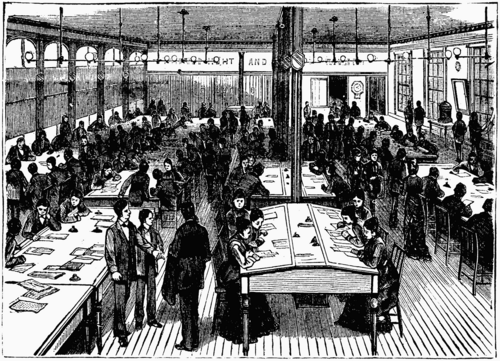
Students studying at Packard's Business College.

The teachers employed in the college were chosen for their practical and theoretical knowledge of business affairs. A Packard Business College, situated at 22nd and Broadway, New York, was featured in the 1947 film The Shocking Miss Pilgrim, whose initial graduates are described as "the first group of typewriters to graduate from any business college anywhere in the world".

The school closed by 1954 and the building was purchased by Stern College for Women.

== Notable people ==
- Sophia Braeunlich (1854–1898), business manager, journalist
