= Service club =

Type of voluntary nonprofit organization

A service club or service organization is a voluntary nonprofit organization where members meet regularly to perform charitable works either by direct hands-on efforts or by raising money for other organizations. A service club is defined firstly by its service mission and secondly by its membership benefits, such as social occasions, networking, and personal growth opportunities that encourage involvement.

Service organizations are not necessarily exclusive of ideological motives, although organizations with such defined motives are more likely to identify themselves through their association. Much like the historical religious organizations that formed the basis for many societal institutions, such as hospitals, service organizations perform many essential services for their community and other worthy causes. In the United States, some of these clubs usually also have a component club organization that is a tax exempt 501(c)(3) nonprofit organization.

Many of today's service clubs started as social clubs for business networking, but quickly evolved into organizations devoted more to service than to networking, although networking may still be the primary reason many members decided to join.

Historically, most service clubs consist of community-based groups with the same name, goals, membership requirements, and meeting structure. Many of these clubs meet weekly, bi-weekly, or monthly on a recurring established day and time, commonly at mealtime. Most of these clubs started with a single club in a single city but then replicated themselves by organizing similar clubs in other communities. Many of the service club organizations have become worldwide movements, and have obtained official recognition by the United Nations and various governments as non-governmental organizations (NGO).

== Examples ==
- Civitan International
- Junior Chamber International
- Kiwanis
  - Key Club
- Lions Clubs International
  - Leo clubs
- Optimist International
- Rotary International
  - Rotaract
- Round Table
- Ruritan
- Soroptimist International
- Zonta International

== See also ==
- Charitable organization
- Voluntary association
