= Courtney Shropshire =

American philanthropist

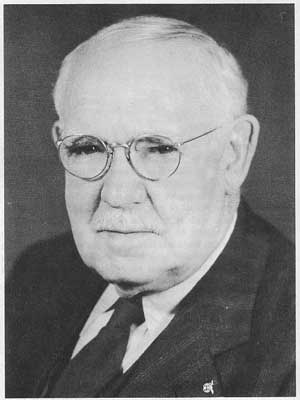
- c. 1962
- Born: Courtney William Shropshire; July 10, 1877; New Orleans, Louisiana, US
- Died: April 28, 1965 (aged 87); Thousand Oaks, California, US
- Occupations: Doctor, non-profit worker

Courtney William Shropshire (July 10, 1877 – April 28, 1965), a medical doctor in Birmingham, Alabama, was the founder and first president of Civitan International.

== Early life ==
Courney William Shropshire was born in New Orleans, Louisiana on July 10, 1877. While living in Jackson, Mississippi, he briefly attended Mississippi A&M, Millsaps College, and Ward's Business College. After moving to Franklin, Tennessee, to avoid an outbreak of yellow fever, he took a job as an assistant for a local doctor. This experience led him to enroll in the medical school of the University of Tennessee in Nashville.

After graduating in 1900, Shropshire began to practice in several small towns. He moved to Birmingham, Alabama in 1903. He completed post-graduate studies at the Johns Hopkins University School of Medicine and the Mayo Clinic. Shropshire also served as the United States Public Health Service representative for Birmingham and the president of the Jefferson County Medical Society.

== Founding of Civitan International ==
Shropshire was attending a newly organized Rotary club in 1917. He and several of the other Rotarians decided that the club was too focused on increasing the business of its members. They surrendered their Rotary charter and formed an independent service club focused on serving the community and meeting the needs of individuals that could be served person to person, rather than business for business. By serving and creating a healthy-whole community, the businesses would naturally thrive. They held their first meeting on March 17, 1917, with 37 charter members.

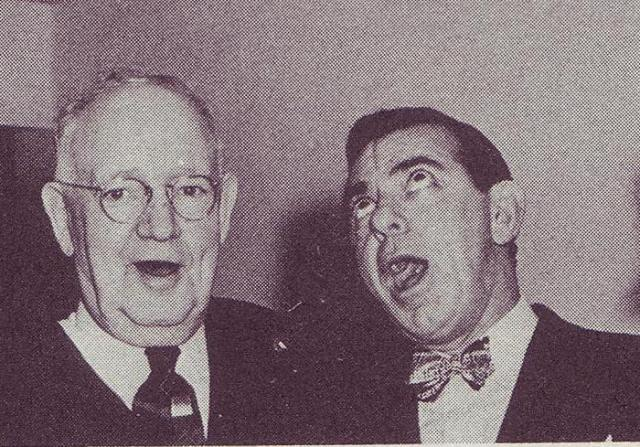
Shropshire and Eddie Cantor promoting blood donation in 1952

They named the group the "Civitan Club". Shropshire was elected president for two successive terms as the club grew to 200 members. He envisioned an international organization of clubs, but the nation's focus on World War I prevented the club from becoming anything more than a local club.

With businessmen in other cities asking to form clubs, the International Association of Civitan Clubs was established in 1920; it would later become Civitan International. Shropshire was elected as the first international president for two years in a row; he remains the only individual to serve two terms as international president.

After his terms ended, Shropshire continued to actively promote Civitan. He was a frequent speaker at Civitan's international conventions, and he visited clubs across the country until his death. He died in Thousand Oaks, California on April 28, 1965, and was buried at Elmwood Cemetery in Birmingham.

== Awards and honors ==
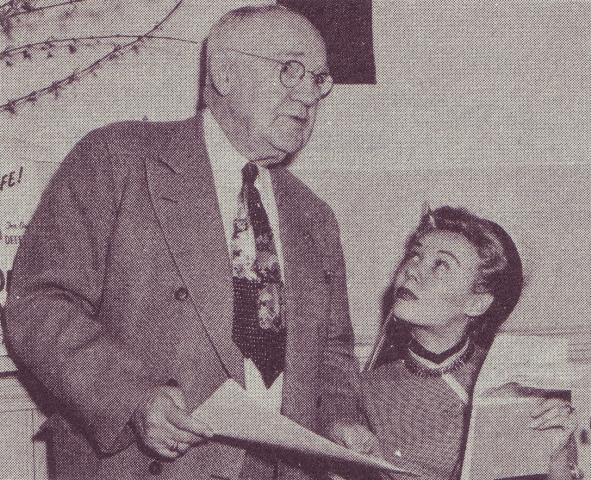
Courtney Shropshire with American film actress-dancer Vera-Ellen recruiting blood donors for the Baltimore Defense Blood Center in 1952

- Key to the city of Birmingham, Alabama (1957)
- Honorary citizen of New Orleans, Louisiana, and key to the city (1958)
- Key to the city of San Diego, California (1958)
- Key to the city of Memphis, Tennessee (1960)
- Honorary citizen of Dallas, Texas (1960)
