= Dewey =

Dewey may refer to:

== Places ==
=== In the United States ===
- Dewey, Arizona, a former unincorporated town, now part of the town of Dewey-Humboldt
- Wasco, California, formerly Dewey, a city
- Dewey, Idaho, a ghost town
- Dewey, Illinois, an unincorporated community
- Dewey, Indiana, an unincorporated community
- Dewey, Missouri, a ghost town
- Dewey, Montana, a census-designated place
- Dewey, Oklahoma, a city
- Dewey, South Dakota, an unincorporated community
- Dewey, Utah, a ghost town
- Dewey, Skagit County, Washington, an unincorporated community
- Dewey, Wisconsin (disambiguation), various places
- Dewey County, Oklahoma
- Dewey County, South Dakota
- Dewey Lake, Kentucky
- Dewey Lake (St. Louis County, Minnesota)
- Dewey Marsh, Wisconsin
- Dewey Mountain, in Saranac Lake, New York
- Dewey Beach, Delaware

=== Canada ===
- Dewey, a former railway station near McGregor, British Columbia

== People and fictional characters ==
- Dewey (given name)
- Dewey (surname)

== Other uses ==
- USS Dewey, various ships
- Dewey (deer), the first cloned deer
- Dewey Readmore Books, a library cat in Spencer, Iowa, and subject of the 2008 non-fiction book
- Dewey: The Small-Town Library Cat Who Touched the World, a 2008 non-fiction book
- Dewey (hill), a classification of hills and mountains

== See also ==
- Dewey Decimal Classification, proprietary system of library classification
- Dewey Commission
- Center for Dewey Studies
- Dewey Square, Boston, Massachusetts
- Dewey & LeBoeuf, a law firm
