= Dewey (surname) =

Dewey surname is of Welsh origin; the surname is an Anglified spelling of "Dewi".

It may refer to:

== People ==
- Alvin Dewey (1912–1987), American special agent
- A. Peter Dewey (1916–1945), American colonel
- Charles Almon Dewey (1877–1958), American judge
- Charles Melville Dewey (1849–1937), American painter
- Charles S. Dewey (1880–1980), American politician
- Chester Dewey (1784–1867), American scientist
- C. Ernest Dewey (1861-1945), American politician
- Davis Rich Dewey (1858–1942), American economist
- Edward H. Dewey (1837–1904), American doctor
- Edward R. Dewey (1895–1978), American economist
- George Dewey (1837–1917), American admiral
- James Dewey, MP for Dorset 1656, and Wareham 1659
- John Dewey (1859–1952), American philosopher, psychologist, and educational reformer
- John Frederick Dewey (born 1937), British geologist
- John J. Dewey (died 1891), American territorial legislator and physician
- Lyster Dewey (1865–1944), American botanist
- Martin Dewey (1881–1933), American orthodontist
- Matthew Dewey (born 1984), Australian composer
- Melvil Dewey (1851–1931), American librarian and creator of the Dewey Decimal System
- Nelson Dewey (1813–1889), American politician
- Orville Dewey (1794–1882), American clergyman
- Rob Dewey (born 1983), Scottish rugby player
- Thomas B. Dewey (1915–1981), American author
- Thomas E. Dewey (1902–1971), American 47th Governor of New York
- Thomas E. Dewey Jr. (1932–2021), American executive
- Tommy Dewey, American actor, producer, and writer

== Fictional characters ==
- Bill Dewey, ex-mayor of Beach City in Steven Universe
- Ms. Dewey, in a viral marketing campaign for Microsoft Live Search
- Dewey, Cheatem & Howe, a partner in the fictional law firm

== See also ==
- Justice Dewey (disambiguation)
- Heather Dewey-Hagborg (born 1982), American artist and educator
- Duhé, surname
