= Thomas Dewey (disambiguation) =

Thomas E. Dewey (1902–1971) was an American politician who served as Governor of New York from 1943 to 1954 and ran twice to become President of the United States.

Thomas Dewey may also refer to:

- Thomas Charles Dewey (1840–1926), President of the Prudential Assurance Company
- Thomas B. Dewey (1915–1981), American crime novelist
- Thomas E. Dewey Jr. (1932–2021), son of the governor, investment banker
- Thomas R. Dewey (born 1978), American actor, producer, and writer

== See also ==
- Dewey (disambiguation)
