= Dewey, Washington =

Dewey is the name of two unincorporated communities in the U.S. state of Washington:

- Dewey, Skagit County, Washington
- Dewey, Whatcom County, Washington
