= Dewey, Wisconsin =

Dewey is the name of some places in the U.S. state of Wisconsin:

- Dewey, Burnett County, Wisconsin, a town
- Dewey, Portage County, Wisconsin, a town
- Dewey, Rusk County, Wisconsin, a town
- Dewey (community), Wisconsin, an unincorporated community

== See also ==
- Dewey Corners, Wisconsin, an unincorporated community
- Dewey Marsh, Wisconsin, a state wildlife refuge
