= Frances Eileen Dewey =

American singer

Frances Dewey

First Lady of New York
- In office January 1, 1943 – December 31, 1954
- Governor: Thomas E. Dewey
- Preceded by: Jean Poletti
- Succeeded by: Marie Norton Harriman

Personal details
- Born: Frances Eileen Hutt; February 27, 1903 Sherman, Texas, U.S.
- Died: July 19, 1970 (aged 67) New York City, New York, U.S.
- Spouse(s): Thomas E. Dewey (m. 1928)
- Children: Thomas E. Dewey Jr. John Martin Dewey
- Education: Chicago Musical College; Percy Rector Stephens's music school
- Occupation: Singer

Frances Eileen Dewey (née Hutt; February 7, 1903 – July 19, 1970) was an American singer and First Lady of New York from 1943 to 1954. She was the wife of Thomas E. Dewey and performed professionally under the stage name Eileen Hoyt before ending her singing career after her marriage in 1928. From 1923 to 1927, she toured with Broadway productions, including a road company of George White's Scandals.

== Early life and education ==
Dewey was born in Sherman, Texas, to Orla Thomas Hutt and Lee Davis Hutt. The family moved to Sapulpa, Oklahoma, when Dewey was seven years old. She had an older brother, Harold, and a younger sister, Maryanna. She was a grandniece of Jefferson Davis.

Dewey performed in school plays, church groups and other local events while growing up in Sapulpa. She graduated from Sapulpa High School in 1921 as valedictorian.

After graduating from high school, Dewey pursued a career in music. She had insufficient funds to go New York to pursue a singing career, so the Kiwanis Club sponsored a benefit concert that raised $400. With the money and a family railroad pass, she traveled to New York to pursue a career in music.

Dewey initially planned to accept a music scholarship at the University of Oklahoma, but her voice teacher persuaded her to study with Percy Rector Stephens in New York. She supported herself by working as Stephens's secretary and singing soprano at church services.

== Music career ==
In 1923, Dewey was the administrator of Stephens's school and accompanied him to Chicago for his summer courses for music teachers. There she met Thomas E. Dewey, who was studying under Stephens on a music scholarship. They married on January 16, 1928, after E. Dewey received his law degree from Columbia University and established a law practice in New York.

Dewey performed professionally under the stage name Eileen Hoyt. From 1923 to 1927, she toured with Broadway productions. She was a soloist in a variety show at the Paramount Theatre shortly after its opening in 1926 and made two 20-week tours of the Paramount theater circuit. She also toured with a John Murray Anderson's Almanac show and was understudy for the principal soloist in a road company of George White's Scandals.

After marrying Dewey, Dewey ended her singing career and withdrew from the spotlight. She said that music had been her entire life until marriage, when she made a conscious decision to leave her professional career.

== Public life ==
After her husband was elected governor of New York in 1942, Dewey became First Lady of New York. She divided her time between Albany and the family's farm in Pawling, New York, which they had acquired in 1939.

For much of her husband's political career, Dewey sought to remain out of the public spotlight. After her husband received the Republican nomination for president in 1944, Dewey became active in his campaign. She held her first press conference in Chicago in June 1944.

== Personal life and death ==
Dewey had two sons with her husband, Thomas E. Dewey: Thomas E. Dewey Jr., born in 1932, and John Martin Dewey, born in 1935.

Dewey died on July 19, 1970, at Memorial Hospital for Cancer and Allied Diseases in New York City after a long illness. Her funeral service was held at St. James' Episcopal Church on Madison Avenue in Manhattan, with burial in Pawling. Following her death, Governor Nelson Rockefeller ordered the flags at the New York State Capitol and Executive Mansion lowered to half-staff in her memory.
