= 1952 Republican Party vice presidential candidate selection =

1952 Republican vice presidential nomination
- July 11, 1952
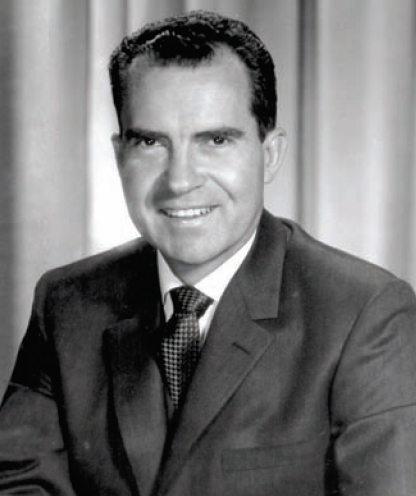
Nominee	Richard Nixon
Home state	California
Previous Vice Presidential nominee
Earl Warren
Vice Presidential nominee
Richard Nixon

Senator Richard M. Nixon's speech at a state Republican Party fundraiser in New York City on May 8, 1952, impressed Governor Thomas E. Dewey, who was an Eisenhower supporter and had organized a pro-Eisenhower delegation from New York to attend the national convention. In a private meeting following the speech, Dewey suggested to Nixon that he would make a suitable vice presidential candidate to run alongside Eisenhower.

Nixon attended the convention as a delegate pledged to Earl Warren and represented California on the convention's platform committee. In pre-convention remarks to reporters, Nixon touted Warren as the most prominent dark horse and suggested that if Warren was not the presidential nominee, Nixon's Senate colleague William Knowland would be a good choice for vice president. As the convention proceedings continued, Warren became concerned that Nixon was working for Eisenhower while ostensibly pledged to Warren. Warren asked Paul H. Davis of the Hoover Institution at Stanford University, who had been a vice president at Columbia University while Eisenhower was the school's president, to tell Eisenhower that Warren resented such actions and wanted them to stop. Eisenhower informed Davis that he did not oppose Warren, because if Taft and Eisenhower deadlocked, then Warren would be his first choice for the nomination. In the same conversation, Eisenhower indicated that if he won the nomination, Nixon would be his first choice for the vice presidency, because Eisenhower believed the party needed to promote leaders who were aggressive, capable, and young. Eisenhower later developed a list of seven potential candidates, with Nixon's name at the top.

After Eisenhower was nominated, his key supporters met to discuss vice presidential possibilities. Eisenhower informed the group's chairman, Herbert Brownell Jr. that he did not wish to appear to dictate to the convention by formally sponsoring a single candidate, so the group reviewed several, including Taft, Everett Dirksen, and Alfred E. Driscoll, all of whom they quickly rejected. Dewey then raised Nixon's name; the group quickly concurred. Brownell checked with Eisenhower, who indicated his approval. Brownell then called Nixon to inform him that he was Eisenhower's choice. Nixon accepted, then departed for Eisenhower's hotel room to discuss the details of the campaign and Eisenhower's plans for his vice president if the ticket was successful in the general election.

The delegates soon assembled to formalize the selection. Nixon asked Knowland to nominate him, and Knowland agreed. After Taft supporter John W. Bricker declined Nixon's request to second the nomination, Driscoll agreed to do so. There were no other candidates, and Nixon was nominated by acclamation.

Months after the convention, Eisenhower considered asking Nixon to step down as running mate due to controversy surrounding campaign expenses, but Nixon rallied public opinion with his Checkers speech and remained on the ticket. The Eisenhower–Nixon ticket won the 1952 election, defeating the Stevenson–Sparkman ticket, as well as the 1956 election, in which they defeated the ticket of Stevenson and Kefauver. Nixon was the Republican presidential nominee in 1960 but lost to John F. Kennedy in the close general election. He lost the election for California governor in 1962, but was elected president in 1968 and 1972.

== Potential running mates ==
=== Finalists ===
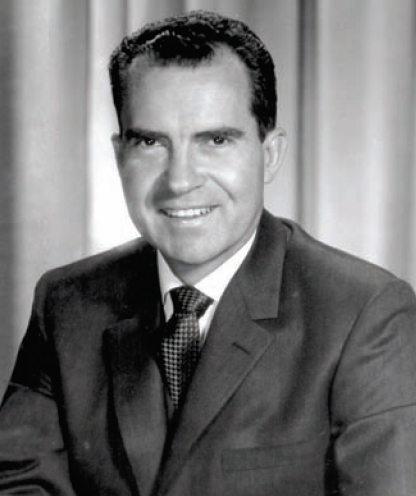
Senator
Richard Nixon
from California
(1950–1953)

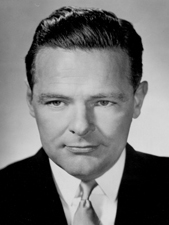
Senator & Co-Campaign Manager
Henry Cabot Lodge Jr.
from Massachusetts
(1947–1953)

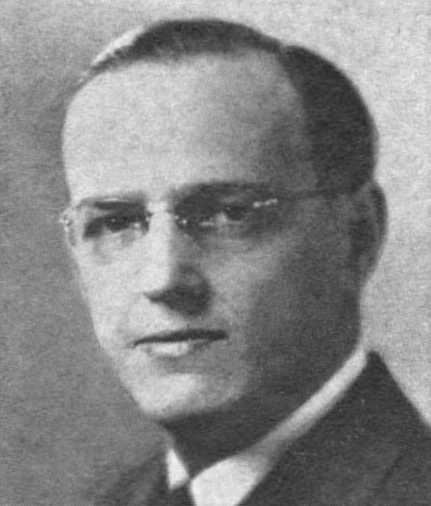
Representative
Walter Judd
from Minnesota
(1943–1963)

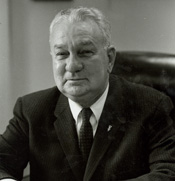
House Majority Leader
Charles A. Halleck
from Indiana
(1947–1949)

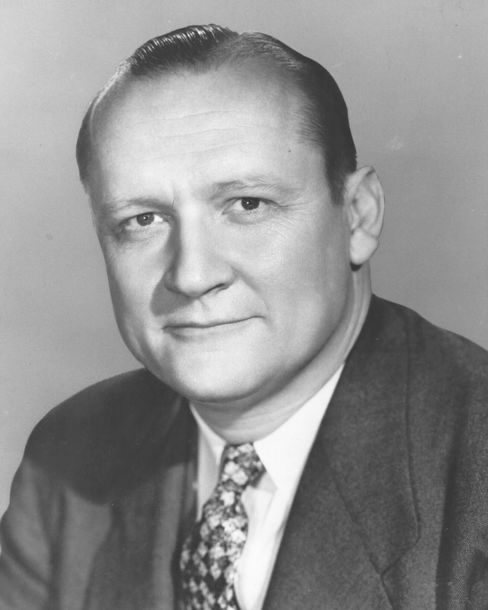
Senator
William Knowland
from California
(1945–1959)

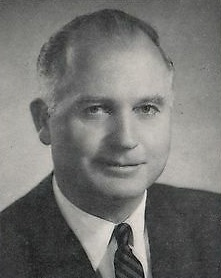
Governor
Daniel Thornton
of Colorado
(1951–1955)

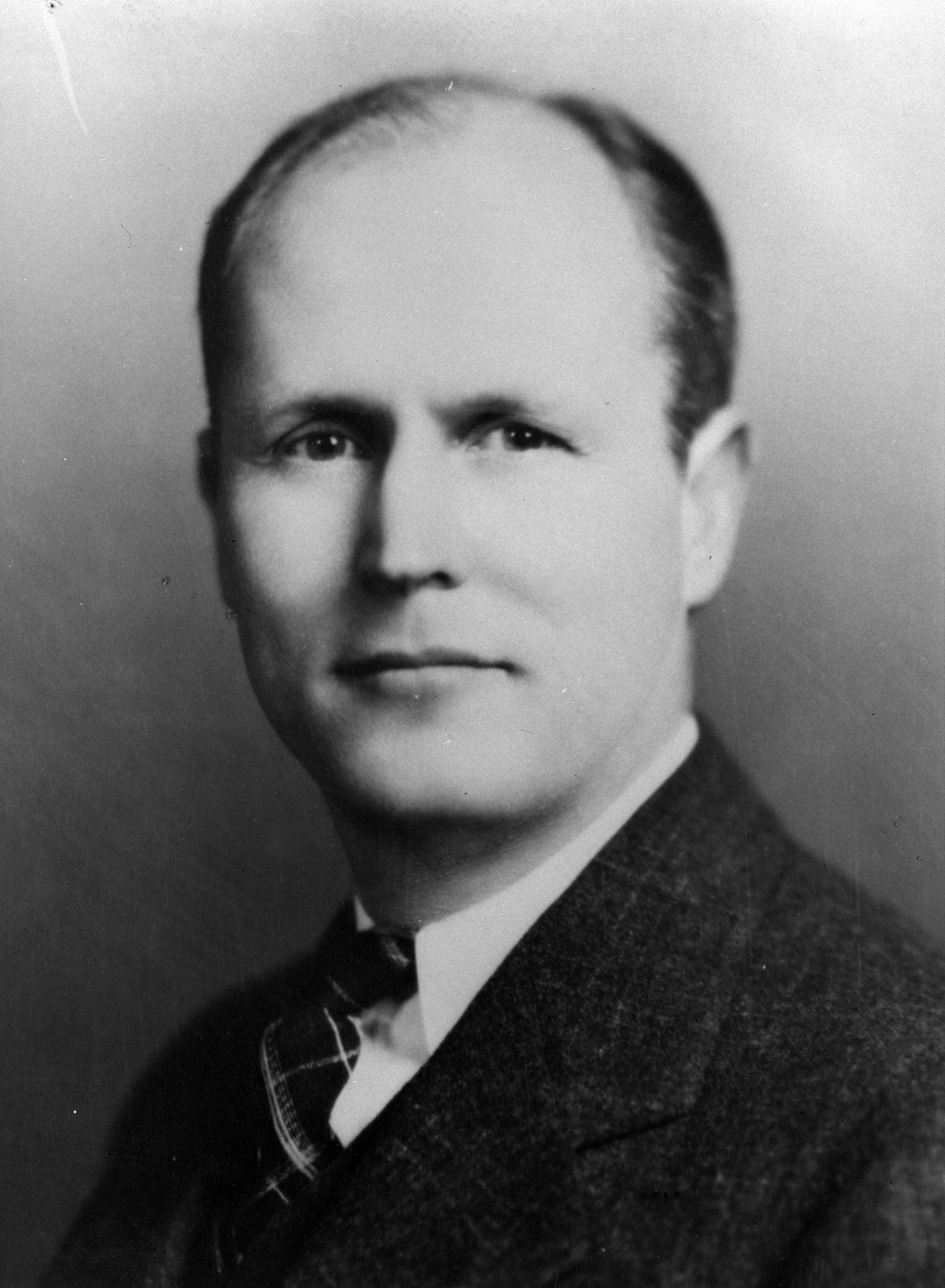
Governor
Arthur B. Langlie
of Washington
(1949–1957)

=== Others ===
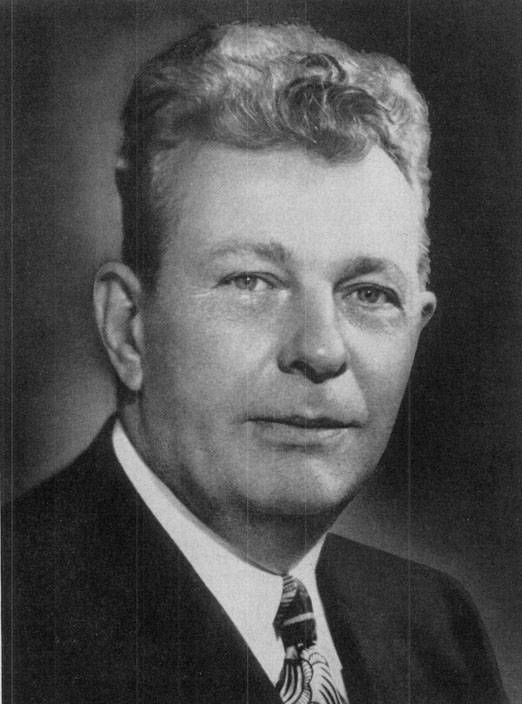
Senator
Everett Dirksen
from Illinois
(1951–1969)

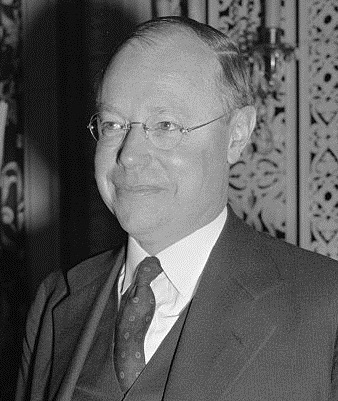
Senator
Robert A. Taft
from Ohio
(1939–1953)

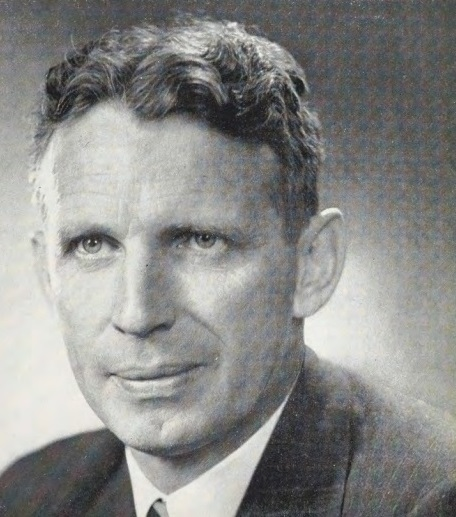
Governor
Alfred E. Driscoll
of New Jersey
(1947–1954)

== See also ==
- 1952 Republican National Convention
