= Justice Dewey =

Justice Dewey may refer to:

- Charles Dewey (Indiana judge) (1784–1862), associate justice of the Indiana Supreme Court
- Charles Augustus Dewey (1793–1866), associate justice of the Massachusetts Supreme Judicial Court
- Daniel Dewey (1766–1815), associate justice of the Massachusetts Supreme Judicial Court
