= Duhé =

Duhé or Duhe is a surname. Notable people with the surname include:

- A. J. Duhe (born 1955), American football player
- John M. Duhé Jr. (born 1933), American judge
- Elley Duhé (born 1992), American singer and songwriter
- Lawrence Duhé (1887–1960), American jazz musician
