= Dewey Lake (St. Louis County, Minnesota) =

Lake in St. Louis County, in the U.S. state of Minnesota

- Location within Minnesota
- Location: St. Louis County, Minnesota
- Coordinates: 47°35′30″N 92°56′36″W
- Type: Lake
- Surface elevation: 1,401 feet (427 m)

Dewey Lake is a lake in St. Louis County, in the U.S. state of Minnesota.

According to Warren Upham, Dewey Lake may be named for George Dewey (1837–1917), an American admiral.

== See also ==
- List of lakes in Minnesota
