= Dewey, Portage County, Wisconsin =

Dewey, Wisconsin
- Town
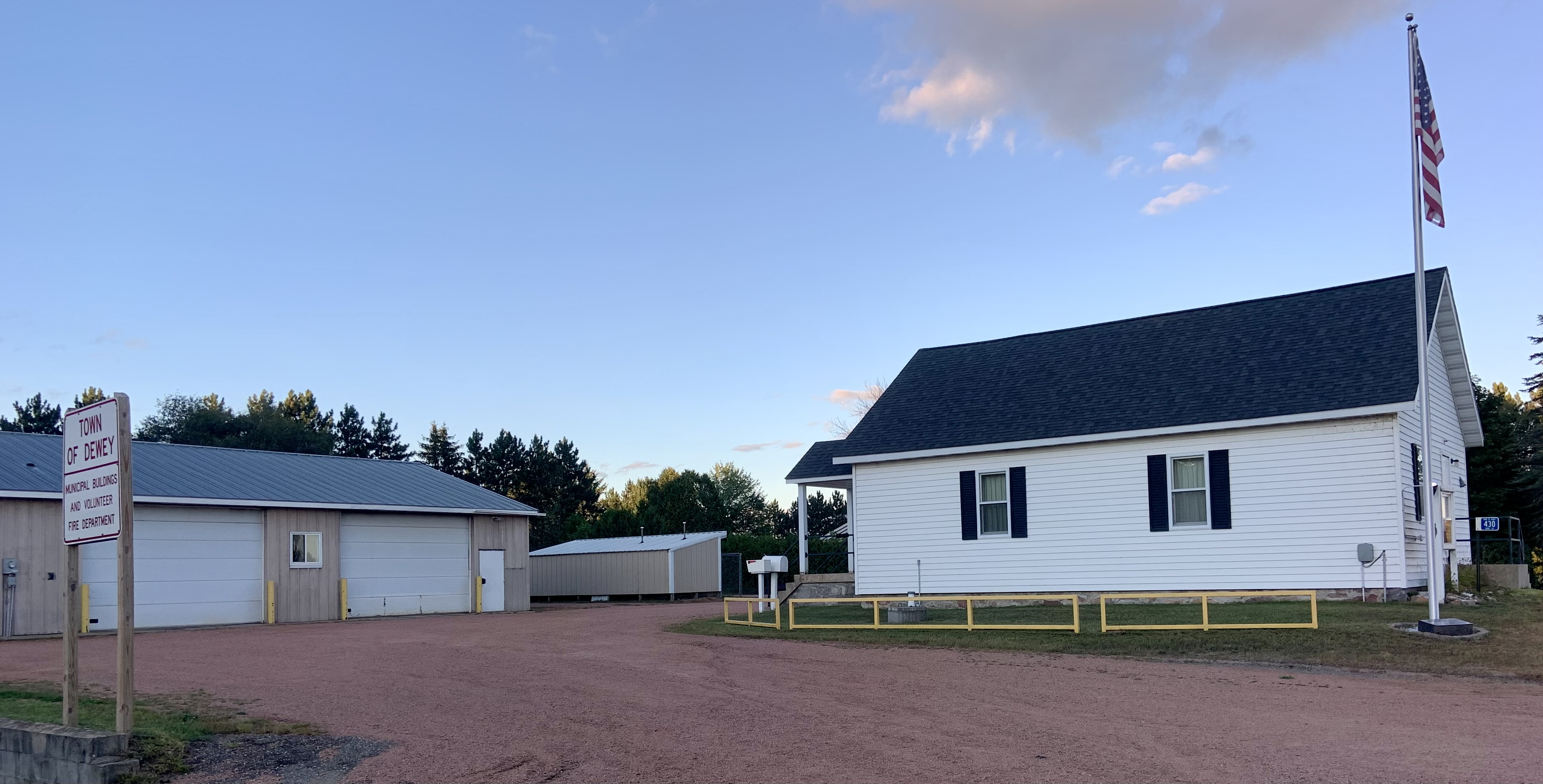
- Town hall

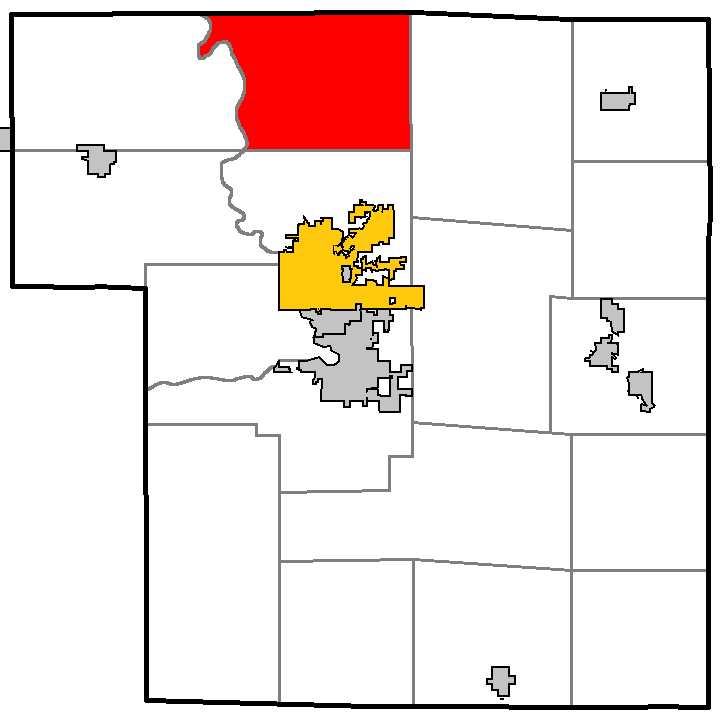
- Location of Dewey, Portage County, Wisconsin

- Location of Portage County, Wisconsin
- Coordinates: 44°38′20″N 89°34′33″W
- Country: United States
- State: Wisconsin
- County: Portage

Area
  - Total: 47.0 sq mi (121.8 km^{2})
  - Land: 45.3 sq mi (117.3 km^{2})
  - Water: 1.7 sq mi (4.5 km^{2})
- Elevation: 1,138 ft (347 m)

Population (2020)
  - Total: 962
  - Density: 21.2/sq mi (8.20/km^{2})
- Time zone: UTC-6 (Central (CST))
  - Summer (DST): UTC-5 (CDT)
- Area codes: 715 & 534
- FIPS code: 55-19975
- GNIS feature ID: 1583080
- Website: https://townofdewey.wi.gov/

Dewey is a town in Portage County, Wisconsin, United States. The population was 962 at the 2020 census. The unincorporated community of Torun is located in the town.

The Town of Dewey was founded in 1898, and is named for George Dewey, naval admiral victorious at the Battle of Manila Bay that year.

== Geography ==
According to the United States Census Bureau, the town has a total area of 47.0 square miles (121.8 km^{2}), of which 45.3 square miles (117.3 km^{2}) is land and 1.7 square miles (4.5 km^{2}) (3.70%) is water.

== Demographics ==
As of the census of 2000, there were 975 people, 356 households, and 271 families residing in the town. The population density was 21.5 people per square mile (8.3/km^{2}). There were 378 housing units at an average density of 8.3 per square mile (3.2/km^{2}). The racial makeup of the town was 99.08% White, 0.10% African American, 0.62% from other races, and 0.21% from two or more races. Hispanic or Latino of any race were 0.92% of the population.

There were 356 households, out of which 34.3% had children under the age of 18 living with them, 70.5% were married couples living together, 3.4% had a female householder with no husband present, and 23.6% were non-families. 18.5% of all households were made up of individuals, and 5.3% had someone living alone who was 65 years of age or older. The average household size was 2.74 and the average family size was 3.15.

In the town, the population was spread out, with 24.3% under the age of 18, 8.8% from 18 to 24, 31.4% from 25 to 44, 25.9% from 45 to 64, and 9.5% who were 65 years of age or older. The median age was 37 years. For every 100 females, there were 107.4 males. For every 100 females age 18 and over, there were 113.3 males.

The median income for a household in the town was $50,391, and the median income for a family was $60,294. Males had a median income of $37,132 versus $23,889 for females. The per capita income for the town was $24,623. About 2.9% of families and 6.9% of the population were below the poverty line, including 11.6% of those under age 18 and 1.0% of those age 65 or over.

== Notable people ==
- John Baptiste DuBay, fur trader

== State wildlife refuge ==
- The Dewey Marsh state wildlife refuge is located in the town.
