= Dewey, Missouri =

Extinct hamlet in Missouri, U.S.

Coordinates: 37°40′03″N 93°15′56″W

Dewey is an extinct town in Polk County, in the U.S. state of Missouri.

A post office called Dewey was established in 1898, and remained in operation until 1906. The community has the name of George Dewey, an officer in the Spanish–American War.
