= USS Dewey =

USS Dewey may refer to one of these ships of the United States Navy named in honor of Admiral George Dewey, best known for his victory at the Battle of Manila Bay during the Spanish–American War:

- USS Dewey (YFD-1), a floating drydock at U.S. Naval Base Subic Bay in the Philippines until being scuttled in 1942
- USS Dewey (DD-349), a 1934 Farragut-class destroyer, launched in 1934 and struck in 1945
- USS Dewey (DDG-45), a 1958 Farragut-class guided missile destroyer, launched in 1958 and struck in 1992
- USS Dewey (DDG-105), an Arleigh Burke-class destroyer, commissioned in 2010
