= Thomas E. Dewey =

American politician (1902–1971)

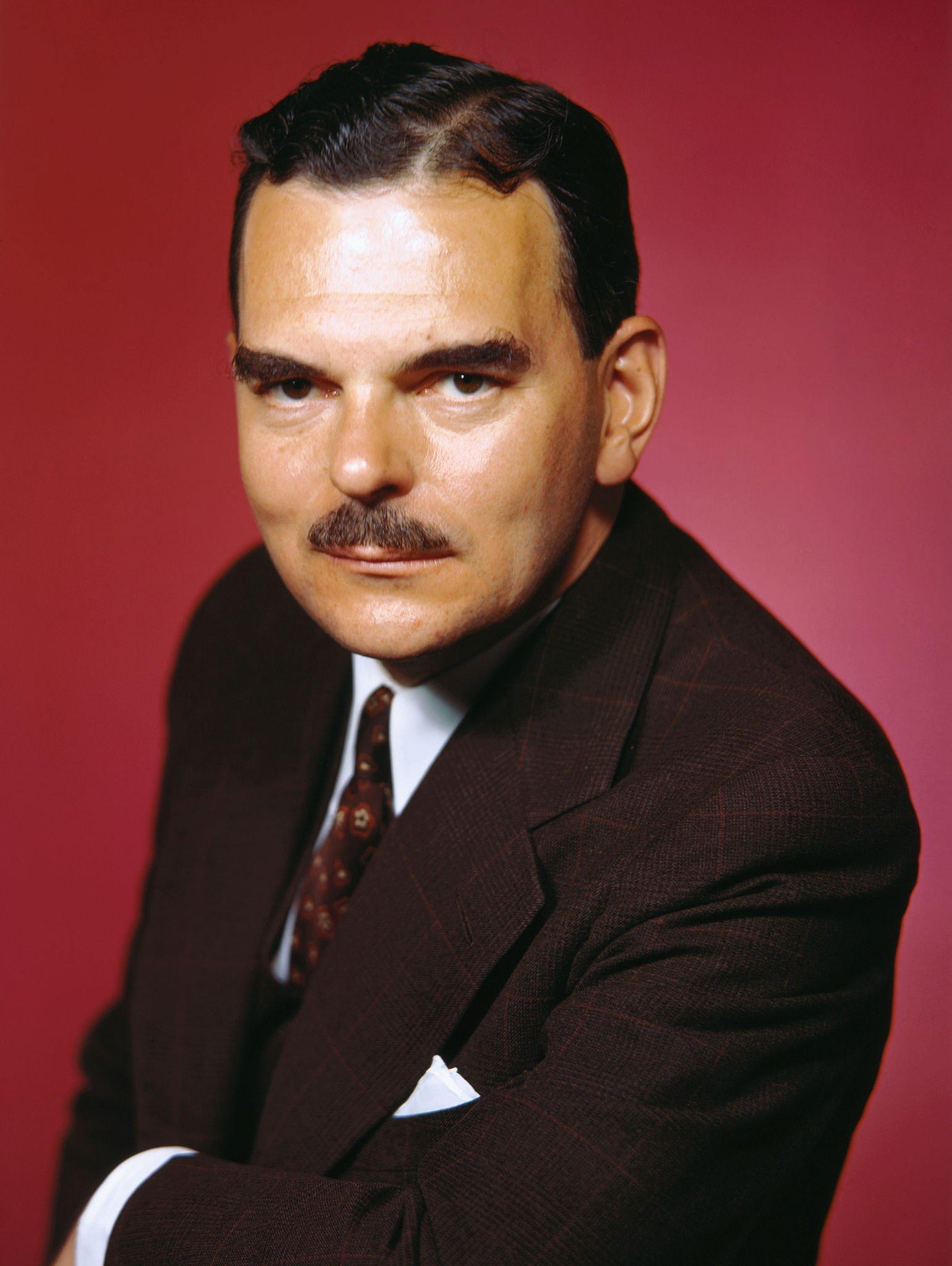
- Dewey in 1944

47th Governor of New York
- In office January 1, 1943 – December 31, 1954
- Lieutenant: Thomas W. Wallace; Joe R. Hanley; Frank C. Moore; Arthur H. Wicks (acting); Walter J. Mahoney (acting)
- Preceded by: Charles Poletti
- Succeeded by: W. Averell Harriman

33rd District Attorney of New York County
- In office January 1, 1938 – December 31, 1941
- Governor: Herbert H. Lehman
- Preceded by: William C. Dodge
- Succeeded by: Frank Hogan

United States Attorney for the Southern District of New York
- Acting; November 22, 1933 – December 26, 1933
- President: Franklin D. Roosevelt
- Preceded by: George Z. Medalie
- Succeeded by: Martin Conboy

Personal details
- Born: Thomas Edmund Dewey; March 24, 1902 Owosso, Michigan, U.S.
- Died: March 16, 1971 (aged 68) Miami, Florida, U.S.
- Party: Republican
- Spouse: Frances Hutt (m. 1928; died 1970)
- Children: 2, including Thomas Jr.
- Education: University of Michigan (BA); Columbia University (LLB)

Thomas Edmund Dewey (March 24, 1902 – March 16, 1971) was an American lawyer and politician who served as the 47th governor of New York from 1943 to 1954. He was the Republican Party's nominee for president of the United States in 1944 and 1948, respectively losing these elections to Democratic presidents Franklin D. Roosevelt and Harry S. Truman.

As a New York City prosecutor and District Attorney in the 1930s and early 1940s, Dewey was relentless in his effort to curb the power of the American Mafia and of organized crime in general. Most famously, he successfully prosecuted Mafia boss Charles "Lucky" Luciano on charges of forced prostitution in 1936. Luciano was given a 30- to 50-year prison sentence. He also prosecuted and convicted Waxey Gordon, another prominent New York City gangster and bootlegger, on charges of tax evasion. Dewey almost succeeded in apprehending mobster Dutch Schultz as well, but Schultz was murdered in 1935, in a hit ordered by the Commission.

A progressive conservative, Dewey led the moderate faction of the Republican Party during the 1940s and 1950s, in opposition to the more conservative Ohio Senator Robert A. Taft.

Dewey served as the 47th governor of New York from 1943 to 1954. When running against incumbent Franklin D. Roosevelt in 1944, he came the closest among Roosevelt's four presidential election opponents. Dewey won the Republican presidential nomination again in 1948; defeating Harold Stassen on his left and Robert A. Taft on his right. However, he lost to President Harry S. Truman in one of the greatest upsets in presidential election history. Dewey played a large role in winning the Republican presidential nomination for Dwight D. Eisenhower in 1952, helping Eisenhower win the presidential election later that year. He also played a large part in the choice of Richard Nixon as the Republican vice-presidential nominee in 1952 and 1956. He was the first major party nominee to have been born in the 20th century.

Following his political retirement, Dewey served from 1955 to 1971 as a corporate lawyer and senior partner in his law firm Dewey Ballantine in New York City. In March 1971, while on a golfing vacation in Miami, Florida, he died from a heart attack. Following a public memorial ceremony at St. James' Episcopal Church in New York City, Dewey was buried in the town cemetery of Pawling, New York.

Dewey once described his career in public life as that of "a political engineer ... a conservative facing up to the political facts of life."

== Early life and family ==
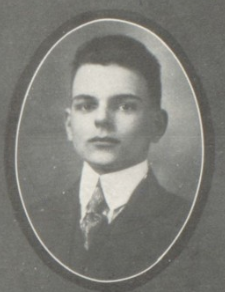
Dewey at Owosso High School, 1919

Thomas Edmund Dewey was born and raised in Owosso, Michigan, where his father, George Martin Dewey, owned, edited, and published the local newspaper, the Owosso Times. His mother, Annie (Thomas), whom he called "Mater", bequeathed her son "a headstrong assertiveness that many took for conceit, a set of small-town values never entirely erased by exposure to the sophisticated East, and a sense of proportion that moderated triumph and eased defeat". One journalist noted that as a boy "he did show leadership and ambition above the average; by the time he was thirteen, he had a crew of nine other youngsters working for him" selling newspapers and magazines in Owosso. In his senior year in high school he was the president of his class and the chief editor of the school yearbook. His senior caption in the yearbook stated "First in the council hall to steer the state, and ever foremost in a tongue debate", and a biographer wrote that "the bent of his mind, from his earliest days, was towards debate". He received his B.A. degree from the University of Michigan in 1923, and his LL.B. degree from Columbia Law School in 1925.

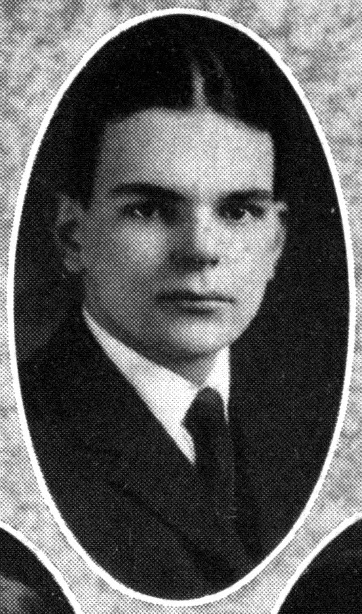
Dewey in the University of Michigan yearbook, 1923

While at the University of Michigan, Dewey joined Phi Mu Alpha Sinfonia, a national fraternity for men of music, and was a member of the Men's Glee Club. While growing up in Owosso he was a member of the choir at Christ Episcopal Church. He had a deep baritone voice, and in 1923 he finished in third place in the National Singing Contest. He briefly considered a career as a professional singer but decided against it after a temporary throat ailment convinced him that such a career would be risky. He then decided to pursue a career as a lawyer. He also wrote for The Michigan Daily, the university's student newspaper.

On June 16, 1928, Dewey married Frances Eileen Hutt. They had met in Chicago in 1923, during a summer singing course taught by Percy Rector Stephens. A native of Sherman, Texas, who was raised in Sherman and in Sapulpa, Oklahoma, she was valedictorian of her 1920 high school class. Hutt was a singer and stage actress; after their marriage she dropped her stage career. They had two sons, Thomas E. Dewey Jr. and John Martin Dewey.

Although Dewey served as a prosecutor and District Attorney in New York City for many years, his home from 1939 until his death was a large farm, called "Dapplemere", near the town of Pawling some 65 miles (105 km) north of New York City. According to biographer Richard Norton Smith, Dewey "loved Dapplemere as [he did] no other place", and Dewey was once quoted as saying that "I work like a horse five days and five nights a week for the privilege of getting to the country on the weekend." In 1945 Dewey told a reporter, "My farm is my roots ... the heart of this nation is the rural small town." Dapplemere was part of a tight-knit rural community called Quaker Hill, which was known as a haven for the prominent and well-to-do. Among Dewey's neighbors on Quaker Hill were reporter and radio broadcaster Lowell Thomas, the Reverend Norman Vincent Peale, and CBS News journalist Edward R. Murrow.

During his twelve years as governor, Dewey also kept a New York City residence and office in the Roosevelt Hotel. Dewey was an active, lifelong member of the Episcopal Church.

Dewey was a lifelong Republican, and in the 1920s and 1930s, he was a party worker in New York City, eventually rising to become Chair of The New York Young Republican Club in 1931. When asked in 1946 why he was a Republican, Dewey replied, "I believe that the Republican Party is the best instrument for bringing sound government into the hands of competent men and by this means preserving our liberties ... But there is another reason why I am a Republican. I was born one."

== Prosecutor ==
=== Federal prosecutor ===
Dewey first served as a federal prosecutor, then started a private practice on Wall Street. He left his practice for an appointment as special prosecutor to look into corruption in New York City with the title of Chief Assistant U.S. Attorney for the Southern District of New York. It was in this role that he first achieved headlines in the early 1930s when he prosecuted bootlegger Waxey Gordon.

Dewey had used his recall of details of crimes to trip up witnesses as a federal prosecutor; as a state prosecutor, he used telephone taps (which were legal at the time per Olmstead v. United States, 1928) to gather evidence, with the goal of bringing down entire criminal organizations. On that account, Dewey successfully lobbied for an overhaul in New York's criminal procedure law, which at that time required separate trials for each count of an indictment. Dewey's thoroughness and attention to detail became legendary; for one case he and his staff sifted "through 100,000 telephone slips to convict a Prohibition-era bootlegger."

=== Special prosecutor ===
In 1935, Dewey was appointed special prosecutor in New York County (Manhattan) by Governor Herbert H. Lehman. A "runaway grand jury" had publicly complained that William C. Dodge, the District Attorney, was not aggressively pursuing the mob and political corruption. Lehman, to avoid charges of partisanship, asked four Republicans to serve as special prosecutor. All four refused and recommended Dewey.

Dewey recruited a staff of more than sixty assistants, investigators, process servers, stenographers, and clerks. New York Mayor Fiorello H. La Guardia assigned a hand-picked squad of 63 police officers to Dewey's office. Dewey's targets were organized racketeering: the large-scale criminal enterprises, especially extortion, the numbers racket, and prostitution. One writer said: "Dewey ... put on a very impressive show. All the paraphernalia, the hideouts and tapped telephones and so on, became famous. What he appealed to most was the great American love of results. People were much more interested in his ends than in his means. Another key to all this may be expressed in a single word: honesty. Dewey was honest."

One of his biggest prizes was gangster Dutch Schultz, whom he had battled as both a federal and state prosecutor. Schultz's first trial ended in a deadlock; prior to his second trial, Schultz had the venue moved to Malone, New York, then moved there and garnered the sympathy of the townspeople through charitable acts so that when it came time for his trial, the jury found him not guilty, liking him too much to convict him.

Dewey and La Guardia threatened Schultz with instant arrest and further charges. Schultz now proposed to murder Dewey, who would be killed while he made his daily morning call to his office from a pay phone near his home. However, New York crime boss Lucky Luciano and the "Mafia Commission" decided that Dewey's murder would provoke an all-out crackdown. Instead they had Schultz killed. Schultz was shot to death in the restroom of a bar in Newark.

Dewey's legal team turned their attention to Lucky Luciano. Assistant DA Eunice Carter oversaw investigations into prostitution racketeering. She raided 80 houses of prostitution in the New York City area and arrested hundreds of prostitutes and madams. Carter had developed trust with many of these women, and through her coaching, many of the arrested prostitutes – some of whom told of being beaten and abused by Mafia thugs – were willing to testify to avoid prison time. Three implicated Luciano as controller of organized prostitution in the New York/New Jersey area, one of the largest prostitution rings in American history. Carter's investigation was the first to link Luciano to a crime. Dewey prosecuted the case, and in the greatest victory of his legal career, he won the conviction of Luciano for the prostitution racket, with a sentence of 30 to 50 years on June 18, 1936. In January 1946, now New York Governor, Dewey commuted Luciano's sentence due to his help to the US government in Operation Underworld. He was released and deported.

In January 1937, Dewey successfully prosecuted Tootsie Herbert, the leader of New York's poultry racket, for embezzlement. Following his conviction, New York's poultry "marketplace returned to normal, and New York consumers saved $5 million in 1938 alone". That same month, Dewey, his staff, and New York City police made a series of raids that led to the arrest of 65 of New York's leading operators in various rackets, including the bakery racket, numbers racket, and restaurant racket. The New York Times ran an editorial praising Dewey for breaking up the "shadow government" of New York's racketeers, and The Philadelphia Inquirer wrote "If you don't think Dewey is Public Hero No. 1, listen to the applause he gets every time he is shown in a newsreel."

=== Manhattan District Attorney ===
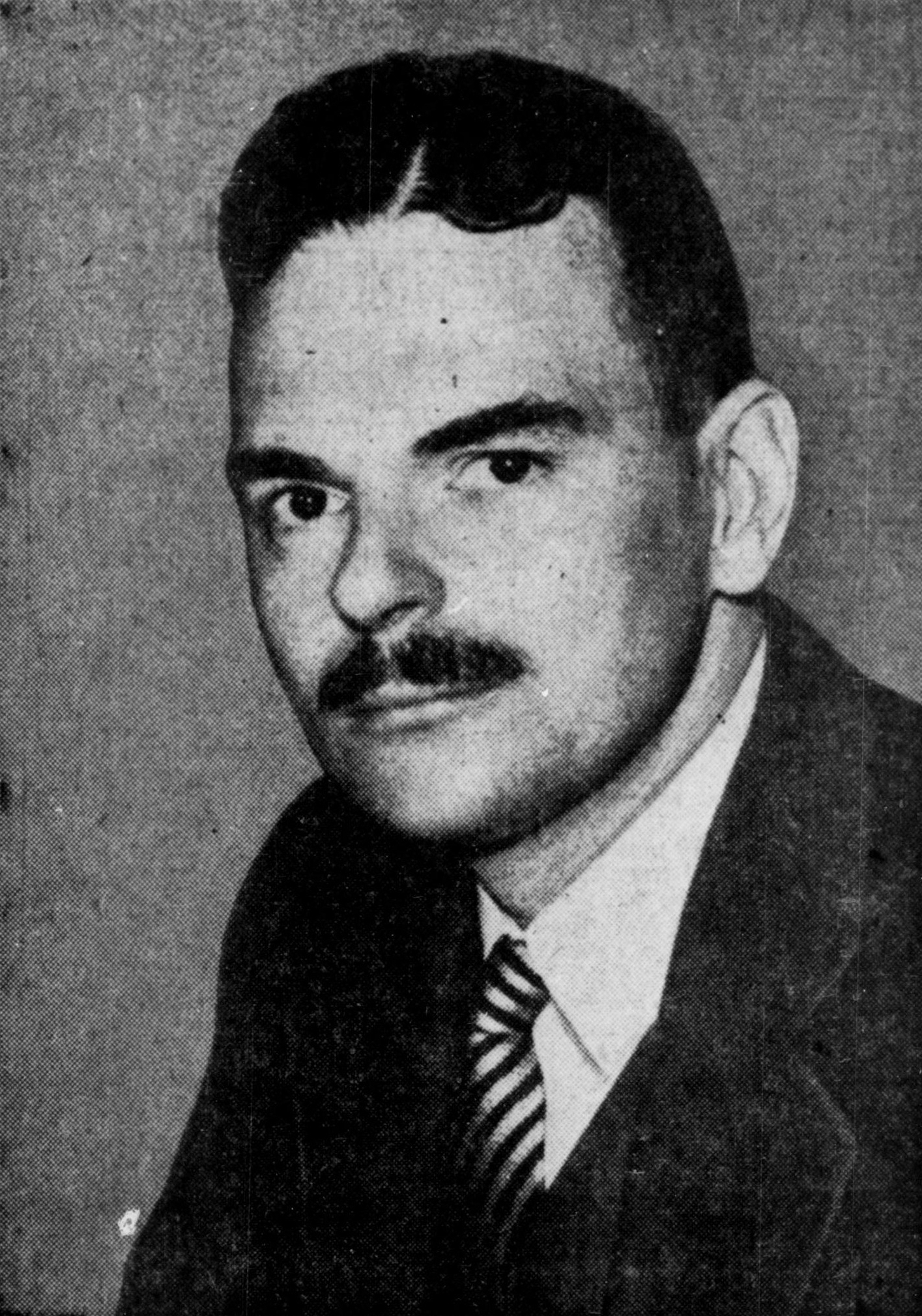
Portrait by The New York Times, 1937

In 1937, Dewey was elected New York County District Attorney (Manhattan), defeating the Democratic nominee after Dodge decided not to run for re-election. Dewey was such a popular candidate for District Attorney that "election officials in Brooklyn posted large signs at polling places reading 'Dewey Isn't Running in This County'."

As District Attorney, Dewey successfully prosecuted and convicted Richard Whitney, former president of the New York Stock Exchange, for embezzlement. Whitney was given a five-year prison sentence. Dewey also successfully prosecuted Tammany Hall political boss James Joseph Hines on thirteen counts of racketeering. Following the favorable national publicity he received after his conviction of Hines, a May 1939 Gallup poll showed Dewey as the frontrunner for the 1940 Republican presidential nomination, and gave him a lead of 58% to 42% over President Franklin D. Roosevelt in a potential 1940 presidential campaign. In 1939, Dewey also tried and convicted American Nazi leader Fritz Julius Kuhn for embezzlement, crippling Kuhn's organization and limiting its ability to support Nazi Germany in World War II.

During his four years as District Attorney, Dewey and his staff compiled a 94 percent conviction rate of defendants brought to trial, created new bureaus for Fraud, Rackets, and Juvenile Detention, and led an investigation into tenement houses with inadequate fire safety features that reduced "their number from 13,000 to 3,500" in a single year. When he left the District Attorney's office in 1942 to run for governor, Dewey said, "It has been learned in high places that clean government can also be good politics ... I don't like Republican thieves any more than Democratic ones."

By the late 1930s Dewey's successful efforts against organized crime, and especially his conviction of Lucky Luciano, had turned him into a national celebrity. His nickname, the "Gangbuster", was used for the popular 1930s Gang Busters radio series based on his fight against the mob. Hollywood film studios made several movies inspired by his exploits; Marked Woman starred Humphrey Bogart as a Dewey-like DA and Bette Davis as a "party girl" whose testimony helps convict the mob boss. A popular story from the time, possibly apocryphal, featured a young girl who told her father that she wanted to sue God to stop a prolonged spell of rain. When her father replied "you can't sue God and win", the girl said "I can if Dewey is my lawyer."

== Governor of New York ==
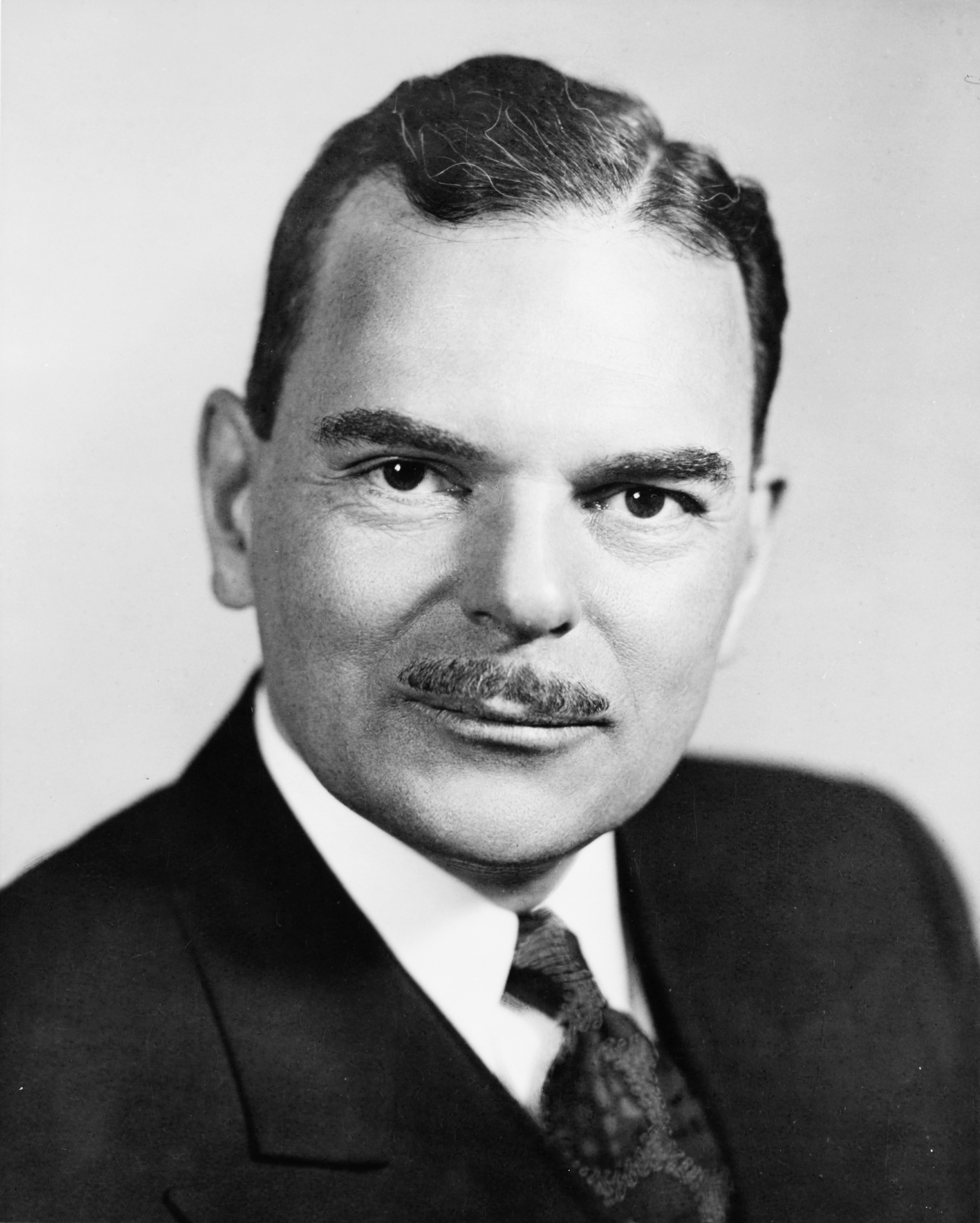
Dewey's portrait as governor in 1948

In 1984, journalists Neal Peirce and Jerry Hagstrom summarized Dewey's governorship by saying, "For sheer administrative talent, it is difficult to think of a twentieth-century governor who has excelled Thomas E. Dewey ... hundreds of thousands of New York youngsters owe Dewey thanks for his leadership in creating a state university ... a vigorous health-department program virtually eradicated tuberculosis in New York, highway building was pushed forward, and the state's mental hygiene program was thoroughly reorganized." Dewey also created a powerful political organization that allowed him to dominate New York state politics and influence national politics.

=== Elections ===
In 1938 Edwin Jaeckle, the New York Republican Party Chairman, selected Dewey to run for Governor of New York against the Democratic incumbent, Herbert H. Lehman. Dewey was only 36 years of age. He based his campaign on his record as a famous prosecutor of organized-crime figures in New York City. Although he was defeated, Dewey's surprisingly strong showing against the popular Lehman (he lost by only 1.4%) brought him national political attention and made him a front runner for the 1940 Republican presidential nomination.

Jaeckle was one of Dewey's top advisors and mentors for the remainder of his political career.

In 1942, Dewey ran for governor again and won with a large plurality over Democrat John J. Bennett Jr., the outgoing state attorney general. Bennett was not endorsed by the American Labor Party, whose candidate, Dean Alfange, drew almost ten percent of the ballots cast. The ALP endorsed for re-election incumbent lieutenant governor Charles Poletti, who lost narrowly to Dewey's running mate Thomas W. Wallace.

In 1946, Dewey was re-elected by the greatest margin in state history to that point, almost 700,000 votes.

In 1950, he was elected to a third term by 572,000 votes. He had originally declared his intent to forgo re-election in 1950, but had been persuaded by other Republicans to run for a third term in hopes of boosting the Republican Party in New York ahead of the 1952 presidential election.

=== Policies ===
Remembered as "an odd mix, a pay-as-you-go liberal and a compassionate conservative" and usually regarded as an honest and highly effective governor, Dewey doubled state aid to education, increased salaries for state employees and still reduced the state's debt by more than $100 million. He referred to his program as "pay-as-you-go liberalism ... government can be progressive and solvent at the same time." Additionally he put through the Ives-Quinn Act of 1945, the first state law in the country that prohibited racial discrimination in employment. As governor, Dewey signed legislation that created the State University of New York. Shortly after becoming governor in 1943, Dewey learned that some state workers and teachers were being paid only $900 a year, leading him to give "hefty raises, some as high as 150%" to state workers and teachers.

Dewey played a leading role in securing support and funding for the New York State Thruway, which was eventually named in his honor. Dewey also streamlined and consolidated many state agencies to make them more efficient. During the Second World War construction in New York was limited, which allowed Dewey to create a $623 million budget surplus, which he placed into his "Postwar Reconstruction Fund." The fund would eventually create 14,000 new beds in the state's mental health system, provide public housing for 30,000 families, allow for the reforestation of 34 million trees, create a water pollution program, provide slum clearance, and pay for a "model veterans' program." His governorship was also "friendlier by far than his [Democratic] predecessors to the private sector", as Dewey created a state Department of Commerce to "lure new businesses and tourists to the Empire State, ease the shift from wartime boom, and steer small businessmen, in particular, through the maze of federal regulation and restriction." Between 1945 and 1948, 135,000 new businesses were started in New York.

Dewey supported the decision of the New York legislature to end state funding for child care centers, which were established during the war. The child care centers allowed mothers to participate in wartime industries. The state was forced to provide funding for local communities that could not obtain money under the Lanham Act. Although working mothers, helped by various civic and social groups, fought to retain funding, federal support for child care facilities was considered temporary and ended on March 1, 1946. New York state aid to child care ended on January 1, 1948. When protesters asked Dewey to keep the child care centers open, he called them "Communists".

He strongly supported the death penalty. During his twelve years as governor, more than ninety people were electrocuted under New York authority. Among these were several of the mob-affiliated hitmen belonging to the murder-for-hire group Murder, Inc., which was headed up by major mob leaders Louis "Lepke" Buchalter and Albert Anastasia. Buchalter himself went to the chair in 1944.

Dewey was a believer in conservatism reaching out to all classes in society, expressing his belief to Winston Churchill in 1946 that "Somehow the conservative forces must relearn how to establish close relationships ... among all the classes of people" and arguing that more would have to be done "if we are going to keep trade union leaders from pushing us steadily into socialism and its inevitable ... loss of personal liberty."

According to one study

Dewey was a fiscal conservative but believed that Republicans should not attempt to repeal the New Deal; rather, they should advance competing social welfare programs that emphasized individual freedom and economic incentives instead of the Democrats' tendency towards centralization and collectivism.

This was reflected in a statement made by Dewey in 1950, when he noted how recent victories of conservatives in Australia and New Zealand were due to "the firmest assurances that they would retain the welfare provisions made by their opponents". Although Dewey was opposed to what he called "the galloping socialism of big government", and in the previous year had spoken out against what he called "the self-feeding, ever-growing, nobody-can-feed-you-but-us philosophy of the welfare state", he was critical of the "welfare state" label's being applied to the Truman Administration, arguing that anyone "who thinks that an attack of the fundamental idea of security and welfare is appealing to the people generally is living in the Middle Ages".

In 1949, Dewey expressed concern with what he called increasing government interference with individuals, arguing that "the more we have the more it becomes accepted" and spoke out against both socialized medicine (which he believed Harry Truman's health reform plan represented) and the Brannan Plan for agriculture; arguing that the former would represent "the first step toward a socialized state" while the latter would turn American farmers into "serfs". During a Lincoln Day event in February 1949, Dewey presented himself as standing in the center between Republicans who opposed anything that they interpreted as "paternalism" and those Republicans who "seem to embrace the entire New Deal and want to go far beyond it as rapidly as possible at almost any cost and regardless of consequences". He also criticized the program advanced by the Democrats, arguing that there was nothing in that program that was "opposed to the belief that they intend to lead us into a system where everything man gets from cradle to grave is doled out to him by a ruling political clique".

In a lecture he delivered in April 1950, Dewey argued that while Republicans agreed the need for basic services that should be provided by government to its people, he drew a line between Democrats and Republicans in their approach to government, arguing that the choice was between "the Democratic party of big government and the Republican way of local rule and individual freedom". Dewey also criticized Democrats for believing that "only the federal government could solve the people's problems and only with federal funds, federal personnel and federal controls". At the same time, Dewey attacked what he called "unrepresentative members" of the Republican Party who regarded property rights as superior to labor rights, arguing that "no Republican president – from Abraham Lincoln to Herbert Hoover – ever endorsed so reactionary a position".

A Dewey biographer said of Dewey that "No doubt he was a conservative [but] he was also realistic." A Republican Party campaign advertisement from 1944 described Dewey as "far from the Left-wingers of the New Deal as he is from the standpat reactionaries."

Dewey was a Zionist. In October 1945, he spoke at a rally in Madison Square Garden, calling for the lifting of British restrictions on Jewish immigration to Mandatory Palestine.

== Presidential campaigns ==
=== 1940 ===
Dewey sought the 1940 Republican presidential nomination. He was considered the early favorite for the nomination, but his support ebbed in the late spring of 1940 as Nazi Germany invaded its neighbors, and Americans feared being drawn into another European war.

Some Republican leaders considered Dewey to be too young (at 38, just three years above the minimum age required by the US Constitution) and too inexperienced to lead the nation in wartime. Furthermore, Dewey's non-interventionist stance became problematic when Germany quickly conquered France and seemed poised to invade Britain. As a result, at the 1940 Republican National Convention many delegates switched from Dewey to dark horse candidate Wendell Willkie, who was a decade older and supported aid to the Allies fighting Germany. Dewey led on the first ballot, but was well below the vote total he needed to win. He steadily lost strength to Willkie in succeeding ballots, and Willkie was unexpectedly nominated on the convention's sixth ballot despite having no previous political experience and having only joined the Republican Party a year prior. Willkie ultimately lost in a landslide to Franklin D. Roosevelt in the general election.

=== 1944 ===
Dewey's foreign-policy position evolved during the 1940s; by 1944 he was considered an internationalist and a supporter of projects such as the United Nations. It was in 1940 that Dewey first clashed with Robert A. Taft. Taft, who maintained his non-interventionist views and economic conservatism to his death, became Dewey's great rival for control of the Republican Party in the 1940s and early 1950s. Dewey became the leader of moderate Republicans, who were based in the Eastern states, while Taft became the leader of conservative Republicans who dominated most of the Midwest.

Dewey was the frontrunner for the 1944 Republican nomination. In April 1944 he won the key Wisconsin primary, where he defeated Wendell Willkie and former Minnesota governor Harold Stassen. Willkie's poor showing in Wisconsin forced him to quit the race and he died later that year. At the 1944 Republican Convention, Dewey's chief rivals (Stassen and Ohio governor John W. Bricker) both withdrew and Dewey was nominated almost unanimously. Dewey then made Bricker (who was supported by Taft) his running mate. This made Dewey the first presidential candidate to be born in the 20th century. As of 2026, he was also the youngest Republican presidential nominee.

In the general election campaign, Dewey crusaded against the alleged inefficiencies, corruption and Communist influences in incumbent president Roosevelt's New Deal programs, but mostly avoided military and foreign policy debates. Dewey had considered including the conspiracy theory that Roosevelt knew about the attack on Pearl Harbor beforehand and allowed it to happen and to say: "... and instead of being re-elected he should be impeached." The allegation would have suggested the then-secret fact that the U.S. had broken the Purple code still in use by the Japanese military. Dewey eventually yielded to Army Chief of Staff George C. Marshall's urging not to touch this topic. Marshall informed Harry Hopkins of his action in late October that year; Hopkins then told the president. Roosevelt reasoned that "Dewey would not, for political purposes, give secret and vital information to the enemy."

During the campaign, in a first, Roosevelt provided Dewey with information on the war efforts, such as the breaking of Japanese naval code. This was the first time that an opposition presidential candidate was given briefings by the incumbent presidential administration.

Dewey lost the election on November 7, 1944, to President Roosevelt. He had polled 45.9% of the popular vote compared to Roosevelt's 53.4%, a stronger showing against FDR than any previous Republican opponent. In the Electoral College, Roosevelt defeated Dewey by a margin of 432 to 99.

=== 1948 ===
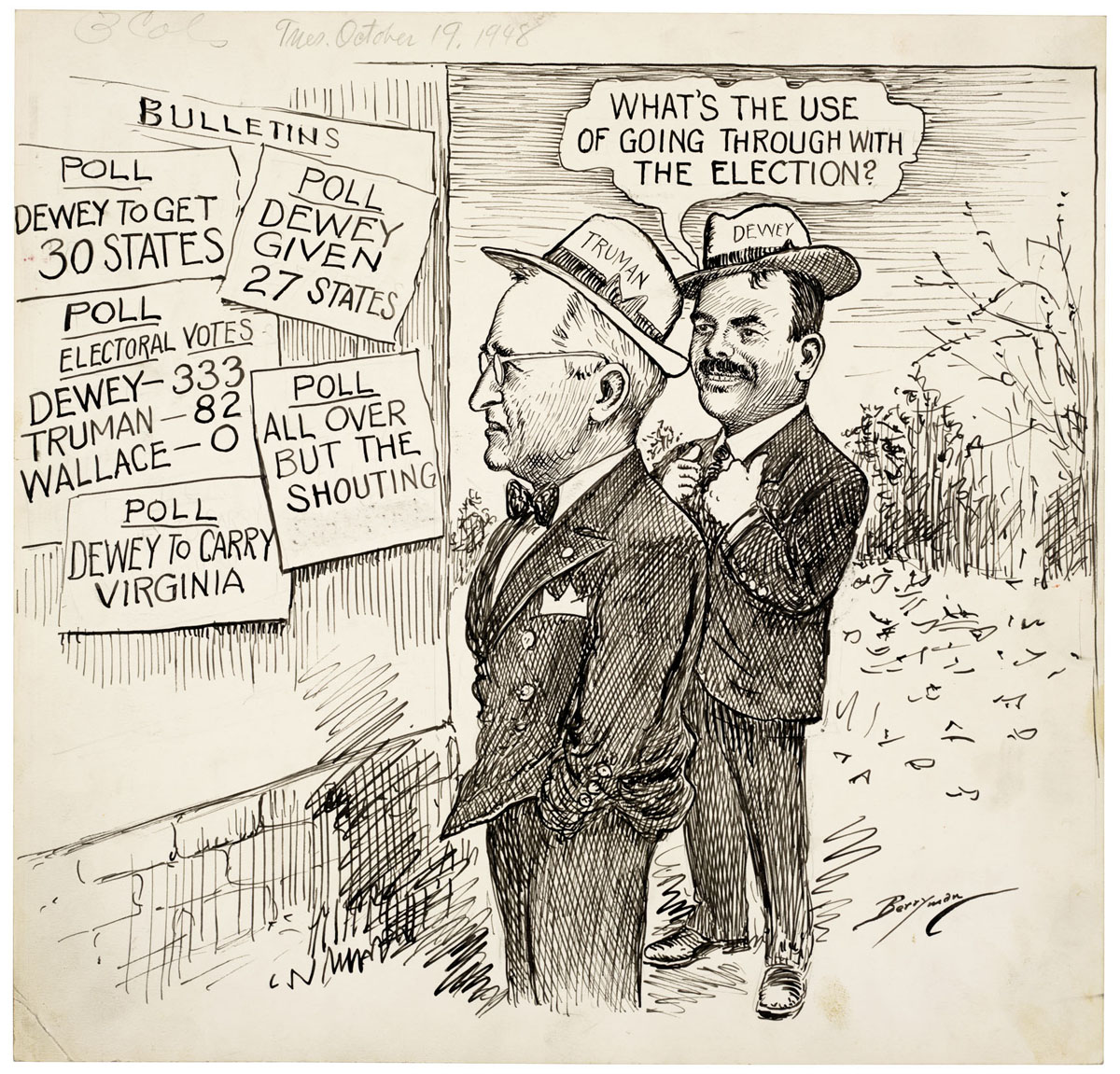
Clifford K. Berryman's editorial cartoon of October 19, 1948, shows the consensus of experts in mid-October

Dewey was the Republican candidate again in the 1948 presidential election, with California governor and future Chief Justice of the United States Earl Warren on the bottom half of the ticket. Dewey was almost unanimously projected to win against incumbent Harry S. Truman, who had taken over from FDR when he died in office in 1945.

During the primaries, Dewey was repeatedly urged to engage in red-baiting, but he refused. In a debate before the Oregon primary with Harold Stassen, Dewey argued against outlawing the Communist Party of the United States of America, saying "you can't shoot an idea with a gun." He later told Styles Bridges, the Republican national campaign manager, that he was not "going around looking under beds".

Given Truman's sinking popularity and the Democratic Party's three-way split (the left-winger Henry A. Wallace and the Southern segregationist Strom Thurmond ran third-party campaigns), Dewey seemed unbeatable to the point that the Republicans believed all they had to do to win was to avoid making any major mistakes.

Following this advice, Dewey carefully avoided risks and spoke in platitudes, avoiding controversial issues, and remained vague on what he planned to do as president, with speech after speech being nonpartisan and also filled with optimistic assertions or empty statements of the obvious, including the famous quote: "You know that your future is still ahead of you." An editorial in the Louisville Courier-Journal summed it up:

No presidential candidate in the future will be so inept that four of his major speeches can be boiled down to these historic four sentences: Agriculture is important. Our rivers are full of fish. You cannot have freedom without liberty. Our future lies ahead.

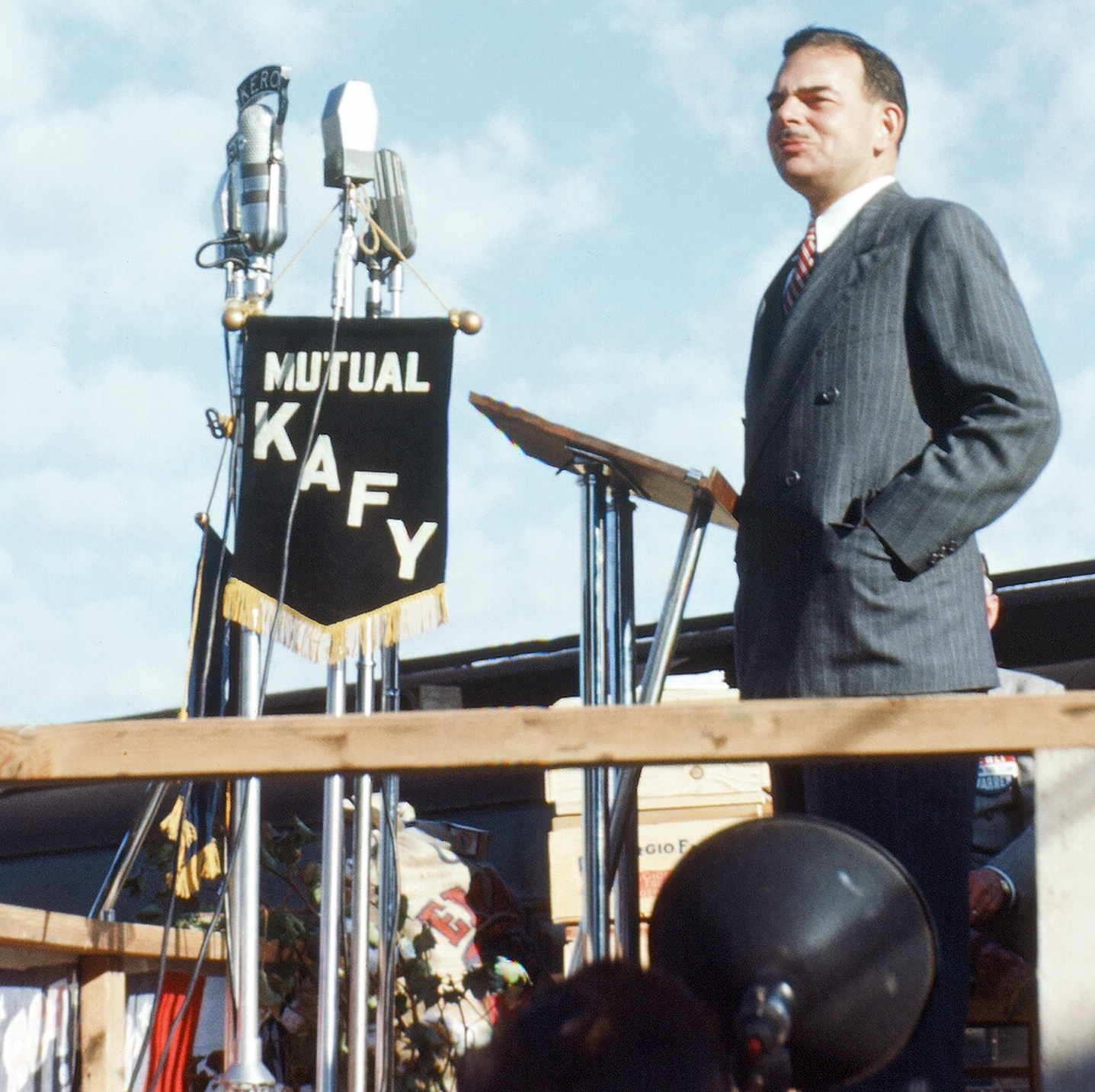
Dewey on the campaign trail in Bakersfield, California, September 1948

Another reason Dewey ran such a cautious, vague campaign came from his experience as a presidential candidate in 1944, where Dewey felt that he had allowed Roosevelt to draw him into a partisan, verbal "mudslinging" match, and he believed that this had cost him votes.

Dewey was accordingly convinced in 1948 to appear as non-partisan as possible, and to emphasize the positive aspects of his campaign while ignoring his opponent: this strategy proved to be a total failure, as it allowed Truman to repeatedly criticize and ridicule Dewey, who never answered any of Truman's criticisms.

Although Dewey was not as conservative as the Republican-controlled 80th Congress, the association proved problematic, as Truman tied Dewey to the "do-nothing" Congress.

Near the end of the campaign, Dewey considered adopting a more aggressive style and responding directly to Truman's criticisms, going so far as to tell his aides one evening that he wanted to "tear to shreds" a speech draft and make it more critical of the Democratic ticket. However, almost all his major advisors insisted that it would be a mistake to change tactics. Dewey's wife Frances strongly opposed her husband changing tactics, telling him, "If I have to stay up all night to see that you don't tear up that speech [draft], I will." Dewey relented and continued to ignore Truman's attacks and to focus on positive generalities instead of specific issues.

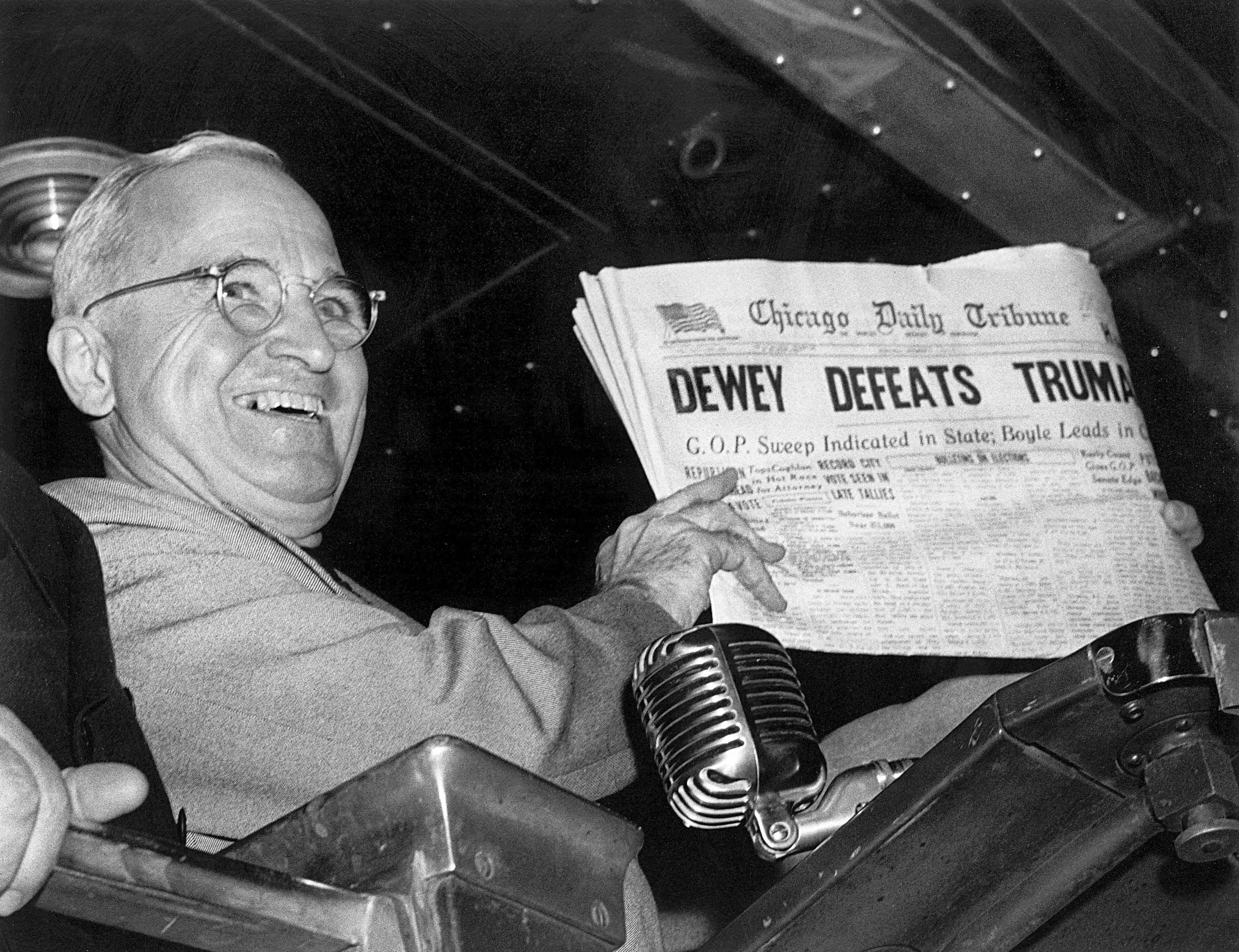
Actual winner Harry S. Truman, displaying early edition of the Chicago Tribune, which incorrectly stated that Dewey had won the 1948 presidential election.

Dewey received 45.1% of the popular vote to Truman's 49.6%. In the Electoral College, Dewey won 16 states with 189 electoral votes, Truman 28 states with 303 electoral votes, and Thurmond four states (all in the South) with 39 electoral votes. The key states in the election were Illinois, California, and Ohio, which together had a combined 78 electoral votes. Truman won each of these three states by less than one percentage point; had Dewey won all three states, he would have won the election in the Electoral College, and if he had any two, this would have forced a contingent election in the House of Representatives. Summarizing Dewey's campaign, a biographer wrote: "Dewey had swept the industrial Northeast, pared Democratic margins in the big cities by a third, run better than any Republican since Herbert Hoover in the South, and still lost decisively." After the election, Dewey told publisher Henry Luce that "you can analyze figures from now to kingdom come, and all they will show is that we lost the farm vote which we had in 1944 and that lost us the election."

A biographer noted that Dewey "rarely mentioned 1948 in the years thereafter. It was like a locked room in a musty mansion whose master never entered ... he seemed a bit bewildered at the unanimous front put up by his Albany advisers [during the campaign], regretted not having taken a final poll when his own senses detected slippage, and couldn't resist a potshot at 'that bastard Truman' for having successfully exploited farmers' fears of a new depression."

Pre-election planning by Dewey and his advisors for a potential presidential transition was much greater in 1948 than in any previous election cycle, and included selection by Dewey of potential cabinet officers. Though these efforts were ridiculed after Dewey was defeated, pre-election transition planning later became standard practice.

=== 1952 ===
Dewey did not run for president in 1952, but he played a key role in securing the Republican nomination for General Dwight D. Eisenhower. Taft was a candidate and, given his age, he freely admitted 1952 would be his last chance to win the presidency. Once Eisenhower clinched the nomination, Dewey used his powerful political machine to win Eisenhower the support of delegates in New York and elsewhere.

The 1952 campaign culminated in a climactic moment in the fierce rivalry between Dewey and Taft for control of the Republican Party. At the Republican Convention, pro-Taft delegates and speakers verbally attacked Dewey as the real power behind Eisenhower, but Dewey had the satisfaction of seeing Eisenhower win the nomination and end Taft's presidential hopes for the last time.

Dewey played a major role in helping California Senator Richard Nixon become Eisenhower's running mate. When Eisenhower won the presidency later that year, many of Dewey's closest aides and advisors became leading figures in the Eisenhower Administration. Among them were Herbert Brownell, who would become Eisenhower's Attorney General; James Hagerty, who would become White House Press Secretary; and John Foster Dulles, who would become Eisenhower's Secretary of State.

Dewey's campaign to secure the nomination for Eisenhower saw Dewey at odds with his two former running mates. 1948 vice presidential nominee Warren was a candidate for the presidential nomination, while 1944 running mate John W. Bricker backed Taft.

== Rivalry with Robert A. Taft ==
Dewey's biographer Richard Norton Smith wrote: "For fifteen years ... these two combatants waged political warfare. Their dispute pitted East against Midwest, city against countryside, internationalist against isolationist, pragmatic liberals against principled conservatives. Each man thought himself the genuine spokesman of the future; each denounced the other as a political heretic."

In a 1949 speech, Dewey criticized Taft and his followers by saying: "We have in our party some fine, high-minded patriotic people who honestly oppose farm price supports, unemployment insurance, old age benefits, slum clearance, and other social programs ... these people believe in a laissez-faire society and look back wistfully to the miscalled 'good old days' of the nineteenth century ... if such efforts to turn back the clock are actually pursued, you can bury the Republican Party as the deadest pigeon in the country." He added that people who opposed such social programs should "go out and try to get elected in a typical American community and see what happens to them. But they ought not to do it as Republicans."

In the speech, Dewey added that the Republican Party believed in social progress "under a flourishing, competitive system of private enterprise where every human right is expanded ... we are opposed to delivering the nation into the hands of any group who will have the power to tell the American people whether they may have food or fuel, shelter or jobs." Dewey believed in what he called "compassionate capitalism", and argued that "in the modern age, man's needs include as much economic security as is consistent with individual freedom." When Taft and his supporters criticized Dewey's policies as liberal "me-tooism", or "aping the New Deal in a vain attempt to outbid Roosevelt's heirs", Dewey responded that he was following in the tradition of Republicans such as Abraham Lincoln and Theodore Roosevelt, and that "it was conservative reforms like anti-trust laws and federal regulation of railroads ... that retained the allegiance of the people for a capitalist system combining private incentive and public conscience."

His rivalry with Taft notwithstanding, Dewey nevertheless went surreptitiously to the hospital in 1953 to visit with Taft when the latter was gravely ill. The two talked for half an hour, and afterward Taft joked that "Tom came around to see whether I am really out of the running."

== Later career ==
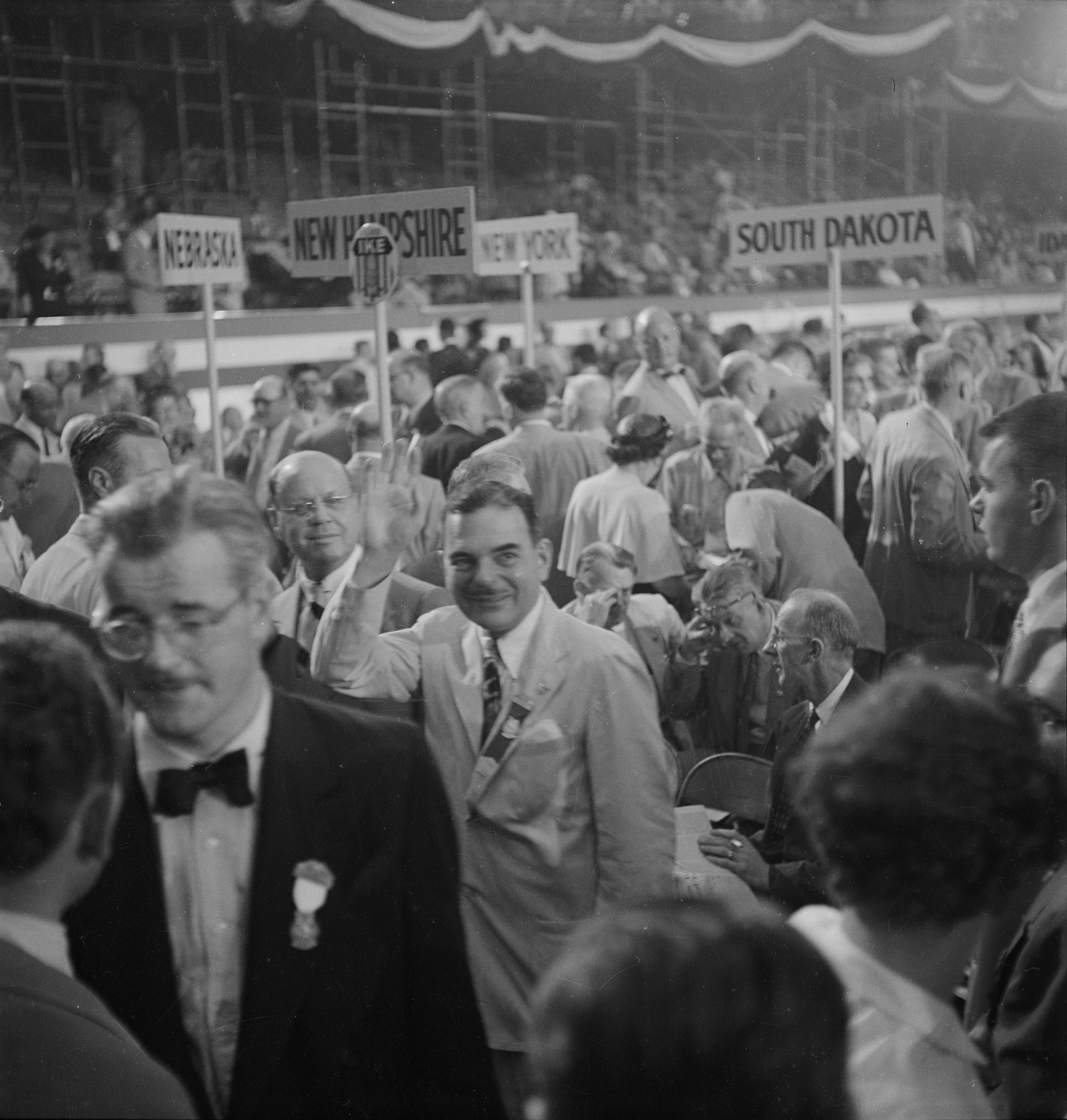
Dewey at the 1952 Republican National Convention

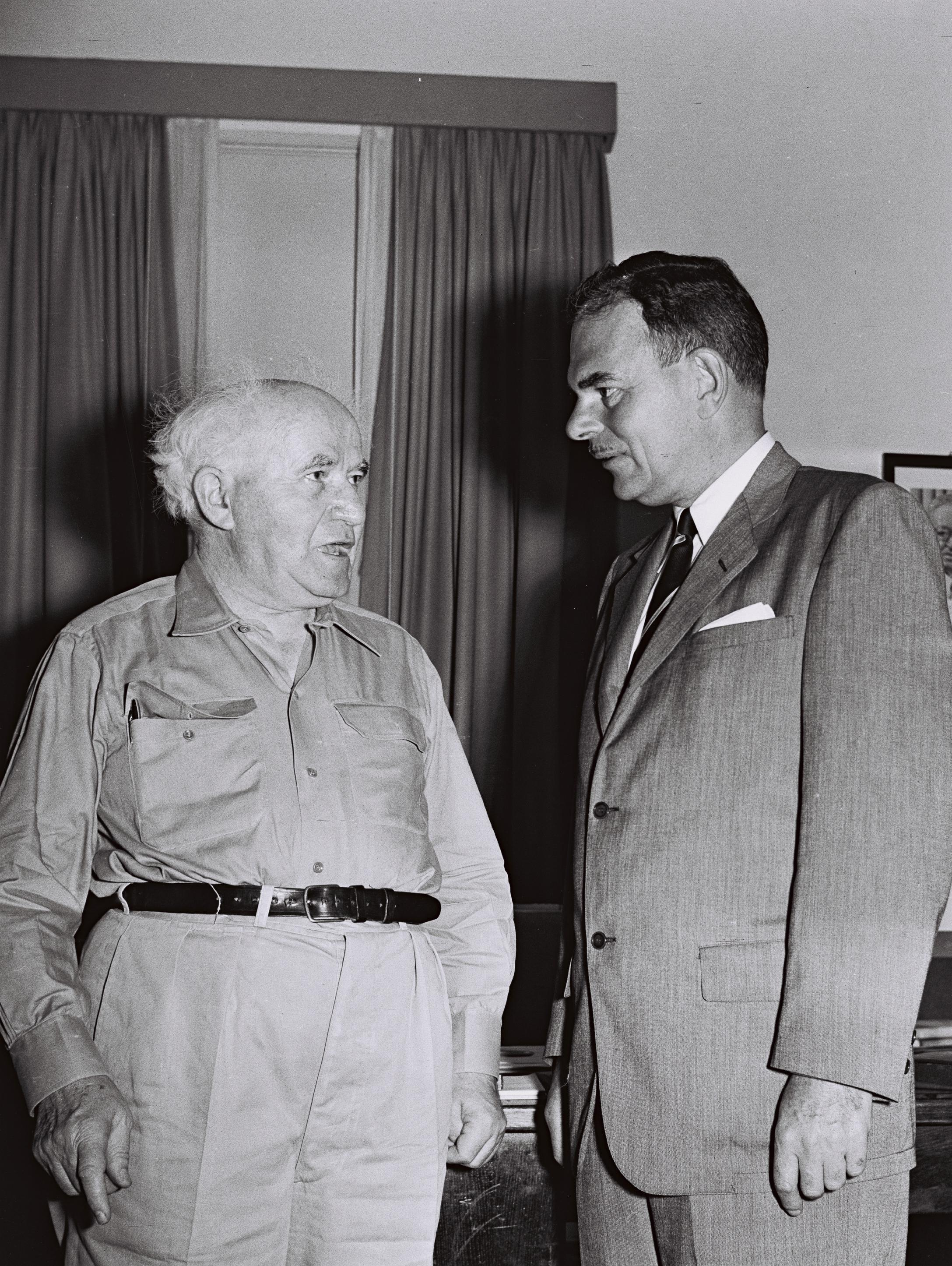
Dewey visiting David Ben-Gurion, October 1955

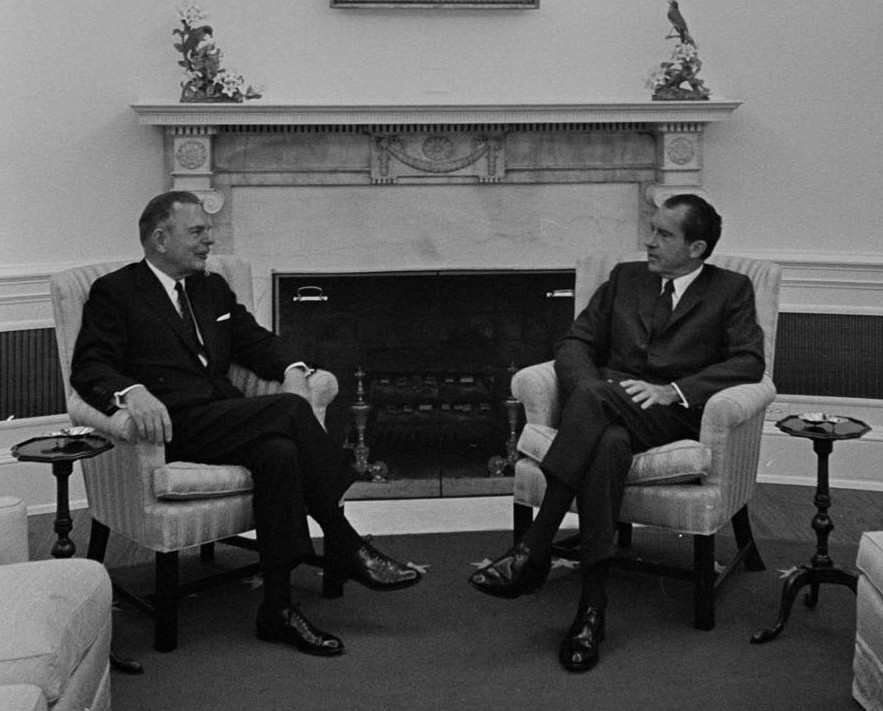
Dewey with President Richard Nixon in 1969

In May 1953, Governor Dewey set up a nine-member advisory board to help the State Safety Division's Bureau of Safety and Accident Prevention and appointed Edward Burton Hughes (the Deputy New York State Superintendent of Public Works) as chairman. The advisory board was formed to draft accident prevention policies and programs.

Dewey's third term as governor of New York expired at the end of 1954, after which he retired from public service and returned to his law practice, Dewey Ballantine, although he remained a power broker behind the scenes in the Republican Party. In 1956, when Eisenhower mulled not running for a second term, he suggested Dewey as his choice as successor, but party leaders made it plain that they would not entrust the nomination to Dewey yet again, and ultimately Eisenhower decided to run for re-election. Dewey also played a major role that year in convincing Eisenhower to keep Nixon as his running mate; Eisenhower had considered dropping Nixon from the Republican ticket and picking someone he felt would be less partisan and controversial. However, Dewey argued that dropping Nixon from the ticket would only anger Republican voters while winning Eisenhower few votes from the Democrats. Dewey's arguments helped convince Eisenhower to keep Nixon on the ticket. In 1960, Dewey would strongly support Nixon's ultimately unsuccessful presidential campaign against Democrat John F. Kennedy.

Although Dewey publicly supported Nelson Rockefeller in all four of his campaigns for Governor of New York, and backed Rockefeller in his losing 1964 bid for the Republican presidential nomination against Arizona Senator Barry Goldwater, he did privately express concern and disappointment with what he regarded as Rockefeller's "spendthrift" methods as governor, and once told him "I like you Nelson, but I don't think I can afford you." In 1968, when both Rockefeller and Nixon were competing for the Republican presidential nomination, Dewey was publicly neutral, but "privately, according to close friends, he favored Nixon."

By the 1960s, as the conservative wing assumed more and more power within the Republican Party, Dewey removed himself further and further from party matters. When the Republicans in 1964 gave the conservative Senator Goldwater their presidential nomination, Dewey declined to even attend the Republican Convention in San Francisco; it was the first Republican Convention he had missed since 1936. Still, however, he did publicly support Goldwater for president in the election.

Although closely identified with the Republican Party for virtually his entire adult life, Dewey was a close friend of Democratic Senator Hubert H. Humphrey, and Dewey aided Humphrey in being named as the Democratic nominee for vice-president in 1964, advising President Lyndon Johnson on ways to block efforts at the party convention by Kennedy loyalists to stampede Robert F. Kennedy onto the ticket as Johnson's running mate.

In the mid-1960s, President Johnson tried to convince Dewey to accept positions on several government commissions, especially a national crime commission, which Johnson wanted Dewey to chair. After Nixon won the presidency in 1968, there were rumors that Dewey would be offered a Cabinet position, or a seat on the U.S. Supreme Court. However, Dewey declined all offers to return to government service, preferring instead to concentrate on his highly profitable law firm. By the early 1960s, his share of the firm's profits had made him a millionaire, and his net worth at the time of his death was estimated at over $3 million (or over $24 million in 2025 dollars).

Dewey was offered the position of Chief Justice of the United States twice, first by Dwight D. Eisenhower in 1953 and again by Richard Nixon in 1969. He declined the offer both times. Two years after the 1948 campaign, Harry S. Truman offered Dewey the position of United States Ambassador to the United Kingdom. However, he declined the offer.

== Death ==
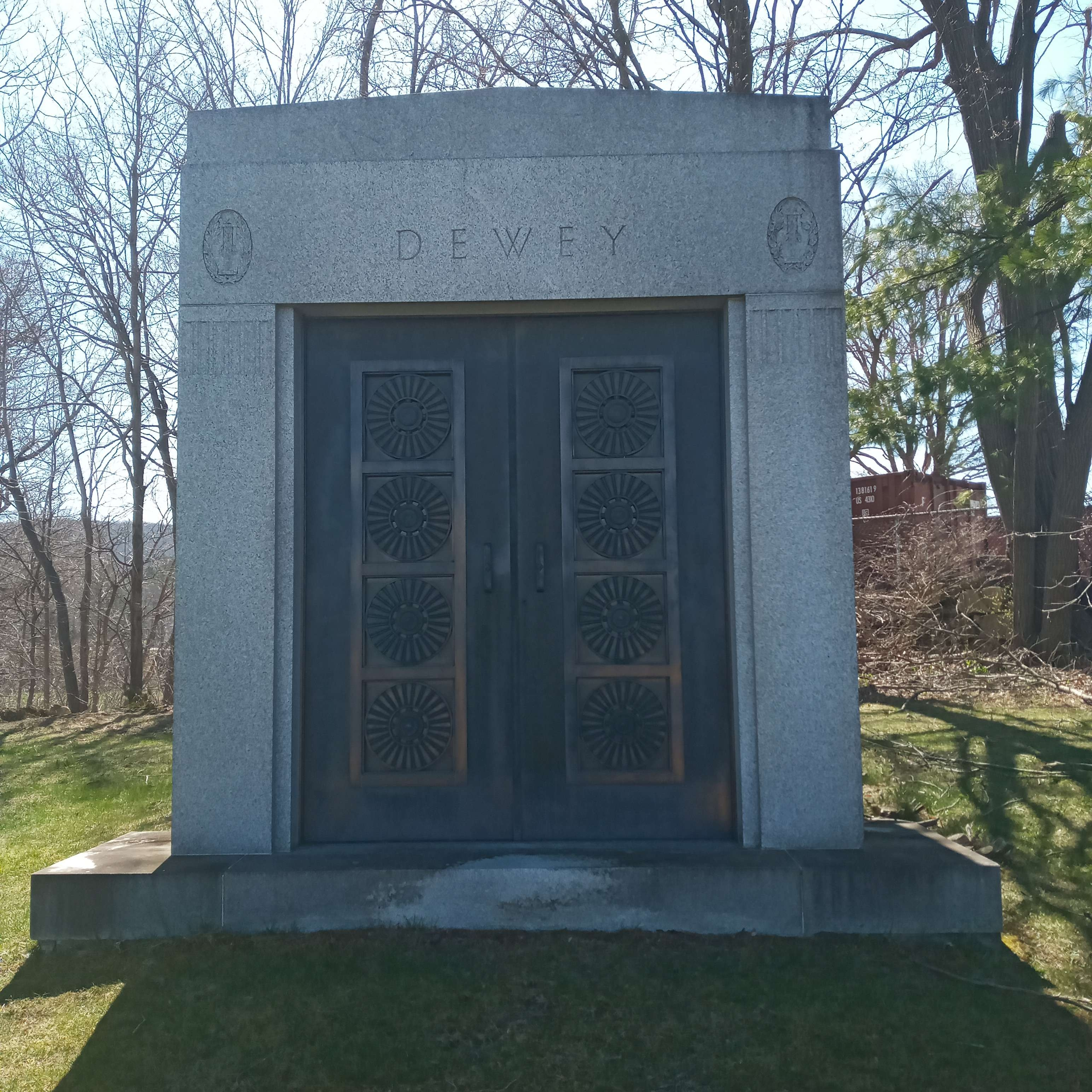
The Deweys' gravesite

Dewey's wife Frances died in July 1970, six years after being diagnosed with breast cancer. Later that year he began dating actress Kitty Carlisle, and there was talk of marriage.

On March 15, 1971, Dewey traveled to Miami, Florida, for a brief golfing vacation with his friend Dwayne Andreas, and others. The next day, following a round of golf with baseball star Carl Yastrzemski, Dewey failed to appear for his ride to Miami International Airport. He was found dead in his hotel room. An autopsy determined that he had died suddenly from a heart attack.

Following a public memorial service at Saint James' Episcopal Church in New York City, which was attended by President Nixon, former vice president Hubert Humphrey, New York governor Nelson Rockefeller, and other prominent politicians, Dewey was buried next to Frances in the town cemetery of Pawling, New York. After his death, his farm of Dapplemere was sold and renamed "Dewey Lane Farm" in his honor.

== Public image ==
Dewey received varied reactions from the public and fellow politicians, with praise for his good intentions, honesty, administrative talents, and inspiring speeches, but most of them also criticized his ambition and his perceived stiffness in public. One of his biographers wrote that he had "a personality that attracted contempt and adulation in equal proportion."

Dewey was a forceful and inspiring speaker, traveling the whole country during his presidential campaigns and attracting uncommonly huge crowds. His friend and neighbor Lowell Thomas believed that Dewey was "an authentic colossus" whose "appetite for excellence [tended] to frighten less obsessive types", and his 1948 running mate Earl Warren "professed little personal affection for Dewey, but [believed] him a born executive who would make a great president." The pollster George Gallup once described Dewey as "the ablest public figure of his lifetime ... the most misunderstood man in recent American history."

On the other hand, President Franklin D. Roosevelt privately called Dewey "the little man" and "a son of a bitch", and to Robert Taft and other conservative Republicans Dewey "became synonymous with ... New York newspapers, New York banks, New York arrogance – the very city Taft's America loves to hate." A Taft supporter once referred to Dewey as "that snooty little governor of New York".

Herbert Brownell, Dewey's campaign manager in his 1944 and 1948 presidential campaigns, later recalled that Dewey was "a tough man to herd ... He'd see a local political leader who wasn't doing a very good job and he'd tell him so. Well, he should have left that to his managers to do ... he could tell another person what to do brilliantly, but he wouldn't do it himself. He'd give me the perfect formula for handling a difficult person, but then he'd get annoyed at something the guy said." According to Brownell, "perfectionism had its price, and Dewey paid it ... He didn't really like handshaking, and he wasn't good at it ... he'd climbed up the [political] ladder the hard way. He worked harder, studied longer than anyone else. He could take a problem, break it down into component parts, assign it to talented people. He was a real fighter. As president he would have been boss, but the glad handing, small talk, personality side of politics, he just could not do." When asked if Dewey was happy in politics, Brownell replied: "I don't think he was ever happy. He got joy out of attainment. He was satisfied with many of his accomplishments. But as for happiness, in the usual sense of the word – he wasn't really geared to our political system."

=== Appearance and knowledge ===
Dewey grew his mustache when he was dating Frances, and because "she liked it, the mustache stayed, to the delight of cartoonists and dismay of political advisers for 20 years." During the 1944 election campaign, Dewey suffered an unexpected blow when Alice Roosevelt Longworth was reported as having mocked Dewey as "the little man on the wedding cake", (Note: Longworth did not originate the witticism. Democratic Party operatives Isabel Kinnear Griffin and Helen Essary Murphy began circulating the remark, attributing it to Longworth to help it spread (Cordery, p. 424).) alluding to his neat mustache and dapper dress. It was ridicule he could never shake.

Dewey alienated former Republican president Herbert Hoover, who confided to a friend "Dewey has no inner reservoir of knowledge on which to draw for his thinking," elaborating that "A man couldn't wear a mustache like that without having it affect his mind."

=== Aloofness ===
Dewey had a tendency towards pomposity and was considered stiff and unapproachable in public, with his aide Ruth McCormick Simms once describing him as "cold, cold as a February iceberg". She added that "he was brilliant and thoroughly honest."

During his governorship, one writer observed: "A blunt fact about Mr. Dewey should be faced: it is that many people do not like him. He is, unfortunately, one of the least seductive personalities in public life. That he has made an excellent record as governor is indisputable. Even so, people resent what they call his vindictiveness, the 'metallic' nature of his efficiency, his cockiness (which actually conceals a nature basically shy), and his suspiciousness. People say ... that he is as devoid of charm as a rivet or a lump of stone."

However, Dewey's friends considered him a warm and friendly companion. Journalist Irwin Ross noted that, "more than most politicians, [Dewey] displayed an enormous gap between his private and his public manner. To friends and colleagues he was warm and gracious, considerate of others' views ... He could tell a joke and was not dismayed by an off-color story. In public, however, he tended to freeze up, either out of diffidence or too stern a sense of the dignity of office. The smiles would seem forced ... the glad-handing gesture awkward."

A magazine writer described the difference between Dewey's private and public behavior by noting that, "Till he gets to the door, he may be cracking jokes and laughing like a schoolboy. But the moment he enters a room he ceases to be Tom Dewey and becomes what he thinks the Governor of New York ought to be."

Leo W. O'Brien, a reporter for United Press International (UPI) who was later elected to Congress as a Democrat, recalled Dewey in an interview by saying that "I hated his guts when he first came to Albany, and I loved him by the time he left. It was almost tragic how he put on a pose that alienated people. Behind a pretty thin veneer he was a wonderful guy." John Gunther wrote in 1947 that many supporters were fiercely loyal to Dewey.

=== Opportunism and vagueness ===
Dewey's presidential campaigns were hampered by his habit of not being "prematurely specific" on controversial issues. President Truman poked fun at Dewey's vague campaign by joking that G.O.P. actually stood for "grand old platitudes".

Dewey's frequent refusal to discuss specific issues and proposals in his campaigns was based partly on his belief in public opinion polls; one biographer claimed that he "had an almost religious belief in the revolutionary science of public-opinion sampling." He was the first presidential candidate to employ his own team of pollsters, and when a worried businessman told Dewey in the 1948 presidential campaign that he was losing ground to Truman and urged him to "talk specifics in his closing speeches", Dewey and his aide Paul Lockwood displayed polling data that showed Dewey still well ahead of Truman, and Dewey told the businessman "when you're leading, don't talk."

Walter Lippman regarded Dewey as an opportunist, who "changes his views from hour to hour ... always more concerned with taking the popular position than he is in dealing with the real issues."

The journalist John Gunther wrote: "There are plenty of vain and ambitious and uncharming politicians. This would not be enough to cause Dewey's lack of popularity. What counts more is that so many people think of him as opportunistic. Dewey seldom goes out on a limb by taking a personal position which may be unpopular ... every step is carefully calculated and prepared."

=== Relationship with legislators ===
As governor, Dewey had a reputation for ruthless treatment of New York legislators and political opponents.

[Dewey] cracked the whip ruthlessly on [Republican] legislators who strayed from the party fold. Assemblymen have found themselves under investigation by the State Tax Department after opposing the Governor over an insurance regulation bill. Others discover job-rich construction projects, state buildings, even highways, directed to friendlier [legislators ... He] forced the legislature his own party dominates to reform its comfortable ways of payroll padding. Now legislative workers must verify in writing every two weeks what they have been doing to earn their salary; every state senator and assemblyman must verify that [they] are telling the truth. All this has occasioned more than grumbling. Some Assemblymen have quit in protest. Others have been denied renomination by Dewey's formidable political organization. Reporters mutter among themselves about government by blackmail.

=== Honesty and integrity ===
Dewey received positive publicity for his reputation for honesty and integrity. The newspaper editor William Allen White praised Dewey as "an honest cop with the mind of an honest cop." An October 1953 editorial in the Oneonta Star said that "We think the Governor is ruthless in his actions, but we also think he will countenance nothing that smacks of trickery and dishonesty in public administration."

He insisted on having every candidate for a job paying $2,500 or more rigorously probed by state police. He was so concerned about the elected public official being motivated by the wealth his position could produce that he frequently said, "No man should be in public office who can't make more money in private life." Dewey accepted no anonymous campaign contributions and had every large contributor not known personally to him investigated "for motive." When he signed autographs, he would date them so that no one could imply a closer relationship than actually existed.

A journalist noted in 1947 that Dewey "has never made the slightest attempt to capitalize on his enormous fame, except politically. Even when temporarily out of office, in the middle 1930s, he rigorously resisted any temptation to be vulgarized or exploited ... he could easily have become a millionaire several times over by succumbing to various movie and radio offers. He would have had to do nothing except give permission for movies or radio serials to be built around his career and name. Be it said to his honor, he never did so."

== Legacy ==
In 1964, the New York State legislature officially renamed the New York State Thruway in honor of Dewey. Signs on Interstate 95 between the end of the Bruckner Expressway (in the Bronx) and the Connecticut state line, as well as on the Thruway mainline (Interstate 87 between the Bronx–Westchester line and Albany, and Interstate 90 between Albany and the New York–Pennsylvania line) designate the name as Governor Thomas E. Dewey Thruway, though this official designation is rarely used in reference to these roads.

Dewey's official papers from his years in politics and public life were given to the University of Rochester; they are housed in the university library and are available to historians and other writers.

In 2005, the New York City Bar Association named an award after Dewey. The Thomas E. Dewey Medal, formerly sponsored by the law firm of Dewey & LeBoeuf LLP, is awarded annually to one outstanding assistant district attorney in each of New York City's five counties (New York, Kings, Queens, Bronx, and Richmond). The medal was first awarded on November 29, 2005. The Thomas E. Dewey Medal is now sponsored by the law firm Dewey Pegno & Kramarsky LLP.

In May 2012, Dewey & LeBoeuf (the successor firm to Dewey Ballantine) filed for bankruptcy.

Disney writer Dana Coty named Donald Duck's nephew Dewey after Thomas E. Dewey.

== Publications ==
- The Case Against the New Deal (1940), Harper & Bros., New York
- Journey to the Far Pacific (1952), Doubleday & Company, Garden City, New York
- Twenty Against the Underworld (1974), Doubleday & Company, Garden City, New York

== Sources ==
- Cordery, Stacy A. (2007). Alice: Alice Roosevelt Longworth, From White House Princess to Washington Power Broker. Penguin Books. ISBN 978-0-14-311427-7.
- Divine, Robert A. "The Cold War and the Election of 1948", The Journal of American History, Vol. 59, No. 1 (Jun. 1972), pp. 90–110 in JSTOR
- Donaldson, Gary A. Truman Defeats Dewey (1999). University Press of Kentucky
- Gunther, John. Inside U.S.A. (1947). New York: Harper & Brothers.
- Peirce, Neal and Jerry Hagstrom. The Book of America: Inside Fifty States Today. New York: Warner Books, 1984.
- Peters, Charles. Five Days in Philadelphia Public Affairs Books, New York (2006)
- Pietrusza, David 1948: Harry Truman's Improbable Victory and the Year that Changed America, Union Square Press, 2011.
- Plotch, Philip Mark. Politics Across the Hudson: The Tappan Zee Bridge. Rutgers University Press, New Jersey (2015).
- Ross, Irwin. The Loneliest Campaign: The Truman Victory of 1948. The New American Library, New York (1968)
- Smith, Richard Norton. Thomas E. Dewey and His Times. Simon & Schuster, New York (1982), the standard scholarly biography.

Primary sources

- Thomas E. Dewey Papers, University of Rochester
- Dewey, Thomas Edmund. Public Papers of Thomas E. Dewey: Fifty-first Governor of the State of New York, 1943 [-1954]. (10 volumes. Williams Press, 1946.)

Legal offices
Preceded by George Z. Medalie	United States Attorney for the Southern District of New York; Acting; 1933	Succeeded by Martin Conboy
Preceded by William C. Dodge	District Attorney of New York County; 1938–1942	Succeeded by Frank Hogan
Party political offices
Preceded by William F. Bleakley	Republican nominee for Governor of New York; 1938, 1942, 1946, 1950	Succeeded by Irving Ives
Preceded by Wendell Willkie	Republican nominee for President of the United States; 1944, 1948	Succeeded by Dwight D. Eisenhower
Political offices
Preceded by Charles Poletti	Governor of New York; 1943–1954	Succeeded by W. Averell Harriman
