= Thomas E. Dewey Jr. =

American businessman (1932–2021)

- Born: Thomas Edmund Dewey Jr. October 2, 1932; New York City, New York, U.S.
- Died: December 6, 2021 (aged 89); New York City, New York, U.S.
- Education: The Albany Academy; Princeton University (BA); Harvard University (MBA)
- Occupations: Executive chairman, Dewey, Devlin, Metz & King; Partner Kuhn, Loeb & Co. Board member Scripps Research, Lenox Hill Hospital, NW Natural, Apple Bank; Vice Chairman of the New York City Housing Authority
- Spouse: Ann Lawler (m. 1959)
- Children: 3
- Parents: Thomas E. Dewey (father); Frances Hutt Dewey (mother)

Thomas Edmund Dewey Jr. (October 2, 1932 – December 6, 2021) was an American businessman in New York City. He was the elder son of Thomas E. Dewey, a former governor of New York and two-time Republican presidential nominee.

== Early life and education ==
Dewey was born in 1932 in New York City to Thomas E. Dewey and his wife Frances Hutt. He attended and was graduated from The Albany Academy while his father served as governor. He went on to earn a B.A. from Princeton University and a M.B.A. from Harvard Business School. He had one sibling, John Dewey.

== Career ==
He was a member of Dewey, Devlin, Metz & King LLC, which he helped to co-found in 1994. Prior to that, he was a member of McFarland Dewey & Co., a New York City investment banking firm specializing in advisory and agency services for corporate and government clients. He joined the investment banking firm of Kuhn, Loeb & Co. after graduation in 1958 and was a member of the firm's executive committee when he retired to form his own firm in 1975. From then until 1989, he was president of Thomas E. Dewey Jr. & Co., Inc., a financial advisory services firm.

Dewey was also on the board of trustees of Scripps Research Institute. Dewey served Lenox Hill Hospital as an active trustee beginning in 1959 and chairman emeritus from 1993 until his death. He also served as Vice Chairman of the New York City Housing Development Corporation from 1972 to 1989. He served in the United States Army.

== Personal life ==
In 1959, Dewey married the former Ann Reynolds Lawler at Sleepy Hollow Country Club and the couple resided on 79th Street on New York's Upper East Side. They had three children: Thomas Edmund Lawler Dewey, a litigator with Dewey, Pegno & Kramarsky LLP, Elizabeth Dewey Grattan, a television and content producer on shows such as Full Frontal Fashion, and George Dewey, a movie producer and marketing executive who is co-founder of Ryan Reynolds's Maximum Effort.

== Death ==
Dewey died on December 6, 2021, in New York City at age 89.
