= Dewey Marsh, Wisconsin =

State Wildlife Area in Portage County, Wisconsin

Dewey Marsh Wildlife Area
- Dewey Marsh
- IUCN category V (protected landscape/seascape)
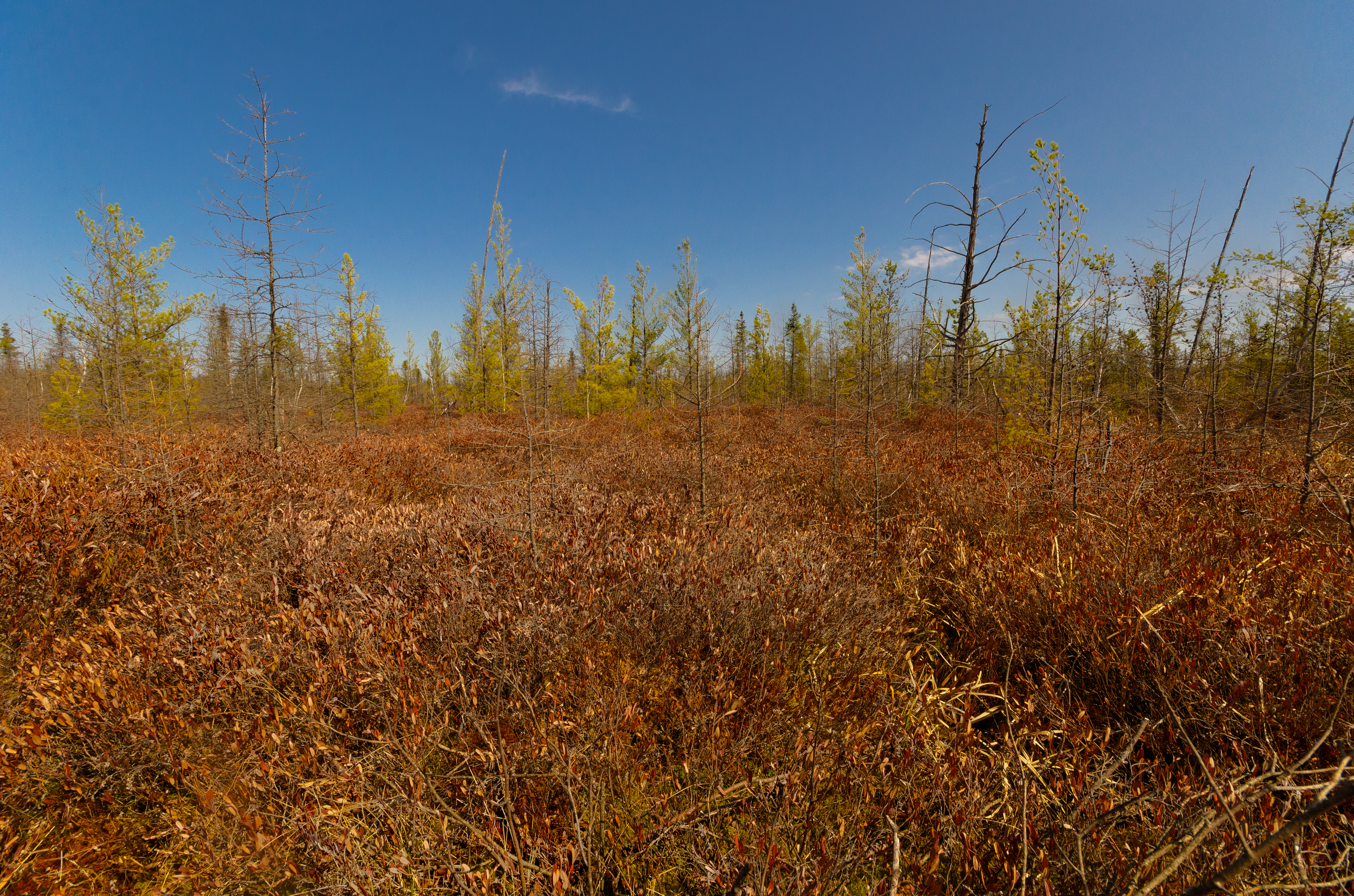
- Dewey Marsh, April 2015

- Location within Wisconsin Location within the United States
- Location: Portage, Wisconsin
- Nearest city: Stevens Point, WI
- Coordinates: 44°38′33.6″N 89°33′40.6″W
- Area: 6,078 acres (24.60 km^{2})
- Established: 1973
- Governing body: Wisconsin Department of Natural Resources

The Dewey Marsh is a state wildlife area in Portage County, Wisconsin, United States.

== Geography ==
The Dewey Marsh is located in central Wisconsin approximately five to ten miles north of Stevens Point (Lat: 44° 38' 33.6", Lon: -89° 33' 40.6") in the center of the town of Dewey.

== History ==
The Dewey Marsh began its early days as a hunting and fishing trading post with the local Native Americans. The Dewey Marsh was later purchased by the Wisconsin Department of Natural Resources to preserve its wetland heritage. The Dewey Marsh suffered a great fire in 1974, which burned in the bogs until 1976.

Today, the Dewey Marsh is noted for its public lands and the County's Dewey's Shooting Range.
