= Dewey, Skagit County, Washington =

Unincorporated community in Washington, US

Dewey, Washington
- Unincorporated community
- Location within Washington (state)
- Coordinates: 48°25′30″N 122°36′31″W
- Country: United States
- State: Washington
- County: Skagit
- Elevation: 46 ft (14 m)
- Time zone: UTC-8 (Pacific (PST))
  - Summer (DST): UTC-7 (PDT)
- Area code(s): 360, 564
- GNIS feature ID: 1512147

Dewey (also Gibraltar) is an unincorporated community in Skagit County, Washington, United States.

== History ==
The community was originally called Deception, then Fidalgo City and renamed in 1898 after George Dewey, a naval officer in the Spanish–American War. An interurban railway was completed between Anacortes and Fidalgo City in 1891 with the sole purpose of securing land grants, as it ran with a minimum number of trips before ceasing operations.
