= Electoral history of Nelson Rockefeller =

Elections featuring US Vice President

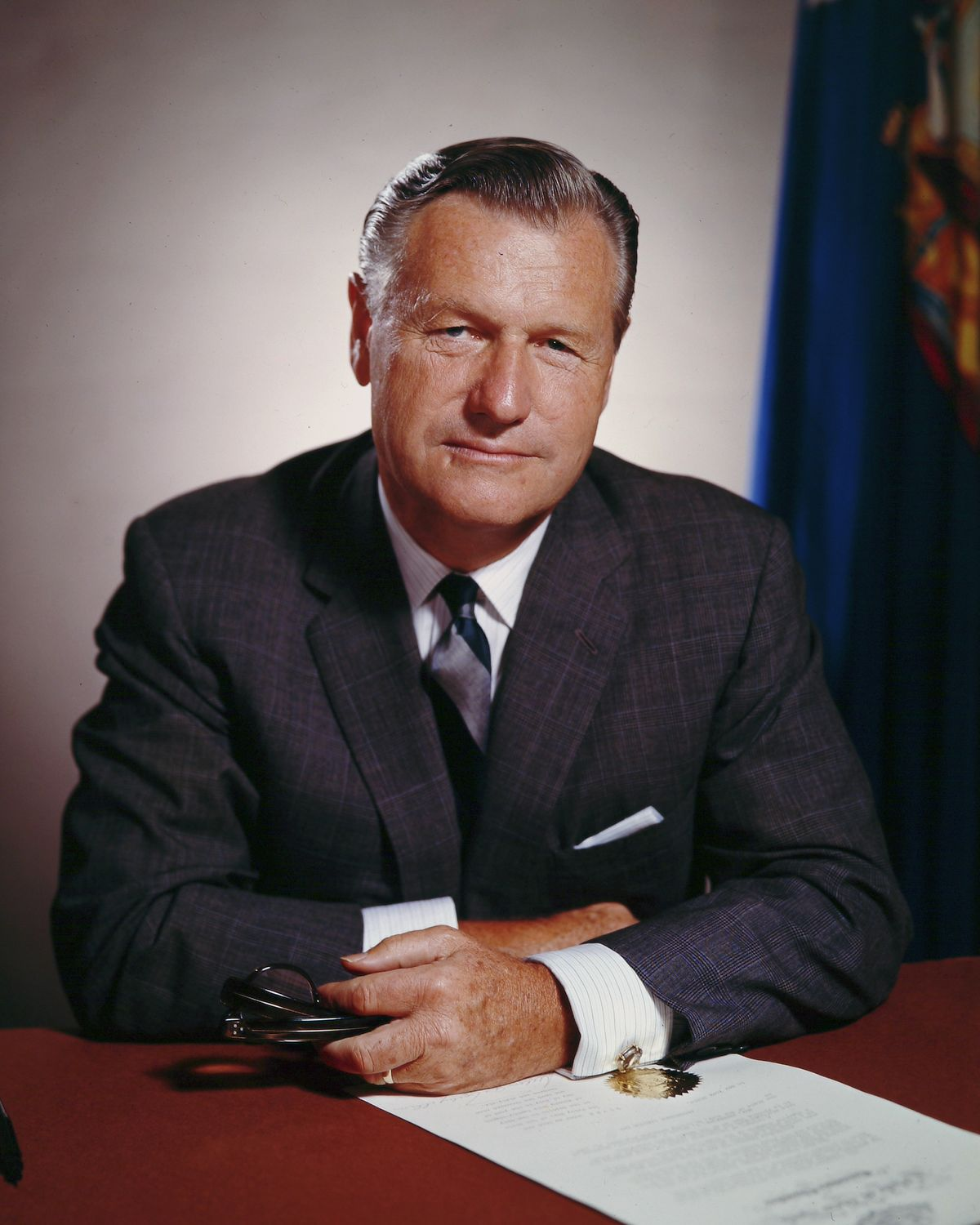
Rockefeller in 1965

Electoral history of Nelson Rockefeller, who served as the 41st vice president of the United States (1974–1977), the 49th governor of New York (1959–1973), and was a three-time candidate for the Republican Party presidential nomination (1960; 1964; 1968).

== Gubernatorial elections ==
Governor of New York, 1958
Party	Candidate	Votes	%
Republican	Nelson Rockefeller/Malcolm Wilson	3,126,929	54.7%
Democratic	W. Averell Harriman/George B. DeLuca	2,269,969	
Liberal	W. Averell Harriman/George B. DeLuca	283,926	
Total	W. Averell Harriman/George B. DeLuca	2,553,895	44.7%
Ind. Socialist	John T. McManus/Annette Rubinstein	31,658	0.6%

Governor of New York, 1962
Party	Candidate	Votes	%
Republican	Nelson Rockefeller/Malcolm Wilson (inc.)	3,081,587	53.1%
Democratic	Robert M. Morgenthau/John J. Burns	2,309,743	
Liberal	Robert M. Morgenthau/John J. Burns	242,675	
Total	Robert M. Morgenthau/John J. Burns	2,552,418	44%
Conservative	David H. Jaquith/E. Vernon Carbonara	141,877	2.4%
Socialist Workers	Richard Garza/Sylvia Weinstein	19,698	0.3%
Socialist Labor	Eric Hass/John Emanuel	9,762	0.2%

=== 1966 ===
1966 New York gubernatorial election
Governor candidate	Running Mate	Party	Popular Vote	
Nelson A. Rockefeller	Malcolm Wilson	Republican	2,690,626	(44.61%)
Frank D. O'Connor	Howard J. Samuels	Democratic	2,298,363	(38.11%)
Paul L. Adams	Kieran O'Doherty	Conservative	513,023	(8.46%)
Franklin D. Roosevelt, Jr.	Donald S. Harrington	Liberal	507,234	(8.41%)
Milton Herder	Doris Ballantyne	Socialist Labor	12,730	(0.21%)
Judith White	Richard Garza	Socialist Workers	12,506	(0.21%)

=== 1970 ===
1970 New York gubernatorial election
Governor candidate	Running Mate	Party	Popular Vote	
Nelson A. Rockefeller	Malcolm Wilson	Republican	3,151,432	(52.41%)
Arthur Goldberg	Basil Paterson	Democratic, Liberal	2,421,426	(40.27%)
Paul L. Adams	Edward F. Leonard	Conservative	422,514	(7.03%)
Rasheed Storey	Grace Mora-Newman	Communist	7,760	(0.13%)
Clifton DeBerry	Jonathan Rothschild	Socialist Workers	5,766	(0.10%)
Stephen Emery	Arnold Babel	Socialist Labor	3,963	(0.07%)

== Presidential nomination elections ==
=== 1960 ===
1960 Republican Party presidential primaries:
Party	Candidate	Aggregate votes	%
Republican	Richard Nixon	4,975,938	86.63
Republican	Unpledged	314,234	5.47
Republican	George H. Bender	211,090	3.68
Republican	James M. Lloyd	48,461	0.84
Republican	Nelson Rockefeller	30,639	0.53
Republican	Frank R. Beckwith	19,677	0.34

=== 1964 ===
1964 Republican Party presidential primaries:
Party	Candidate	Aggregate votes	%
Republican	Barry Goldwater	2,267,079	38.33
Republican	Nelson Rockefeller	1,304,204	22.05
Republican	James A. Rhodes	615,754	10.41
Republican	Henry Cabot Lodge Jr.	386,661	6.54
Republican	John W. Byrnes	299,612	5.07
Republican	William Scranton	245,401	4.15
Republican	Margaret Chase Smith	227,007	3.84
Republican	Richard Nixon	197,212	3.33
Republican	Unpledged	173,652	2.94
Republican	Harold Stassen	114,083	1.93

1964 Republican presidential nomination
Party	Candidate	Votes	%
Republican	Barry Goldwater	883	67.51
Republican	William Scranton	214	16.36
Republican	Nelson Rockefeller	114	8.72
Republican	George Romney	41	3.14
Republican	Margaret Chase Smith	27	2.06
Republican	Walter H. Judd	22	1.68
Republican	Hiram Fong	5	0.38
Republican	Henry Cabot Lodge Jr.	2	0.15
First ballot Vote totals following vote shifts: Goldwater – 1,220; Scranton – 50; Smith – 22; Rockefeller – 6; Others – 10

=== 1968 ===
1968 Republican Party presidential primaries:
Party	Candidate	Aggregate votes	%
Republican	Ronald Reagan	1,696,632	37.93
Republican	Richard Nixon	1,679,443	37.54
Republican	James A. Rhodes	614,492	13.74
Republican	Nelson Rockefeller	164,340	3.67
Republican	Unpledged	140,639	3.14
Republican	Eugene McCarthy	44,520	1.00
Republican	Harold Stassen	31,655	0.71
Republican	Richard Nixon	31,465	0.70

1968 Republican presidential nomination
Party	Candidate	Votes	%
Republican	Richard Nixon	692	51.92
Republican	Nelson Rockefeller	277	20.78
Republican	Ronald Reagan	182	13.66
Republican	James A. Rhodes	55	4.13
Republican	George Romney	50	3.75
Republican	Clifford Case	22	1.65
Republican	Frank Carlson	20	1.50
Republican	Winthrop Rockefeller	18	1.35
Republican	Hiram Fong	14	1.05
Republican	Harold Stassen	2	0.14
Republican	John V. Lindsay	1	0.07
First ballot Vote totals following vote shifts: Nixon – 1,238; Rockefeller – 93; Reagan – 2

== 1974 vice presidential confirmation ==
1974 U.S. Senate Vice presidential confirmation
December 10, 1974	Party				Total votes
December 10, 1974	Democratic	Republican	Conservative	Independent	Total votes
Yes	52	36	1	1	90
No	4	3	0	0	7

1974 U.S. House Vice presidential confirmation
December 19, 1974	Party		Total votes
December 19, 1974	Democratic	Republican	Total votes
Yes	134	153	287
No	98	30	128
