= Ponchitta Pierce =

Television host and producer

Ponchitta Pierce (born August 5, 1942) is a television host and producer, journalist, speech writer and communications expert. Pierce began her journalism career at Ebony magazine, before becoming the New York editor and eventually the New York Bureau Chief of Johnson Publications, Ebony’s parent company.

== Early life and education ==
Pierce was born as Ponchitta Marie Anne Vincent Pierce in Chicago, Illinois on August 5, 1942. Her parents, Alfred Leonard Pierce and Nora Vincent Pierce were both from New Orleans, Louisiana. In eighth grade, Pierce moved to Los Angeles, CA where she attended Bishop Conaty High School. Pierce is a graduate of the University of Southern California with a B.A. (cum laude) in journalism, she also studied at Cambridge University in England. During her time at USC, Pierce wrote for the student newspaper and edited the yearbook.

== Career ==
Pierce became an assistant editor of Ebony and Jet magazines in 1964. By 1965 she had become associate editor. A 1966 piece she wrote for a special issue of Ebony on the "Negro Woman" is remembered by America's Black Holocaust Museum quoting her line "The Negro woman intellectual is easily one of the most misunderstood, underappreciated and problem-ridden of all God’s creatures".

Her broadcast news debut was in 1967. In 1973, she began as a special correspondent at CBS News and hosted programs for New York's PBS station WNET. Pierce additionally worked at WNBC-TV in New York where she hosted and co-produced the daily television show Today in New York from 1982 to 1987.

In 1979 she made the report of the death of former Vice President Nelson Rockefeller, who had suffered a heart attack while at the house of an aide, Megan Marshack. Marshack phoned Pierce, who was her friend, who then phoned an ambulance approximately an hour after the heart attack. During that interval Marshack had attempted to dress him as it is believed he died in her arms.

Pierce has been a contributing editor for Parade and McCall's magazines, and a roving editor for Reader's Digest. She has written numerous articles for a variety of national publications including AARP: The Magazine (Modern Maturity); Family Circle, More, Newsday, and Ladies Home Journal.

== Publications ==
- My Soul Looks Back in Wonder: Voices of the Civil Rights Experience (interviews appear, 2004) 978-1402714153
- The Leader of the Future 2: Visions, Strategies and Practices for the New Era (2017) 0787986674
- Keep Going No Mater What: The Reginald F. Lewis Legacy: 20 Years Later (2012) 0988631814
- Sona: The Story of a Dog Who Taught Me About Love (2021) 1956452028

== Personal life ==
Pierce is a member of several associations. She serves as a member of the board of directors of the Foreign Policy Association; WNET; The Inner-City Scholarship Fund of the Catholic Archdiocese of New York; Housing Enterprise for the Less Privileges (Help USA); and the Cuban Artists Fund. She is also a member of the Council on Foreign Relations, the Economic Club of New York; the Columbia-Presbyterian Health Science Advisory Council; and the advisory board for the Center on Public Diplomacy at the University of Southern California in Los Angeles.
