= Marshack =

Marshack is a surname. Notable people with the surname include:

- Alexander Marshack (1918–2004), American archaeologist
- Megan Marshack (1953–2024), American journalist
