= 810 Fifth Avenue =

Housing cooperative in Manhattan, New York

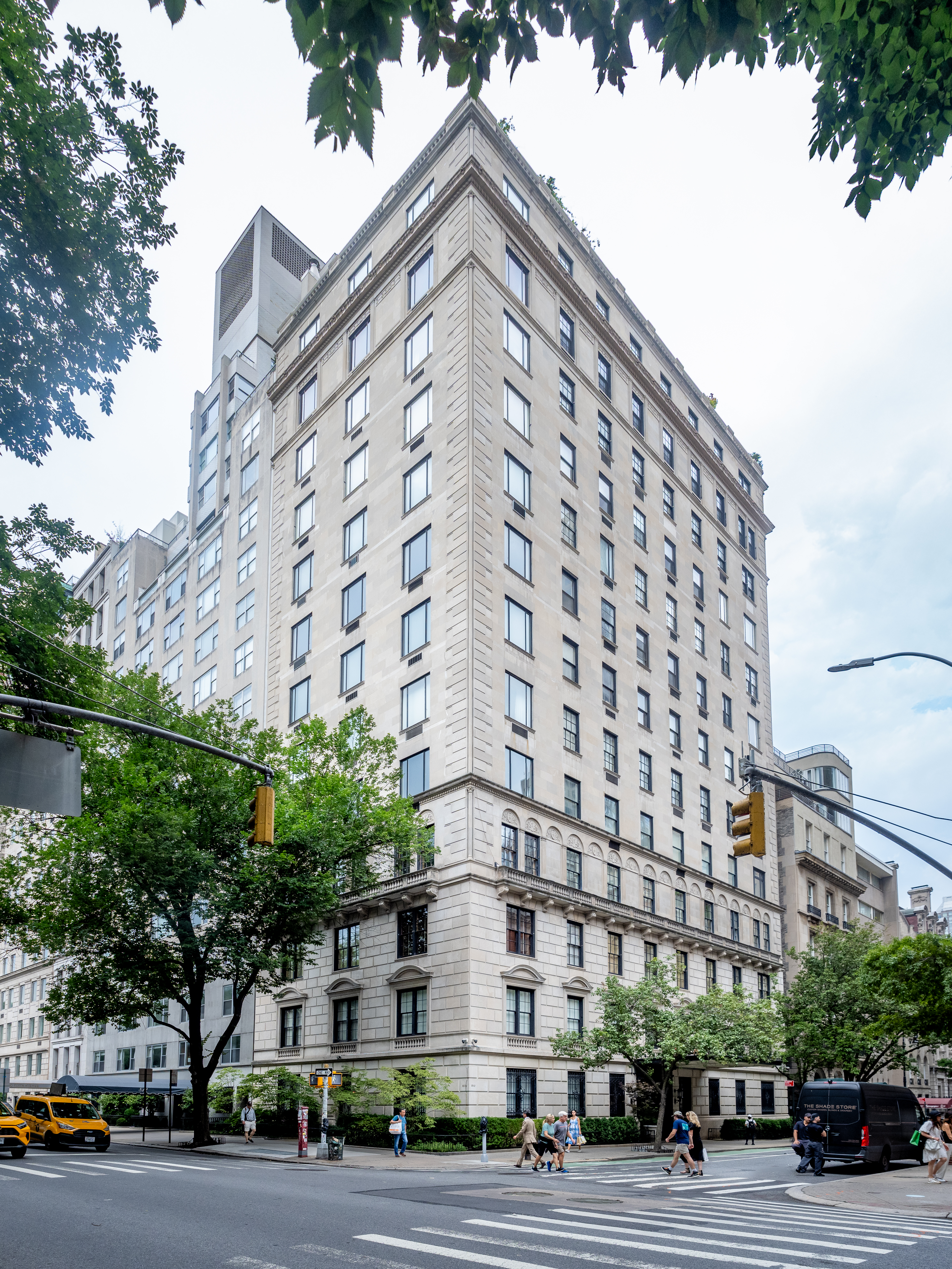
- Interactive map of the 810 Fifth Avenue area

General information
- Type: Housing cooperative
- Architectural style: Italian Renaissance
- Location: 810 Fifth Avenue, Upper East Side, Manhattan, New York City, U.S.
- Coordinates: 40°45′58″N 73°58′16.5″W
- Completed: 1926

Technical details
- Floor count: 13

Design and construction
- Architect: James Edwin Ruthven Carpenter, Jr.
- Main contractor: Bricken Construction Company

810 Fifth Avenue is a luxury residential housing cooperative on the Upper East Side of Manhattan, New York City.

== Overview ==
The building is on the northeast corner of East 62nd Street, across the street from the Knickerbocker Club. Designed by J. E. R. Carpenter for the Bricken Construction Company, it was built in 1926 on the site of a house owned by Mrs. Hamilton Fish. It is a 13-story, limestone-clad building in Italian Renaissance-palazzo style. It is one of the most expensive addresses in the city.

The building contains only 12 apartments: a ground floor maisonette, 10 full-floor apartments, and a multi-floor penthouse. Each full-floor apartment has 5,000 square feet (460 m^{2}) of space, four bedrooms and four servants' rooms. The elevator opens into a private entrance foyer on each floor. Every apartment has windows overlooking Central Park. The detailing of the exterior in "elegant... limestone-clad, Italian Renaissance-palazzo style" is carried into the lobby, which features bronze torchieres and an elaborate carved plasterwork ceiling. The New York Times once speculated that 810 might be the only apartment building in the city to have "more employees than apartments."

== Notable residents ==
Nelson Rockefeller lived in a triplex apartment with his first wife Mary Todhunter Clark. The 30-room apartment was renovated for the Rockefellers by Wallace Harrison and decorated by Jean-Michel Frank. With his first wife, Rockefeller lived at the three top floors at 810 Fifth Avenue. After his divorce and marriage to Happy, his ex-wife kept the two top floors of the triplex apartment, while Nelson and Happy kept the 12th-floor apartment. The apartment was expanded by purchasing a floor of 812 Fifth Avenue, with the two spaces connected via a flight of six steps. Rockefeller and his second wife used the entrance at 812 Fifth while his first wife entered through 810 Fifth.

810 Fifth Avenue was the location of the infamous Treaty of Fifth Avenue in which Nixon and Rockefeller agreed on a policy agenda in advance of the 1960 elections, ultimately leading to a revolt among conservative Republicans. Senator Barry Goldwater denounced the meeting as "the Munich of the Republican Party".

Coincidentally, in 1963, former Vice President Richard Nixon bought an apartment in the building. During the 1968 presidential contest, Nixon and Rockefeller used different elevators. Nixon held meetings in his fifth-floor apartment during the campaign, including an early meeting with the man who would become his vice president, Spiro Agnew.

In 2000, the building's board of directors turned down an application by Gary Winnick to buy the former Nelson Rockefeller apartment. Notable residents have included Felix Rohatyn and former Archer Daniels Midland CEO Dwayne Andreas. David Geffen moved into 810 in 2006 but moved to 785 Fifth Avenue in 2010. Hedge fund manager William von Mueffling has also been a recent resident.
