= James M. Lloyd =

American politician

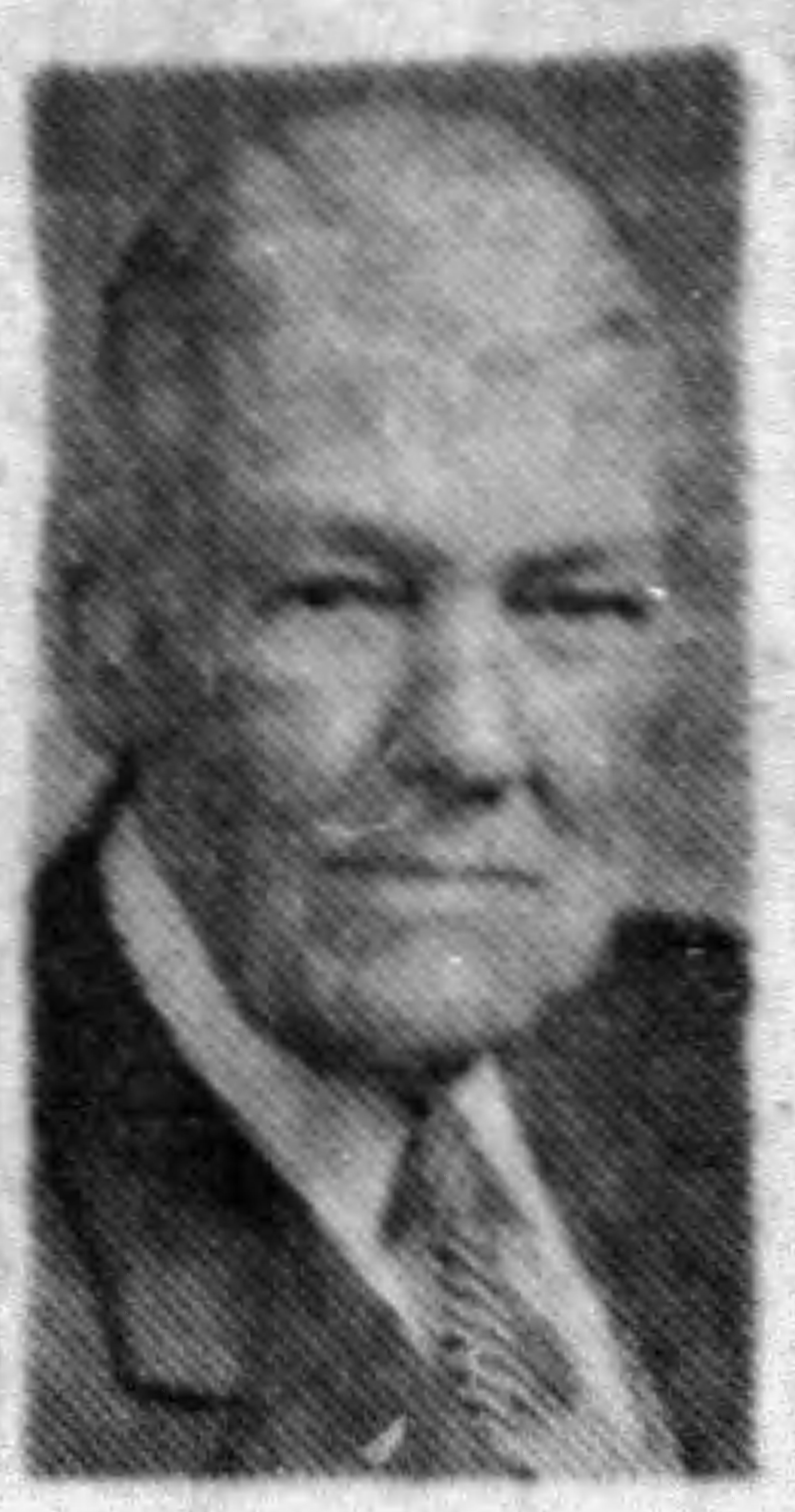

Member of the South Dakota Senate
- In office 1959–1963

Personal details
- Born: January 4, 1886 Yankton, South Dakota, U.S.
- Died: March 10, 1969 (aged 83)
- Party: Republican

James M. Lloyd (January 4, 1886 – March 10, 1969) was an American politician from South Dakota who served as a delegate to multiple Republican national conventions.

== Life ==
He served as a delegate to the 1940 and 1944 Republican National Conventions. From 1959 to 1963 he served as a state Senator and in 1960 he was appointed by Governor Ralph Herseth as a member of the Dakota Centennial Commission.

He is best known for winning, without any opposition, the 1960 South Dakota presidential primary and did not run in any other state. Lloyd, alongside that year's Republican nominee, Vice President Richard Nixon, and Governor of West Virginia Cecil H. Underwood (who also ran only in his home state), were the only candidates to win primaries in 1960.

In March 1969, he died in hospital in Yankton, South Dakota at the age of 83. He had suffered a stroke two weeks earlier.

== Electoral history ==
1960 South Dakota Republican presidential primary:

- James M. Lloyd - 48,461 (100.00%)

1960 Republican Party presidential primaries:

- Richard Nixon - 4,975,938 (86.63%)
- Unpledged delegates - 314,234 (5.47%)
- George H. Bender - 211,090 (3.68%)
- Cecil H. Underwood - 123,756 (2.16%)
- James M. Lloyd - 48,461 (0.84%)
- Nelson Rockefeller - 30,639 (0.53%)
- Frank R. Beckwith - 30,639 (0.53%)
