= William von Mueffling =

American film producer

- Born: Munich, Germany
- Education: Columbia University (BA, MBA)
- Occupation: Hedge Fund Manager
- Known for: founding Cantillon Capital Management
- Spouse: Clémence von Mueffling

William Alexander von Mueffling is an investor, hedge fund manager, and producer. He is the president of Cantillon Capital Management, an investment firm with more than $14 billion under management.

== Early life and education ==
Mueffling was born in Munich to a German investment-banker father, William Freiherr von Mueffling, and an American mother, Marsha Millard, who met as students at Columbia University. His paternal family is descended from German nobility, and his maternal grandfather, Mark Millard, was a senior managing director and a member of the board of directors of Shearson/American Express. His father died when he was a toddler, and his mother moved William and his siblings to New York. He attended The Hotchkiss School in Lakeville, Connecticut. He then attended Columbia University, earning his B.A. in 1990 and M.B.A. from Columbia Business School in 1995.

== Career ==
Von Mueffling worked for Deutsche Bank in France before joining Lazard, where he became a managing director at Lazard Asset Management and gained fame as an investor in his early 30s by shorting technology stocks, posting average annual returns of more than 30% from 1998 to 2003. He was called a "Wunderkind" by Forbes and "alpha male" by the Economist for his stellar performance.

After a dispute with Lazard's chief executive Bruce Wasserstein over compensation, he left in 2003 to start his own hedge fund, Cantillon Capital Management. As a result of his departure, Lazard's hedge fund business suffered a devastating loss of $3 billion, as many of its investors followed von Mueffling to the new firm.

In 2007, he was named one of New York magazine's "hedge-fund elite" along with the likes of Chase Coleman, Peter Thiel and Eric Mindich. Between 2006 and 2008, he was named one of Institutional investor's 25 top-earning hedge fund managers in the industry.

Mueffling closed his hedge fund in 2009 and returned $3.5 billion to investors, and switched to a long-only strategy by retaining $1 billion in long-only assets. His investment firm has an AUM of nearly $15 billion, as of September 2021.

He executive produced the 2015 documentary film Racing Extinction about the ongoing Holocene extinction and the 2019 documentary film Slay the Dragon about gerrymandering in the United States. He also helped launch whosontheballot.org, a website that provides one-stop comprehensive guide for all things related to voting in New York City.

Mueffling sits on Columbia Business School's board of overseers. In 2007, he served on The President's Working Group on Financial Markets, where he was named to the Asset Manager's committee and helped draw up guidelines for best practices in the hedge fund industry.

Mueffling serves as an advisor to the litigation funding startup Legalist.

== Personal life and family ==
Von Mueffling is married to Clémence von Mueffling, an author and beauty expert whose mother, Lorraine Bolloré, and grandmother, Régine Debrise, were both beauty editors of Vogue Paris. She is a relative of French businessman Vincent Bolloré, CEO of the eponymous conglomerate Bolloré SE. He maintains a residence at 810 Fifth Avenue.
