= Commission on Critical Choices for Americans =

United States government working group

The Commission on Critical Choices for Americans was a bipartisan working group proposed by President Richard Nixon and established at his behest in 1973 by New York governor Nelson Rockefeller. Its purpose was to examine the impact of rapid change upon American society and the place of the United States on the world stage. Rockefeller resigned the governorship of New York in order to devote himself full-time to the CCCA in December, 1973.

Several high-profile people were appointed to the CCCA. Besides Governor Rockefeller, it included Vice President Gerald Ford, Secretary of State Henry Kissinger, Secretary of the Treasury George Shultz, the majority and minority leaders of both the US Senate and the US House of Representatives, numerous high-profile businessmen and educators, as well as Daniel Patrick Moynihan and former Miss America Bess Myerson.

The original name proposed for the commission was "America in the Third Century", a reference to the fact that, in 1976, the United States would begin its third century as an independent nation. However, Rockefeller ultimately decided that "Critical Choices for Americans" was a more descriptive moniker. The commissions work was set up in six areas:

- Panel I—Energy and Its Relationship to Ecology: Economics and World Stability.
- Panel II—Food, Health, World Population and Quality of Life.
- Panel III—Raw Materials, Industrial Development, Capital Formation, Employment and World Trade.
- Panel IV—International Trade and Monetary Systems, Inflation and the Relationships Among Differing Economics Systems.
- Panel V—Change, National Security and Peace, and
- Panel VI—Quality of Life of Individuals and Communities in the U.S.A

The commission was expected to take two years to complete its work, and indeed, its final report was issued in 1976.
