= Joseph E. Persico =

American author and military historian

Joseph Edward Persico (July 19, 1930 – August 30, 2014) was an author and American military historian. From 1974 to 1977, he was primary speechwriter to Vice President Nelson Rockefeller. At the time of his death, he lived in Guilderland, New York. His book Nuremberg: Infamy on Trial tells the story of the Nuremberg Trials; it was adapted for television as the docudrama Nuremberg.

== Early life ==
Joseph Edward Persico was born in Gloversville, New York, on July 19, 1930, to Thomas Persico and Bianca Perrone. In 1952 he received a Bachelor of Arts degree in English and Political Science from the New York State College for Teachers (now the University at Albany). Following graduation, he joined the U.S. Navy where he served as a Lieutenant (junior grade) aboard a minesweeper and also worked at NATO Headquarters Naples, Italy.

== Political career ==
After three years, he left the Navy and joined Governor W. Averell Harriman as a writer and researcher. In 1960, Persico joined the United States Information Agency working in Argentina, Brazil, and Washington as a Foreign Service Officer.

From 1963 until 1966, he served as Executive Assistant to the New York State Health Commissioner and in 1966 became the chief speechwriter for then Governor of New York Nelson A. Rockefeller. He remained Rockefeller's primary speechwriter throughout the latter's vice presidency.

Persico was nominated as a commissioner to the American Battle Monuments Commission by then Secretary of State Colin Powell. In this capacity he contributed to the design of the World War II Memorial located at the National Mall in Washington, D.C., writing the words of the poem carved into the message stone located at the eastern entrance of the memorial as well as appearing on the 'Freedom Wall' on the Western edge of the memorial.

== Author ==
External videos
- Booknotes interview with Persico on Roosevelt's Secret War, November 11, 2001, C-SPAN
- Presentation by Persico on Roosevelt's Secret War, February 12, 2002, C-SPAN
- Presentation by Persico on 11th Month, 11th Day, 11th Hour, November 11, 2004, C-SPAN
- Presentation by Persico on Franklin & Lucy, June 21, 2008, C-SPAN
- Presentation by Persico on Roosevelt's Centurions, June 23, 2012, C-SPAN
- Presentation by Persico on Roosevelt's Centurions, July 27, 2013, C-SPAN

In 1977, following the end of Rockefeller's tenure, Persico published My Enemy My Brother: Men and Days of Gettysburg, an historical work of non fiction covering the American Civil War.

In 1979, he published a novel, The Spiderweb, and a further nonfiction study, Piercing the Reich: The Penetration of Nazi Germany by American Secret Agents During World War II.

Three years later he produced The Imperial Rockefeller, a biography of his former employer. This was followed by a biography of Edward R. Murrow. In 1995, he co-wrote Colin L. Powell's autobiography My American Journey.

Throughout the 1990s, Persico continued to produce historical books (Casey: From the OSS to the CIA and Nuremberg: Infamy on Trial) as well as numerous articles on American history.

In November 2001, he published Roosevelt's Secret War: FDR and World War II Espionage and in 2004, Eleventh Month, Eleventh Day, Eleventh Hour: Armistice Day, 1918, World War I and Its Violent Climax.

In May 2013, he published his last book, Roosevelt's Centurions: FDR and the Commanders He Led to Victory in World War II, through Random House.

== Death and burial ==
Persico died in hospice at St. Peter's Hospital in Albany, New York, the morning of August 30, 2014. He was buried at Gerald B. H. Solomon Saratoga National Cemetery in Schuylerville, New York.

== Personal life ==
He was married to Sylvia Palma LaVista and they had two daughters.

== General Reference ==
- Joseph E. Persico Papers, 1910-2003. M.E. Grenander Department of Special Collections and Archives, University Libraries, University at Albany, State University of New York (hereafter referred to as the Persico Papers).
