= Treaty of Fifth Avenue =

1960 revision of the US Republican Party platform by Richard Nixon and Nelson Rockefeller

The Treaty of Fifth Avenue refers to the agreement reached between two Republicans, U.S. vice president Richard Nixon and New York governor Nelson Rockefeller, in July 1960.

Although Rockefeller had little influence over the Republican Party's conservative wing, he was the de facto leader of the liberal Republicans. Nixon felt he needed the support of Rockefeller to secure the Republican Party nomination. Nixon feared that Rockefeller, who had recently written an indictment of the Republican Party, would refuse to support him unless the party platform was changed. Nixon and Rockefeller met at Rockefeller's Fifth Avenue apartment in New York City where, over the course of four hours, and with other participants joining by phone, they agreed to this fourteen-point compact of security and economic issues. The compact called for increased defense spending on U.S. nuclear capability as well as the establishment of a flexible response force to deal with armed conflicts. In addition, the document supports planks to the party platform that stimulate economic growth, "remove the last vestiges of segregation or discrimination", and provide government funding for education. While the compromise might not have profoundly changed the party's platform, it strained Nixon's relations with the party's conservative members who disagreed with Rockefeller's more liberal views.

== First-hand account ==
From Steven Hess, who worked with Richard Nixon:

"The platform committee met at the Blackstone Hotel, Chicago, a week before the convention convened. On July 22, 10:30 pm, we are gathered in the suite of Charles Percy, the committee chairman, waiting for the final draft to be typed so that the committee can give its approval in the morning. The phone rings and from Percy's response this is no ordinary call. Nixon has flown secretly to New York to meet with arch foe Nelson Rockefeller in his Fifth Avenue apartment. They are now telling Percy what they wish to have in the platform. There are three phone connections in the suite: Percy is on one; Rod Perkins, Rockefeller's representative is on the second; I am one of the people rotating on the third. The call lasts nearly four hours, except for when the hotel switchboard operator pulls the plugs at midnight and goes home, causing a 15 minute interruption. This is "The Compact of Fifth Avenue," so named by headline writers. The committee's reaction is explosive: We will not be dictated to, and especially not by Rockefeller. Their revolt lasts 36 hours. Eisenhower is furious over new wording in the defense plank, which we quietly delete. Nixon rushes to Chicago to calm the delegates, also raising questions about his political smarts."

== Statement by Governor Rockefeller ==
The Vice President and I met today at my home in New York City.

The meeting took place at the Vice President's request.

The purpose of the meeting was to discuss the platform of the Republican party. During the course of the meeting we discussed our views with Chairman Percy and other members of the platform committee by telephone.

The Vice President and I reached agreement on the following specific and basic positions on foreign policy and national defense:

1. The growing vigor and aggressiveness of communism demands new and profound effort and action in all areas of American Life.

2. The vital need of our foreign policy is new political creativity—leading and inspiring the formation, in all great regions of the free world, of confederations, large enough and strong enough to meet modern problems and challenges. We should promptly lead toward the formation of such confederations in the North Atlantic community and in the Western Hemisphere.

3. In the field of disarmament we shall

a. Intensify the quest for better detection methods;
b. Discontinue nuclear weapon tests in the atmosphere;
c. Discontinue other tests as detection methods make possible, and,
d. Resume immediately underground nuclear testing for purposes of improving methods of detection.

4. In national defense, the swiftness of the technological revolution—and the warning signs of Soviet aggressiveness—makes clear that new efforts are necessary, for the facts of our survival in the Nineteen Fifties give no assurance of such survival, in the same military posture, in the Nineteen Sixties.

5. The two imperatives of national security in the Nineteen Sixties are:

a. A powerful second—strike capacity—a nuclear retaliatory power capable of surviving surprise attack to inflict devastating punishment on any aggressor, and,
b. A modern, flexible and balanced military establishment with forces capable of deterring or meeting any local aggression.
c. These imperatives require: More and improved bombers, airborne alert, speeded production of missiles and Polaris submarines, accelerated dispersal and hardening of bases, full modernization of the equipment of our ground forces, and an intensified program for civil defense.

6. The United States can afford and must provide the increased expenditures to implement fully this necessary program for strengthening our defense posture. There must be no price ceiling on America's security.

The Vice President and I also reached agreement on the following specific positions on domestic affairs:

1. Our government must be reorganized—especially in supporting the President in the crucial decision-making process—to cope effectively with modern problems and challenges. Specifically, this calls for:

a. Creation of a post to assist the President in the whole area of national security and international affairs;
b. Creation of a post to assist in planning and management of domestic affairs, and,
c. Reorganization of defense planning and command to achieve under the President, unified doctrine and unified direction of forces.

2. The rate of our economic growth must, as promptly as possible, be accelerated by policies and programs stimulating our free enterprise system—to allow us to meet the demands of national defense and the growing social needs and a higher standard of living for our growing population. As the Vice President pointed out in a speech in 1958, the achievement of a 5 per cent rate of growth would produce an additional $10,000,000,000 of tax reserve in 1962.

3. Our farm programs must be realistically reoriented by:

a. Finding and encouraging ways for our low income farmers to become more productive members of our growing economy;
b. At least doubling of the Conservation Reserve;
c. Use of price supports at level best-fitted to specific commodity in order to widen markets, ease production controls, and help achieve equitable farm income;
d. Faster disposal of surpluses through an expanded "Food for Peace" program and allocation of some surplus to a stock pile for civil defense.

4. Our program for civil rights must assure aggressive action to remove the remaining vestiges of segregation or discrimination in all areas of national life—voting and housing, schools and jobs. It will express support for the objectives of the sit-in demonstrators and will commend the action of those business men who have abandoned the practice of refusing to serve food at their lunch counters to their Negro customers and will urge all others to follow their example.

5. Our program for health insurance for the aged shall provide insurance on a sound fiscal basis through a contributory system under which beneficiaries have the option of purchasing private health insurance.

6. Our program for labor, while reaffirming our efforts to support and strengthen the processes of free collective bargaining, shall provide for improved procedures for the resolution of disputes endangering the national welfare.

7. Our program for educational needs [sic] by calling for prompt and substantial grant aid for school construction primarily on the basis of financial needs, under an equalization formula, and with matching funds by the states—including these further measures for higher education: grants-in-aid for such buildings as classrooms and laboratories, an expanded loan program for dormitories, expanded student loan and graduate fellowship programs and inauguration of a program of federal scholarships for the most able undergraduates.

These constitute the basic positions for which I have been fighting.

If they are embodied in the Republican Party platform, as adopted by the convention, they will constitute a platform that I can support with pride and vigor.

== Statement by Vice President Nixon ==
"Governor Rockefeller and I have been in consultation with the Platform Committee since its sessions began. By yesterday, it was apparent that there was a general agreement among members of the committee and between the Governor and myself regarding the basic philosophy to be followed as we go into the 1960 campaign.

Whatever differences that existed between Governor Rockefeller and myself were matters more of specifics than of principle. I felt it in the best interests of both our country and the Republican party at this critical time in history that it be made clear that we stood firmly together on these important issues.

Therefore, I called Governor Rockefeller and arranged a private meeting last night. The text of the statement released by the Governor defines our area of agreement and provides a guide to our thinking for the consideration of the Platform Committee."

== Bibliography ==
- Hess, Stephen "Nixon Sightings, Pt. II : The 1960 Elections Brookings Institution, December 16, 2014
- Nixon, Richard M. and Nelson A. Rockefeller. "The Treaty of Fifth Avenue." New York Times, July 24, 1960. American History Online. Facts On File, Inc.
