= Nelson Rockefeller =

Vice President of the United States from 1974 to 1977

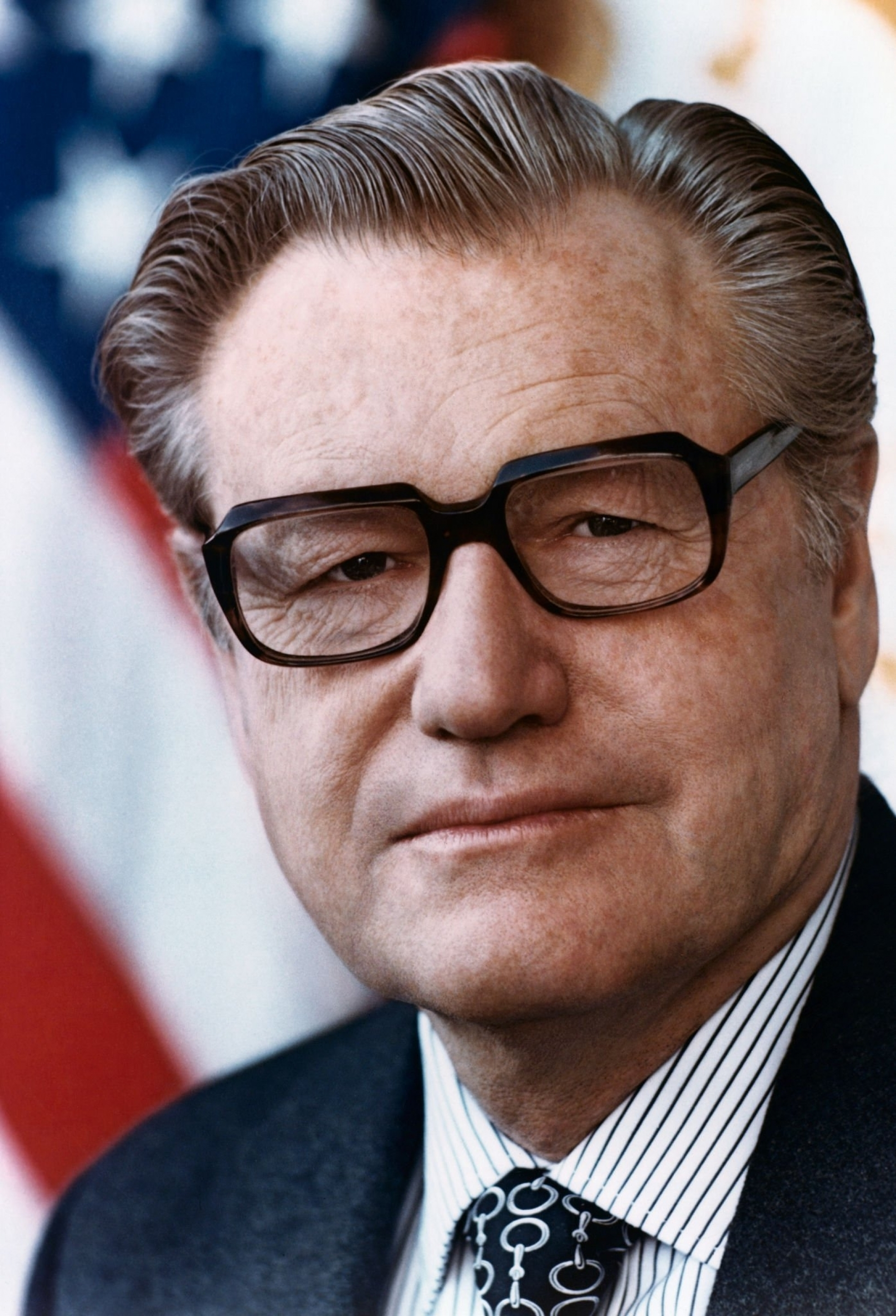
- Official portrait, 1975

41st Vice President of the United States
- In office December 19, 1974 – January 20, 1977
- President: Gerald Ford
- Preceded by: Gerald Ford
- Succeeded by: Walter Mondale

49th Governor of New York
- In office January 1, 1959 – December 18, 1973
- Lieutenant: Malcolm Wilson
- Preceded by: W. Averell Harriman
- Succeeded by: Malcolm Wilson

1st Under Secretary of Health, Education and Welfare
- In office June 11, 1953 – December 22, 1954
- President: Dwight D. Eisenhower
- Preceded by: Position established
- Succeeded by: Herold Christian Hunt

1st Assistant Secretary of State for American Republic Affairs
- In office December 20, 1944 – August 17, 1945
- President: Franklin D. Roosevelt; Harry S. Truman
- Preceded by: Position established
- Succeeded by: Spruille Braden

Personal details
- Born: Nelson Aldrich Rockefeller; July 8, 1908 Bar Harbor, Maine, U.S.
- Died: January 26, 1979 (aged 70) New York City, U.S.
- Resting place: Rockefeller Family Cemetery, Sleepy Hollow, New York, U.S.
- Party: Republican
- Spouses: Mary Todhunter Clark (m. 1930; div. 1962); Margaretta Large "Happy" Fitler (m. 1963)
- Children: 7, including Rodman, Ann, Steven, Michael, and Mark
- Parents: John D. Rockefeller Jr.; Abby Aldrich
- Relatives: Rockefeller family
- Education: Dartmouth College (AB)
- Nelson Rockefeller's voice Rockefeller's speech following his 1974 vice presidential confirmation Recorded December 19, 1974

Nelson Aldrich Rockefeller (July 8, 1908 – January 26, 1979) was the 41st vice president of the United States, serving from 1974 to 1977 under President Gerald Ford. A member of the Republican Party and the wealthy Rockefeller family, he was the 49th governor of New York from 1959 to 1973. He was the leader of the moderate faction of his party, known as the Rockefeller Republicans.

After graduating from Dartmouth College in 1930, Rockefeller worked at various businesses connected to his family. He served as Assistant Secretary of State for American Republic Affairs for presidents Franklin D. Roosevelt and Harry S. Truman (1944–1945), and as Undersecretary of Health, Education and Welfare (HEW) under Dwight D. Eisenhower from 1953 to 1954. He was first elected governor of New York in 1958, and was re-elected in 1962, 1966, and 1970. As governor of New York, Rockefeller's achievements included the expansion of the State University of New York (SUNY), efforts to protect the environment, the construction of the Empire State Plaza in Albany, increased facilities and personnel for medical care, and the creation of the New York State Council on the Arts. Rockefeller was often considered to be liberal, progressive, or moderate. In an agreement that was termed the Treaty of Fifth Avenue, he persuaded Richard Nixon to alter the Republican Party platform just before the 1960 Republican National Convention.

After unsuccessfully seeking the Republican presidential nomination in 1960, 1964, and 1968, Rockefeller was appointed vice president of the United States by President Gerald Ford in December 1974. Rockefeller was the second vice president appointed to the position under the 25th Amendment, following Ford himself. Rockefeller did not seek a full term in the 1976 election with Ford, who named Kansas senator Bob Dole as his running mate instead of Rockefeller that year. Rockefeller retired from politics in 1977 and died two years later from a heart attack.

As a businessman, Rockefeller was president and later chair of Rockefeller Center, Inc. He also formed the International Basic Economy Corporation in 1947. Rockefeller assembled a significant art collection and promoted public access to the arts. He served as trustee, treasurer, and president of the Museum of Modern Art and founded the Museum of Primitive Art in 1954. In the area of philanthropy, he founded the Rockefeller Brothers Fund in 1940 with his four brothers and established the American International Association for Economic and Social Development in 1946.

== Early life and education (1908–1930) ==
Nelson Aldrich Rockefeller was born on July 8, 1908, in Bar Harbor, Maine. Named Nelson Aldrich after his maternal grandfather Nelson W. Aldrich, he was the second son and third child of financier and philanthropist John Davison Rockefeller Jr. and philanthropist and socialite Abigail "Abby" Aldrich. He had two older siblings—Abby and John III—as well as three younger brothers: Laurance, Winthrop, and David. His father was the only son of Standard Oil co-founder John D. Rockefeller and schoolteacher Laura Spelman. His mother, Abby, was a daughter of Senator Nelson Wilmarth Aldrich and Abigail P. Greene.

Rockefeller grew up in his family's homes in New York City (mainly at 10 West 54th Street), a country home in Pocantico Hills, New York, and a summer home in Seal Harbor, Maine. The family also travelled widely. He received his elementary, middle, and high school education at the Lincoln School in Manhattan, an experimental school administered by Teachers College of Columbia University and funded by the Rockefeller family. Rockefeller was known to disappear on the way to school and was once found exploring the city's sewer system. As a child, he was the "indisputable leader" of his brothers, becoming particularly close to Laurance.

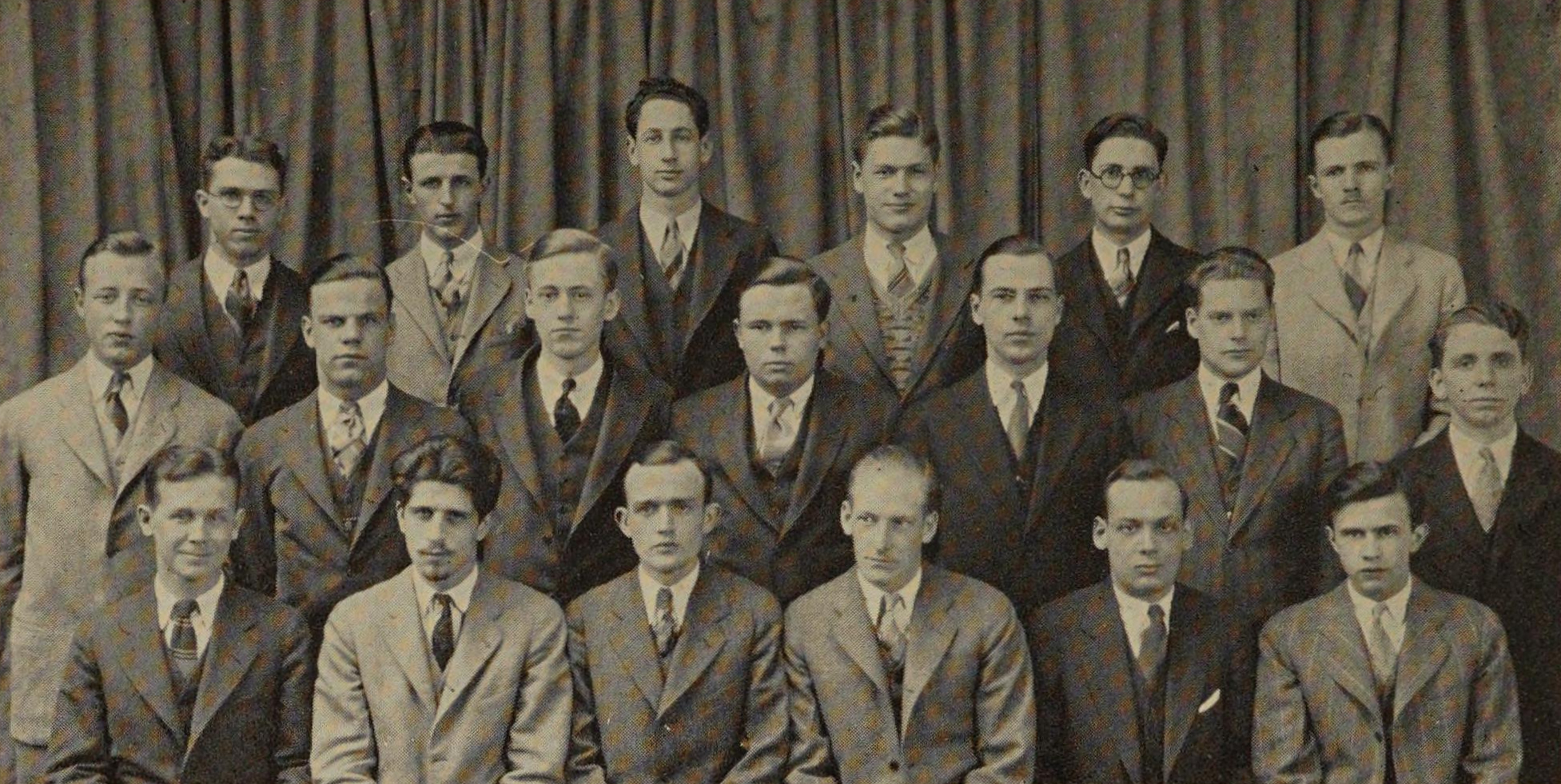
Rockefeller (top row, third from right) with other members of the Dartmouth Pictorial staff, 1928

Although his parents saw the potential for Rockefeller to succeed in life, he was a poor student. Generally in the lower third of his class, he almost failed ninth grade and had undiagnosed dyslexia. Biographer Joseph E. Persico wrote that as a child, Rockefeller "demonstrated a discipline that throughout life would serve him in lieu of brilliance". Although Rockefeller was not accepted into Princeton University, he gained admission to Dartmouth College, arriving on campus in 1926. While in college, he met Mary Todhunter Clark at the summer home in Maine, and the two fell in love. They were engaged in autumn 1929. In 1930, he graduated cum laude with an A.B. degree in economics from Dartmouth, where he was a member of Casque and Gauntlet (a senior society), Phi Beta Kappa, and Psi Upsilon. Rockefeller and Mary were married after he graduated, on June 23, 1930, at Bala Cynwyd, Pennsylvania.

== Early career (1931–1939) ==
Following his graduation, Rockefeller worked in a number of family-related businesses, including Chase National Bank; Rockefeller Center, Inc., joining the board of directors in 1931, serving as president, 1938–1945 and 1948–1951, and as chairman, 1945–1953 and 1956–1958; and Creole Petroleum Corporation, the Venezuelan subsidiary of Standard Oil of New Jersey, 1935–1940. Rockefeller served as a member of the Westchester County Board of Health from 1933 to 1953. His service with Creole Petroleum led to his deep, lifelong interest in Latin America and he became fluent in the Spanish language.

== Mid-career (1940–1958) ==
=== Coordinator of Inter-American Affairs (CIAA) ===
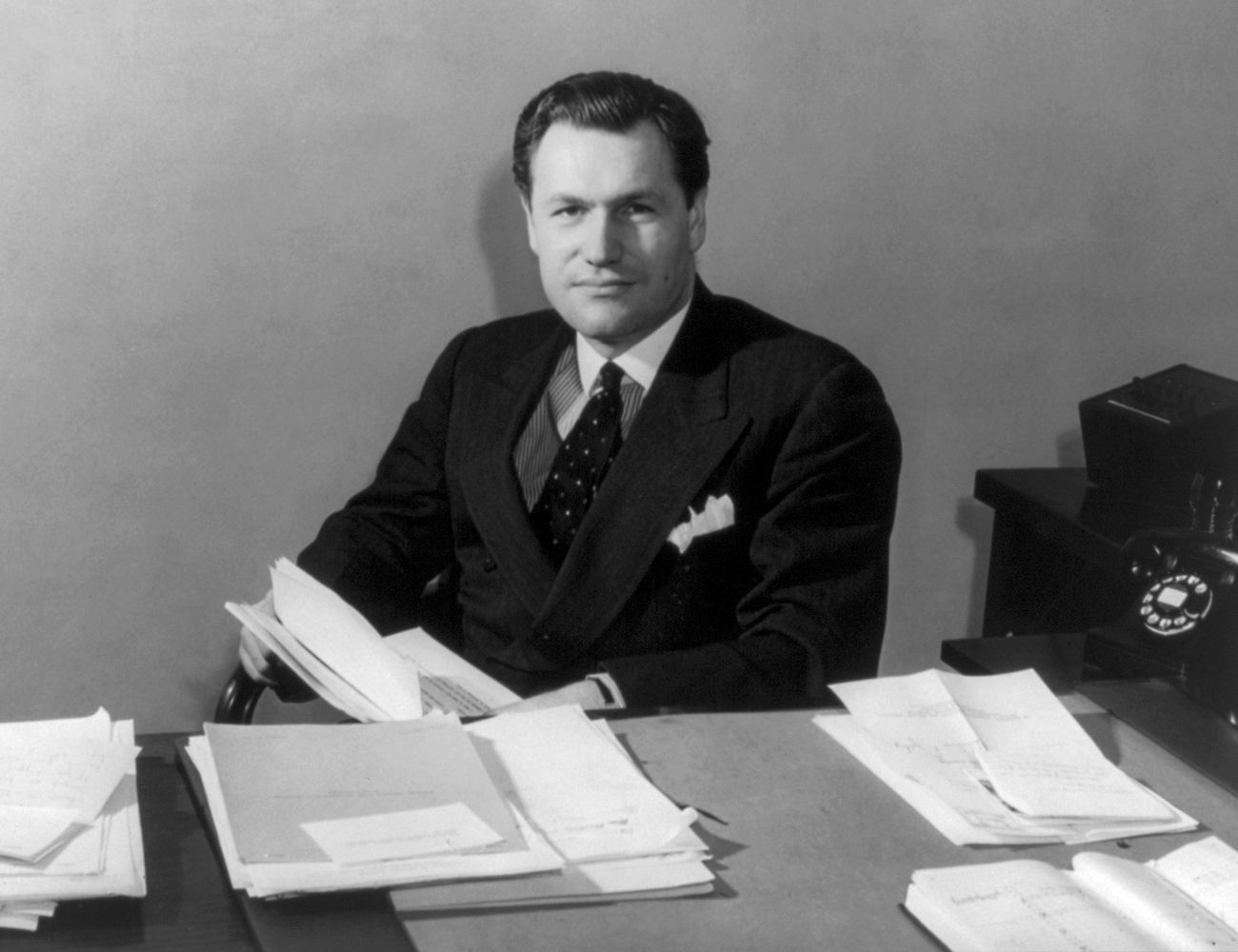
Rockefeller as Coordinator of Inter-American Affairs in 1940

In 1940, after he expressed his concern to President Franklin D. Roosevelt over Nazi influence in Latin America, the President appointed Rockefeller to the new position of Coordinator of Inter-American Affairs (CIAA) in the Office of the Coordinator of Inter-American Affairs (OCIAA). Rockefeller was charged with overseeing a program of U.S. cooperation with the nations of Latin America to help raise the standard of living, to achieve better relations among the nations of the western hemisphere, and to counter rising Nazi influence in the region. He facilitated this form of cultural diplomacy by collaborating with the director of Latin American Relations at the CBS radio network Edmund A. Chester.

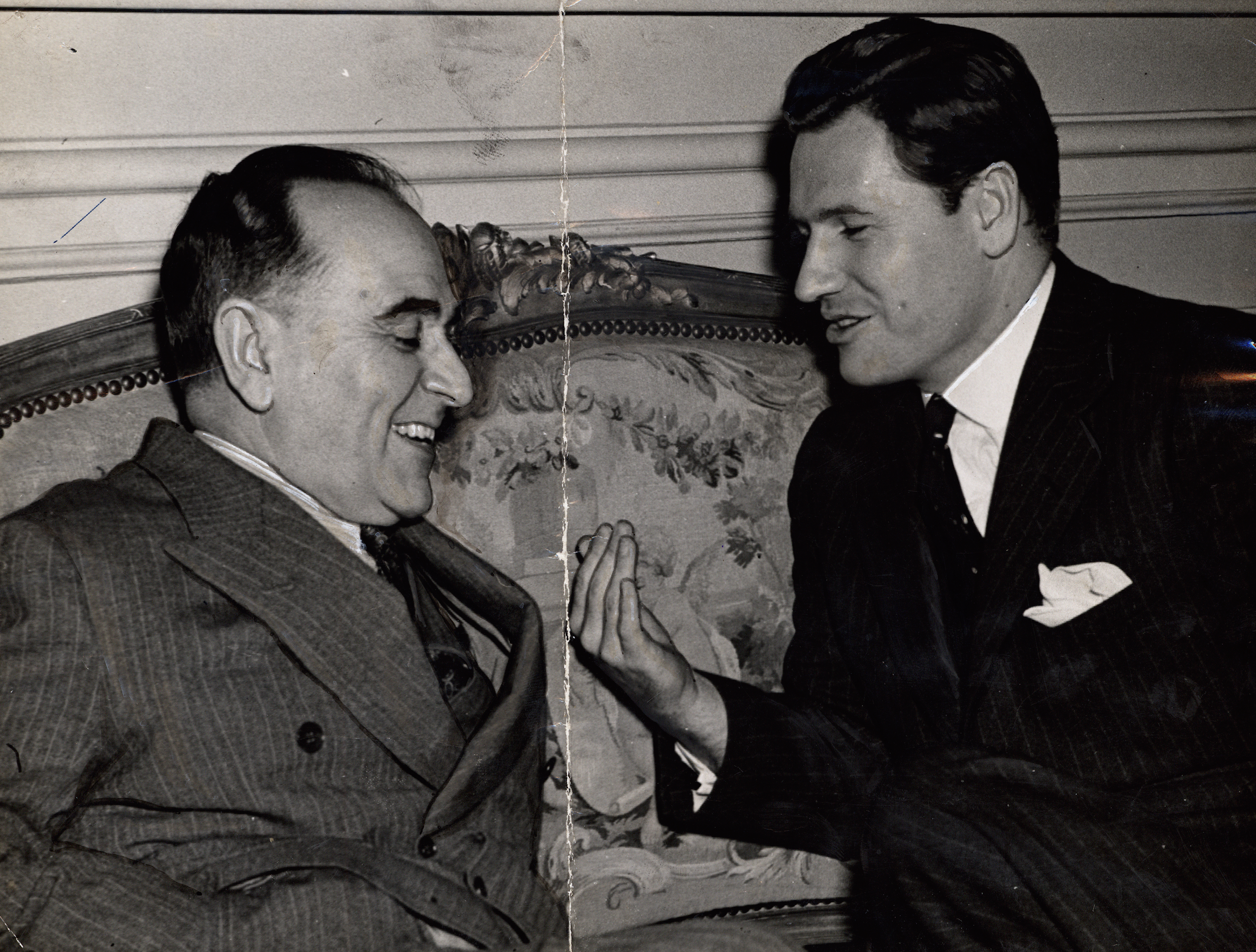
Rockefeller (right) with Brazilian President Getúlio Vargas in 1942

Roosevelt and his cabinet encouraged Hollywood to produce films to encourage positive relations with Latin America. Rockefeller required changes in the movie Down Argentine Way (1940) because it was considered offensive to Argentines. It was much more popular in the United States than in Latin America. Charlie Chaplin's satirical The Great Dictator (1940) was banned in several countries.

In the spring of 1943, Rockefeller supported extensive negotiations and the mission of North American members of the Junior Chamber of Commerce to Latin America as Coordinator of Inter-American Affairs of the U.S. State Department, establishing the Junior Chamber International after its first Inter-American Congress in December 1944 at Mexico City. After coming back from the Inter-American Congress, Rockefeller convinced his father, John D. Rockefeller Jr., to donate the land to the city of New York to build the foundations of what would later become the United Nations Headquarters.

=== Assistant Secretary of State for American Republic Affairs ===
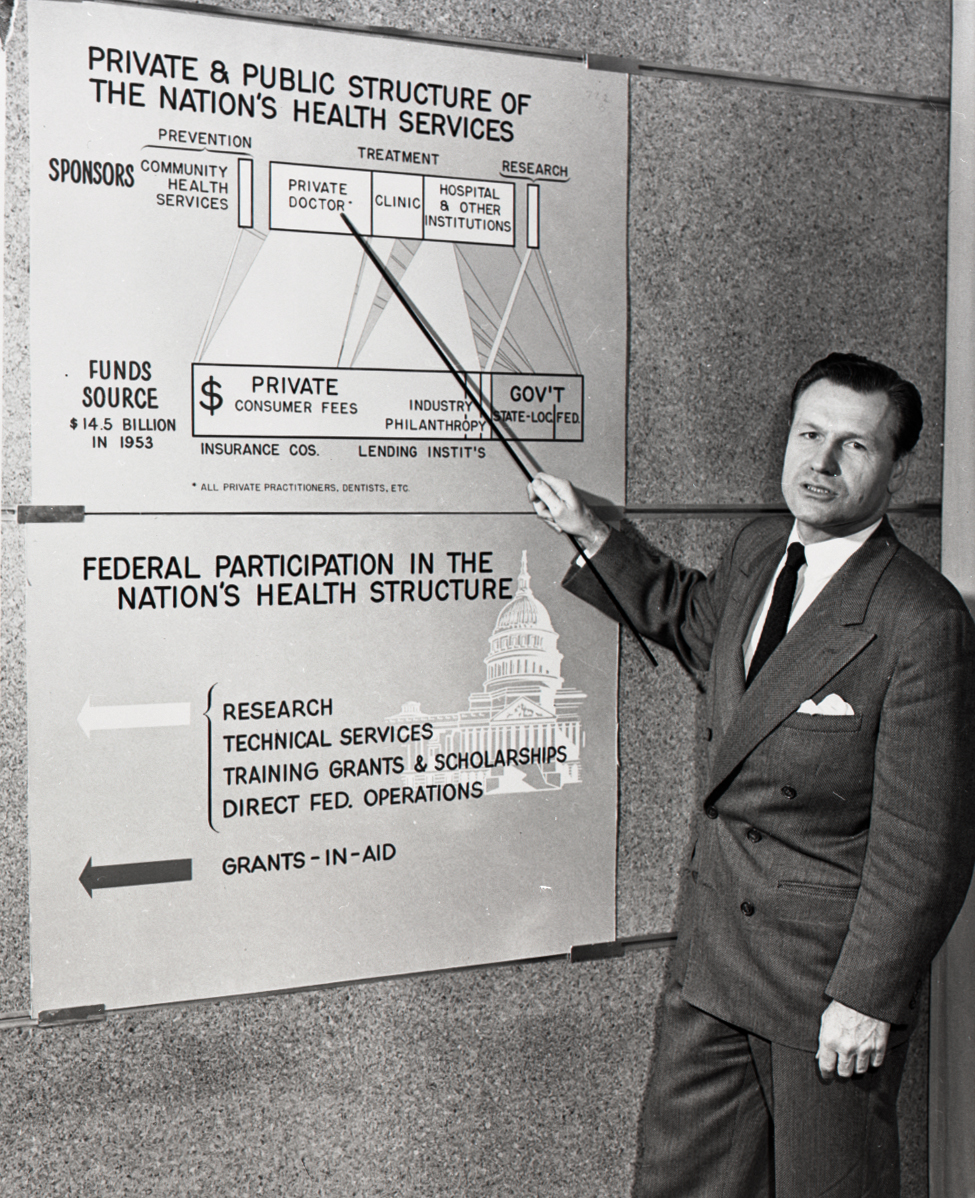
Rockefeller, Under Secretary of Health, Education and Welfare, makes a presentation on a proposed public/private health reinsurance program in 1954.

In 1944, President Roosevelt appointed Rockefeller Assistant Secretary of State for American Republic Affairs. As assistant secretary of state, he initiated the Inter-American Conference on Problems of War and Peace in 1945. The conference produced the Act of Chapultepec, which provided the framework for economic, social, and defense cooperation among the nations of the Americas and set the principle that an attack on one of these nations would be regarded as an attack on all and jointly resisted. Rockefeller signed the Act on behalf of the United States.

Rockefeller was a member of the U.S. delegation at the United Nations (UN) Conference on International Organization at San Francisco in 1945; this gathering marked the UN's founding. At the Conference, there was considerable opposition to the idea of permitting, within the UN charter, the formation of regional pacts such as the Act of Chapultepec. Rockefeller, who believed that inclusion was essential, especially to U.S. policy in Latin America, successfully urged the need for regional pacts within the framework of the UN. Rockefeller was also instrumental in persuading the UN to establish its headquarters in New York City. President Truman fired Rockefeller, reversed his policies, and shut down the OCIAA. Reich says that in official Washington, Rockefeller had become "a discredited figure, a pariah". He returned to New York.

=== International Basic Economy Corporation (IBEC) ===
Rockefeller formed the International Basic Economy Corporation (IBEC) in 1947 to jointly continue the work he had begun as Coordinator of Inter-American Affairs. He intermittently served as president through 1958. IBEC was a for-profit business that established companies that would stimulate the underdeveloped economies of certain countries. It was hoped that the success of these companies would encourage investors in those countries to set up competing or supporting businesses and further stimulate the local economy. Rockefeller established model farms in Venezuela, Ecuador, and Brazil. He maintained a home at Monte Sacro, the farm in Venezuela.

=== Chairman of the International Development Advisory Board ===
Rockefeller returned to public service in 1950 when President Harry S. Truman appointed him chairman of the International Development Advisory Board. The Board was charged with developing a plan for implementing the President's Point IV program of providing foreign technical assistance. In 1952, President-Elect Dwight D. Eisenhower asked Rockefeller to chair the President's Advisory Committee on Government Organization to recommend ways of improving the efficiency and effectiveness of the executive branch of the federal government. Rockefeller recommended thirteen reorganization plans, all of which were implemented. The plans implemented organizational changes in the Department of Defense, the Office of Defense Mobilization, and the Department of Agriculture. His recommendations also led to the creation of the Department of Health, Education and Welfare. Rockefeller was appointed Under-Secretary of this new department in 1953. Rockefeller was active in HEW's legislative program and implemented measures that added ten million people under the Social Security program.

=== Special assistant to the president for foreign affairs ===
In 1954, Rockefeller was appointed special assistant to the president for foreign affairs, sometimes referred to as special assistant to the president for psychological warfare. He was tasked with providing the president with advice and assistance in developing programs by which the various departments of the government could counter Soviet foreign policy challenges. As part of this responsibility, he was named as the president's representative on the Operations Coordinating Board, a committee of the National Security Council. The other members were the Undersecretary of State, the Deputy Secretary of Defense, the director of the Foreign Operations Administration, and the Central Intelligence Agency director. The OCB's purpose was to oversee the coordinated execution of security policy and plans, including clandestine operations.

Rockefeller broadly interpreted his directive and became an advocate for foreign economic aid as indispensable to national security. Most of Rockefeller's initiatives were blocked by Secretary of State John Foster Dulles and his Under Secretary, Herbert Hoover Jr., both traditionalists who resented what they perceived as outside interference from Rockefeller, and by Treasury Secretary George M. Humphrey for financial reasons. In June 1955, Rockefeller convened a week-long meeting of experts from various disciplines to assess the United States position in the psychological aspects of the Cold War and develop proposals that could give the United States the initiative at the upcoming Summit Conference in Geneva. The meeting was held at the Marine Corps school at Quantico, Virginia, and became known as the Quantico Study. The Quantico panel developed a proposal called "open skies" wherein the United States and the Soviet Union (USSR) would exchange blueprints of military installations and agree to mutual aerial reconnaissance. Thus, military buildups would be revealed, minimizing the danger of surprise attacks. It was a counter proposal to the Soviet proposal of universal disarmament. The feeling was that the Soviets could not refuse the proposal if they were serious about disarmament.

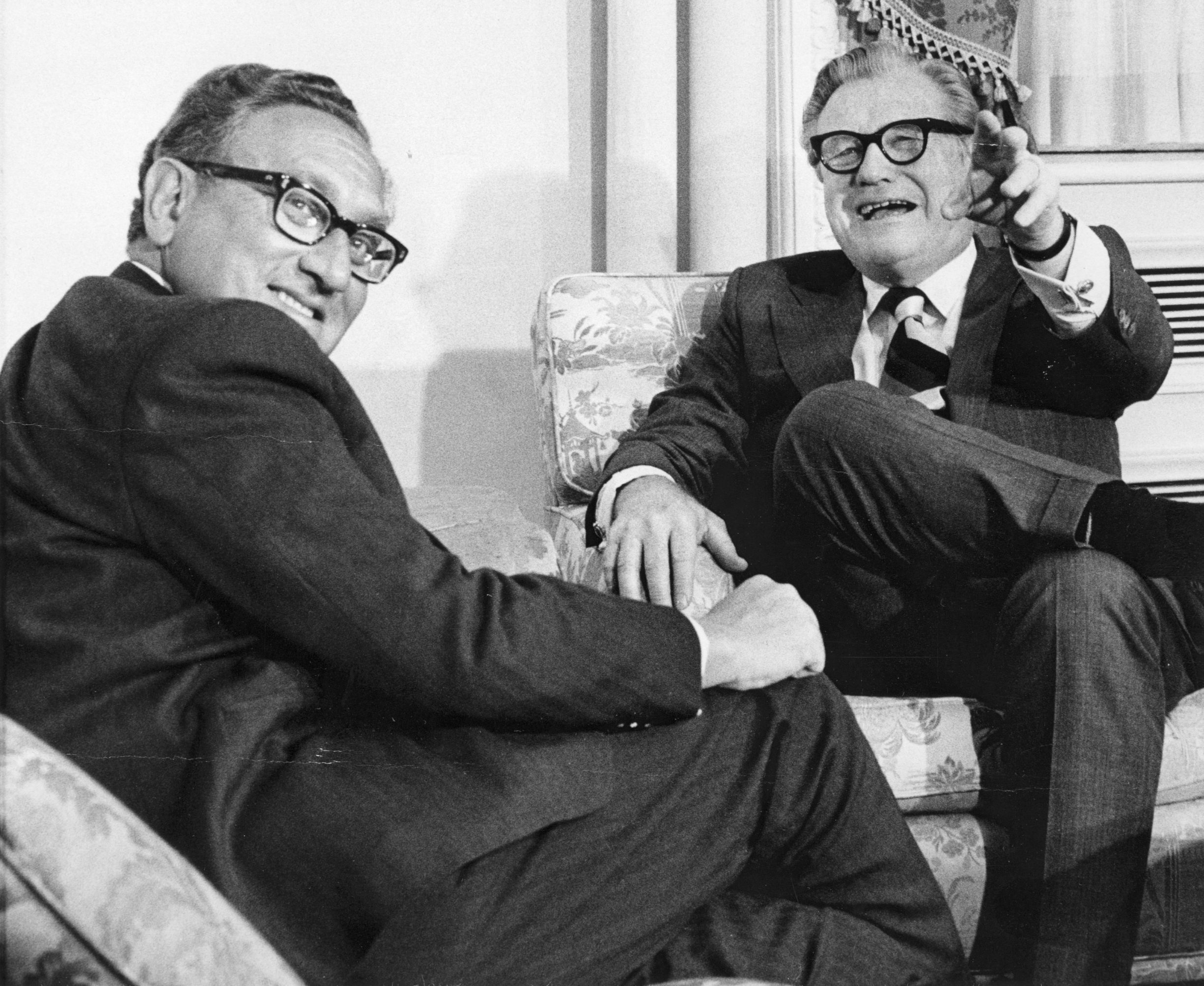
Vice President Rockefeller (right) with Secretary of State Henry Kissinger on January 3, 1975

In March 1955, Rockefeller proposed the creation of the Planning Coordination Group, a small high-level group that would plan and develop national security operations, both overt and covert. The group consisted of the Undersecretary of State, the Deputy Secretary of Defense, the director the Central Intelligence Agency (CIA), and special assistant Rockefeller as chairman. The group's purpose was to oversee CIA operation and other anti-Communist actions; however, State Department officials and CIA director Allen Dulles refused to cooperate with the group and its initiatives were stymied or ignored. In September 1955, Rockefeller recommended the abolishment of the PCG, and in December of the same year he resigned as special assistant to the president. In 1956, Rockefeller created the Special Studies Project, a major seven-panel planning group directed by Henry Kissinger and funded by the Rockefeller Brothers Fund, of which he was then president. It was an ambitious study created to define the central problems and opportunities facing the United States in the future, and to clarify national purposes and objectives. The reports were published individually as they were released and were republished together in 1961 as Prospect for America: The Rockefeller Panel Reports.

The Special Studies Project came into national prominence with the early release of its military subpanel's report, whose principal recommendation was a massive military buildup to counter a then-perceived military superiority threat posed by the USSR. The report was released two months after the October 1957 launch of Sputnik, and its recommendations were fully endorsed by Eisenhower in his January 1958 State of the Union address. This initial contact with Kissinger was to develop into a lifelong relationship; Kissinger was later to be described as his closest intellectual associate. From this period Rockefeller employed Kissinger as a personally funded part-time consultant, principally on foreign policy issues, until the appointment to his staff became full-time in late 1968. In 1969, when Kissinger entered Richard Nixon's administration, Rockefeller paid him $50,000 as a severance payment.

== Governor of New York (1959–1973) ==
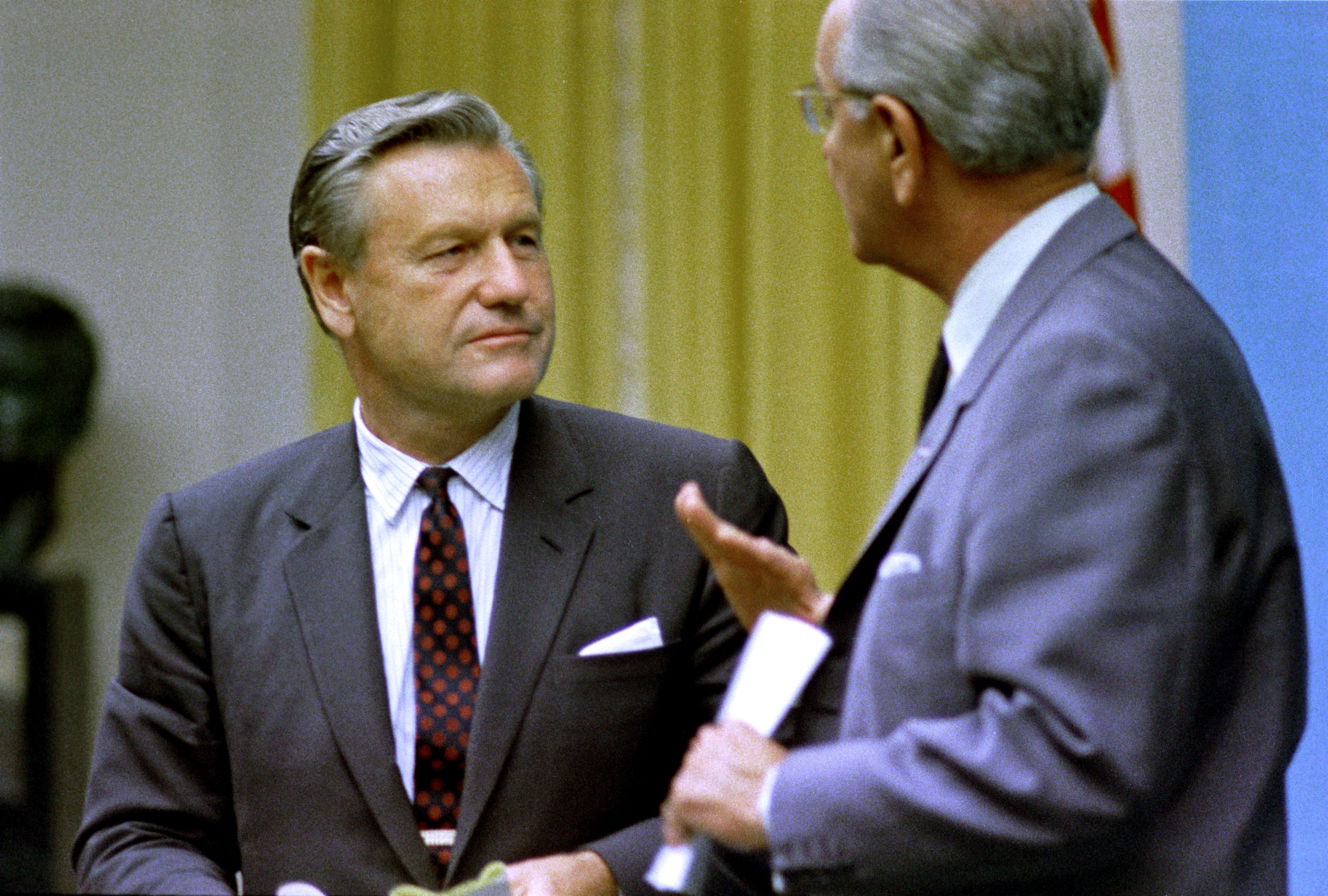
Governor Rockefeller meeting with President Lyndon B. Johnson in 1968

Rockefeller resigned from the federal government in 1956 to focus on New York State and on national politics. From September 1956 to April 1958, he chaired the Temporary State Commission on the Constitutional Convention. That was followed by his chairmanship of the Special Legislative Committee on the Revision and Simplification of the Constitution. In the 1958 New York state election, he was elected governor of New York by over 570,000 votes, defeating incumbent W. Averell Harriman, even though 1958 was a banner year for Democrats elsewhere in the nation. Rockefeller was re-elected in the three subsequent elections in 1962, 1966, and 1970, increasing the state's role in education, environmental protection, transportation, housing, welfare, medical aid, civil rights, and the arts. To pay for the increased government spending, Rockefeller increased taxation; for example, a sales tax was introduced in New York in 1965. He resigned three years into his fourth term and began to work at the Commission on Critical Choices for Americans.

=== Abortion ===
Rockefeller supported reform of New York's abortion laws beginning around 1968. The proposals supported by his administration would not have repealed the long-standing prohibition but would have expanded the exceptions allowed for the protection of the mother's health, or in circumstances of fetal abnormality. The reform bills did not pass; however, when an outright repeal of the prohibition managed to pass in 1970, Rockefeller signed it. In 1972, he vetoed another bill that would have restored the abortion ban. He said in his 1972 veto message, "I do not believe it right for one group to impose its vision of morality on an entire society."

=== Arts and culture ===
Rockefeller created the first State Council on the Arts in the country, which became a model for the National Endowment for the Arts. He also oversaw the construction of the Saratoga Performing Arts Center in Saratoga Spa State Park. He supported the bill, enacted in June 1966, which acquired Olana, home of Hudson River School artist Frederic Edwin Church, as a state historic site.

=== Buildings and public works ===
Rockefeller engaged in massive building projects that left a profound mark on the state of New York. (Some of his detractors claimed that he had an "Edifice Complex".) He was personally interested in the planning, design, and construction of the many projects initiated during his administration, consistent with his interest in architecture. In addition, Rockefeller's construction programs included the US$2 billion South Mall in Albany, later renamed the Nelson A. Rockefeller Empire State Plaza by Gov. Hugh Carey in 1978. It is a 98-acre (40 ha) campus of skyscrapers housing state offices and public plazas punctuated by an egg-shaped arts center. Along with the Empire State Plaza, in 1966 Rockefeller proposed the construction of the Adam Clayton Powell Jr. State Office Building in Harlem. The building was ultimately completed in 1973. While in office he supported the construction of the World Trade Center.

=== Civil rights ===
Rockefeller achieved virtual total prohibition of discrimination in housing and places of public accommodation. He outlawed job discrimination based on sex or age; increased by nearly 50% the number of African Americans and Hispanics holding state jobs; appointed women to head the largest number of state agencies in state history; prohibited discrimination against women in education, employment, housing and credit applications; admitted the first women to the State Police; initiated affirmative action programs for women in state government; and backed New York's ratification of the Equal Rights Amendment to the U.S. Constitution. He outlawed "block-busting" as a means of artificially depressing housing values and banned discrimination in the sale of all forms of insurance.

=== Commission on Critical Choices for Americans ===
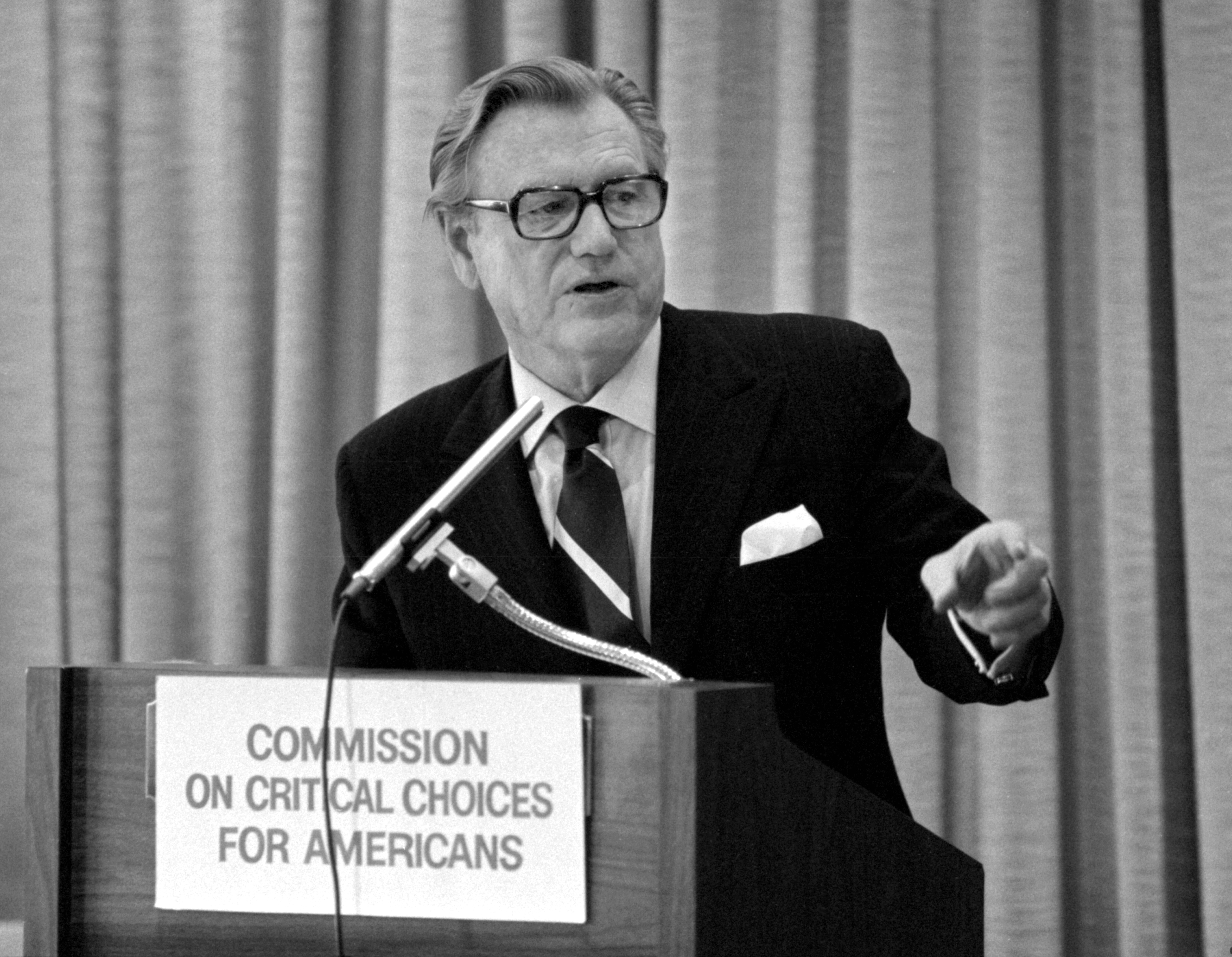
Rockefeller addresses a February 1975 meeting of the Commission on Critical Choices for Americans

In 1973, Rockefeller worked with former Delaware Governor Russell W. Peterson to establish the Commission on Critical Choices for Americans. The commission was a private study project on national and international policy similar to the Special Studies Project he led 15 years earlier. It was made up of a nationally representative, bipartisan group of 42 prominent Americans drawn from far-ranging fields of interest who served on a voluntary basis. Members included the majority and minority leaders of both houses of Congress. Rockefeller resigned as New York's governor in December 1973 in order to devote himself full-time to the commission's work as its chairman. He continued in that position after being sworn in as vice president, serving until February 28, 1975.

=== Conservation ===
Consistent with his personal interest in design and planning, Rockefeller began expansion of the New York State Parks system and improvement of park facilities. He persuaded voters to approve three major bond acts to raise more than $300 million for acquisition of park and forest preserve land, and he built or started 55 new state parks. Rockefeller initiated studies of environmental issues, such as loss of agricultural land through development—an issue now characterized as "sprawl". In September 1968, Rockefeller appointed the Temporary Study Commission on the Future of the Adirondacks. This led to his introduction to the Legislature in 1971 of a bill to create the controversial Adirondack Park Agency, which was designed to protect the Adirondack State Park from encroaching development. He also launched the Pure Waters Program, the first state bond issue to end water pollution; created the Department of Environmental Conservation; banned DDT and other pesticides; and established the Office of Parks and Recreation.

=== Crime ===
During his 15 years as governor, Rockefeller doubled the size of the state police, established the New York State Police Academy, adopted the "stop and frisk" and "no-knock" laws to strengthen police powers, and authorized 228 additional state judgeships to reduce court congestion. New York was the last state to have a mandatory death penalty for premeditated first degree murder. In 1963, Rockefeller signed legislation abandoning that and establishing a two-stage trial for murder cases with punishment determined in the second stage. Rockefeller was a supporter of capital punishment and oversaw 14 executions by electrocution as governor. The last execution, that of Eddie Mays in 1963, remains to date the last execution in New York and was the last execution before Furman v. Georgia in the Northeast. Despite his personal support for capital punishment, Rockefeller signed a bill in 1965 to abolish the death penalty except in cases involving the murder of police officers. Rockefeller was also a supporter of the "law and order" platform.

==== Attica prison riot ====
On September 9, 1971, prisoners at the state penitentiary at Attica, New York, took control of a cell block and seized thirty-nine correctional officers as hostages. After four days of negotiations, Department of Correctional Services Commissioner Russell Oswald agreed to most of the inmates' demands for various reforms but refused to grant complete amnesty to the rioters, with passage out of the country and removal of the prison's superintendent. When negotiations stalled and the hostages appeared to be in imminent danger, Rockefeller ordered New York State Police and National Guard troops to restore order and take back the prison on September 13. Thirty-nine people died in the assault, including ten of the hostages, nine of whom were killed by the State Police and National Guard soldiers. An additional eighty people were wounded in what was called "a turkey shoot" by state prosecutor Malcolm Bell.

A later investigation showed all but three of the deaths were caused by the gunfire of the National Guard and police. The other three were inmates killed by other inmates at the beginning of the riot. Opponents blamed Rockefeller for these deaths in part because of his refusal to go to the prison and negotiate with the inmates, while his supporters, including many conservatives who had often vocally differed with him in the past, defended his actions as being necessary to the preservation of law and order. Rockefeller later said: "I was trying to do the best I could to save the hostages, save the prisoners, restore order, and preserve our system without undertaking actions which could set a precedent which would go across this country like wildfire." In a telephone call with President Nixon, Rockefeller explained the deaths by saying "that's life".

=== Drugs ===
What became known as the "Rockefeller drug laws" were a product of Rockefeller's attempt to deal with the rapid increase in narcotics addiction and related crime. In 1962, he proposed a program of voluntary rehabilitation for addicted convicts rather than prison time. This was approved by the legislature but by 1966 it was evident that this program was not working, as most addicts chose short prison terms rather than three years of treatment. Rockefeller then turned to a program of compulsory treatment, rehabilitation, and aftercare for three years. While this program saw success in rehabilitating addicts, it did little to reduce the narcotics trade and associated crime. Rockefeller was also frustrated by his belief that the federal government was not doing anything significant to address the problem. Feeling that existing laws and the way they were being implemented did not solve the problem of the "drug pusher", and pressured by voters angry about the drug problem, Rockefeller proposed a hard-line approach. As approved by the legislature in 1973, the new drug laws included mandatory life sentences without the possibility of plea-bargaining or parole for all drug users, dealers, and those convicted of drug-related violent crimes; a $1,000 reward for information leading to the conviction of drug pushers; and removing less harsh penalties for youthful offenders. Public support for the measures was mixed, as were the results. They did not lead more addicts to seek rehabilitation as hoped, and ultimately did not solve the problem of drug trafficking. These were among the toughest drug laws in the United States when they were enacted and are still on the books, albeit in moderated form. To carry out the rehabilitation program, Rockefeller created the State Narcotics Addiction Control Commission, later the State Drug Abuse Control Commission. New York also provided the financial support for research in methadone maintenance and the administration of the largest methadone maintenance program in the United States.

=== Education ===
Rockefeller was the driving force in turning the State University of New York (SUNY) into the largest system of public higher education in the United States. Under his governorship it grew from 29 campuses and 38,000 full-time students to 72 campuses and 232,000 full-time students. Rockefeller championed the acquisition of the private University of Buffalo into the SUNY system, making the State University of New York at Buffalo, now the largest public university in New York. In 1971, he championed the creation of Empire State College to provide higher education to adults by removing impediments to access such as time, location, and institutional processes. Other accomplishments included more than quadrupling state aid to primary and secondary schools; providing the first state financial support for educational television; and requiring special education for children with disabilities in public schools.

=== Housing ===
To create more low-income housing, Rockefeller created the New York State Urban Development Corporation (UDC), later known as the Empire State Development Corporation, with unprecedented powers to override local zoning, condemn property, and create financing schemes to carry out desired development. The financing involved the creation of a new sort of bond—what came to be called "moral obligation" bonds. They were not backed by the full faith and credit of the state but the quasi-public arrangements were meant to, and did, convey the impression that the state would not let them fail. Rockefeller is criticized in some quarters for having contributed to the "Too big to fail" phenomenon in American finance in general. By 1973, the Rockefeller administration had completed or started over 88,000 units of housing for limited income families and the aging.

=== Miscellaneous programs ===
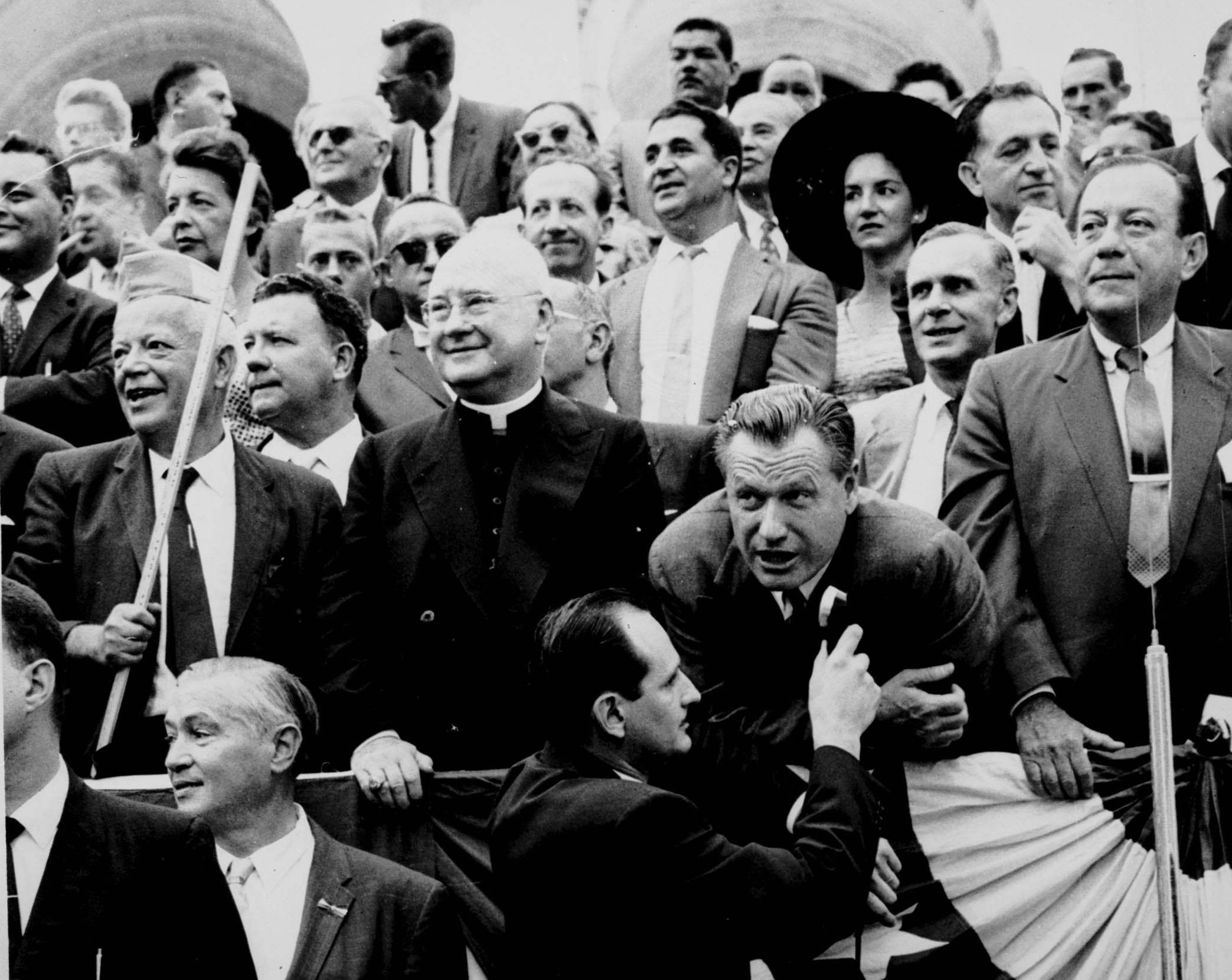
Rockefeller with labor leader David Dubinsky, Mayor Robert F. Wagner Jr., and Cardinal Spellman at the 1959 Labor Day Parade in New York City

Rockefeller worked with the legislature and unions to create generous pension programs for many public workers, such as teachers, professors, firefighters, police officers, and prison guards. He proposed the first statewide minimum wage law in the country; it was increased five times during his administration. Additional accomplishments of Rockefeller's fifteen years as governor of New York include initiating the state lottery and off-track betting; adopting modern treatment techniques in state mental hospitals to reduce the number of mentally ill patients by over 50%; creating the State Office of the Aging and constructing nearly 12,000 units of housing for the aging; the first mandatory seatbelt law in the United States; and creating the State Consumer Protection Board.

=== National Commission on Water Quality ===
In May 1973, President Nixon appointed Rockefeller chairman of the National Commission on Water Quality. The commission was charged with determining the technological, economic, social and environmental implications of meeting water quality standards mandated by the Federal Water Pollution Control Act Amendments of 1972. The commission issued its report in March 1976 and he testified before Congress on its findings.

=== Presidential Mission to Latin America ===
On February 17, 1969, President Nixon commissioned a study to assess the state of Latin America. Nixon appointed Rockefeller to direct the study. The poor relationship between the two politicians suggested that Nixon would not be that interested in the results of the study. There was a lack of interest for the region in the late 1960s to early 1970s.

In April and May 1969, at the request of President Nixon, Rockefeller and a team of 23 advisors visited 20 American republics during four trips to solicit opinions of their inter-American policies and to determine the needs and conditions of each country. Most of the trips turned out to be an embarrassment. Among the recommendations in Rockefeller's report to the President were preferential trade agreements with Latin American countries, refinancing the region's foreign debt, and removing bureaucratic impediments that prevented the efficient use of United States aid. The Nixon administration did little to implement the report's recommendations. In his report preface, Rockefeller wrote:

There is general frustration over the failure to achieve a more rapid improvement in standards of living. The United States, because of its identification with the failure of the Alliance for Progress to live up to expectations, is blamed. People in the countries concerned also used our visit as an opportunity to demonstrate their frustrations with the failure of their own governments to meet their needs ... demonstrations that began over grievances were taken over and exacerbated by anti-US and subversive elements which sought to weaken the United States, and their own governments in the process.

A major part of the Rockefeller report suggested a reduction of American involvement, stating that "we, in the United States, cannot determine the internal political structure of any other nation". Because there was little the United States should or could do toward changing the political atmosphere in other countries, there was no reason to attempt to use economic aid as a political tool. This was the justification to reduce economic aid in Latin America. The Rockefeller report called for some aid to continue but recommended creating more effective aid programs.

=== Transportation ===
In 1967 Rockefeller won approval of the largest state bond issue at the time ($2.5 billion) for the coordinated development of mass transportation, highways, and airports. He initiated the creation or expansion of over 22,000 miles (35,000 km) of highway, including the Long Island Expressway, the Southern Tier Expressway, the Adirondack Northway, and Interstate 81, which vastly improved road transportation in the state of New York. Rockefeller introduced the state's first support for mass transportation. He reformed the governance of New York City's transportation system, creating the New York Metropolitan Transportation Authority (MTA) in 1965. The MTA merged the New York City subway system with the publicly owned Triborough Bridge and Tunnel Authority, the Long Island Rail Road, Staten Island Rapid Transit, and operation of lines that would later become Metro-North Railroad, along with the newly created MTA Bus Company, which were purchased by the state from private owners in a massive public bailout of bankrupt railroads and struggling private bus companies located in Queens, New York. He also created the State Department of Transportation.

In taking over control of the Triborough Bridge and Tunnel Authority, Rockefeller shifted power away from Robert Moses, and in doing so became the first politician to win such a battle with the master builder Moses in decades. Under the New York MTA, toll revenue collected from the bridges and tunnels, which had previously been used to build more bridges, tunnels, and highways, now went to support mass transportation operations, thus shifting costs from general state funds to the motorist. In one controversial move, Rockefeller abandoned one of Moses's most desired projects, a Long Island Sound bridge from Rye, New York, to Oyster Bay, New York, in 1973 due to environmental opposition.

=== Welfare and Medicaid ===
In the area of public assistance, the Rockefeller administration oversaw the roll-out of New York's Medicaid program for low-income individuals; achieved the first major decline in New York State's welfare rolls since World War II; required employable welfare recipients to take available jobs or job training; began the state breakfast program for children in low income areas; and established the first state loan fund for nonprofit groups to start day-care centers. A supporter of universal healthcare, Rockefeller served as consultant for Senator Jacob Javits' "Medicare for All" bill that would expand benefits to every American. Rockefeller described universal healthcare as the wave of the future and as a human right.

== Presidential campaigns ==
=== 1960 ===
Rockefeller's bid in the 1960 Republican Party presidential primaries ended early when then-Vice President Richard Nixon surged ahead in the polls. After quitting the campaign, Rockefeller backed Nixon and concentrated his efforts on introducing more moderate planks into Nixon's platform, partially succeeding in the Treaty of Fifth Avenue.

=== 1964 ===
Rockefeller, as the leader of the Republicans' Eastern Establishment, began as the front-runner for the 1964 Republican Party presidential primaries against conservative Senator Barry Goldwater of Arizona, who led the conservative wing of the Republican Party. In 1963, a year after Rockefeller's divorce from his first wife, he married Margaretta "Happy" Murphy, a divorcee with four children, which alienated many Republican married women. The divorce was widely condemned by politicians, including Senator Prescott Bush of Connecticut, who condemned his infidelity, divorce, and remarriage. Rockefeller finished third in the New Hampshire primary in March, behind write-in Henry Cabot Lodge II (from neighboring Massachusetts) and Goldwater. He then endured poor showings in several more of the party primaries before winning an upset in Oregon in May. Rockefeller took a strong lead in the California primary, and his team seemed so assured of his victory that it cut advertising funds in the last days of his campaign; however, the birth of Rockefeller's child three days before the California primary put the divorce and remarriage issue back in the minds of voters. On primary election day, Rockefeller narrowly lost the California primary and dropped out of the race. At a discouraging point in the 1964 California primary campaign against Goldwater, his top political aide Stuart Spencer called on Rockefeller to "summon that fabled nexus of money, influence, and condescension known as the Eastern Establishment. 'You are looking at it, buddy,' Rockefeller told Spencer, 'I am all that is left.'" Although Rockefeller exaggerated, the collapse of his wing of the party was underway.

At the Republican National Convention in San Francisco in July, Rockefeller was given five minutes to speak before the convention in defense of five amendments to the party platform put forth by the moderate wing of the Republican Party, and to counter the Goldwater plank. He was booed and heckled for sixteen minutes while he stood firmly at the podium insisting on his right to speak. Goldwater supporters claimed that the booing was from not the convention floor but the gallery. Rockefeller was reluctant to support Goldwater in the general election. Rockefeller's stump speeches often used the phrase "the brotherhood of man, under the fatherhood of God"; reporters covering his campaign came to abbreviate the expression as BOMFOG.

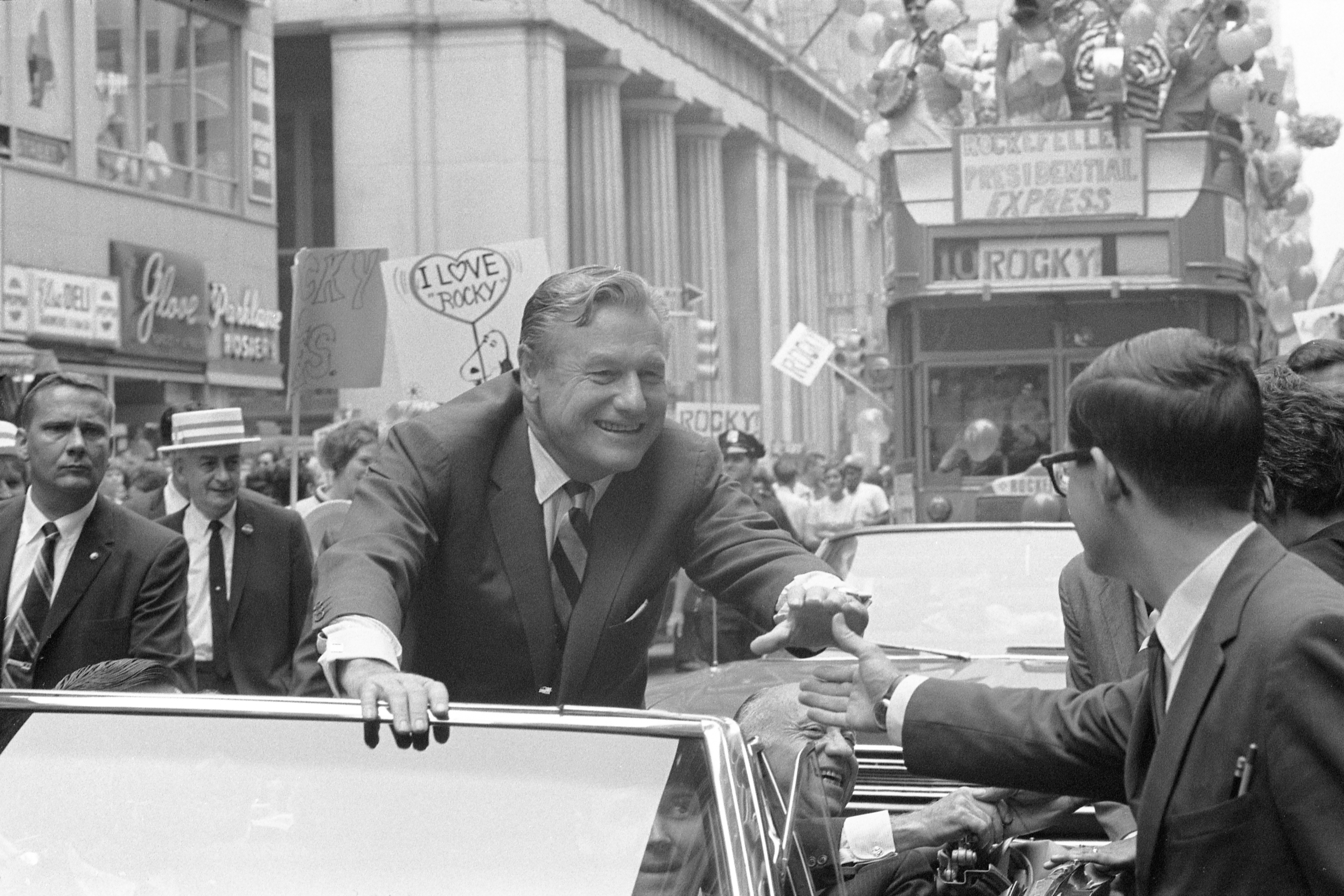
Rockefeller campaigning for the Republican presidential nomination in 1968

=== 1968 ===
Rockefeller again sought the presidential nomination in the 1968 Republican Party presidential primaries. His opponents were Nixon and Governor Ronald Reagan of California. In the contest, Rockefeller again represented the liberals, Reagan representing the conservatives, and Nixon representing moderates and conservatives. Shortly before the Republican convention, Rockefeller finally let it be known that he was available to be the nominee, and he sought to round up uncommitted delegates and woo reluctant Nixon delegates to his banner, armed with public opinion polls that showed him doing better among voters than either Nixon or Reagan against Democrat Hubert Humphrey. Despite Rockefeller's efforts, Nixon won the nomination on the first ballot.

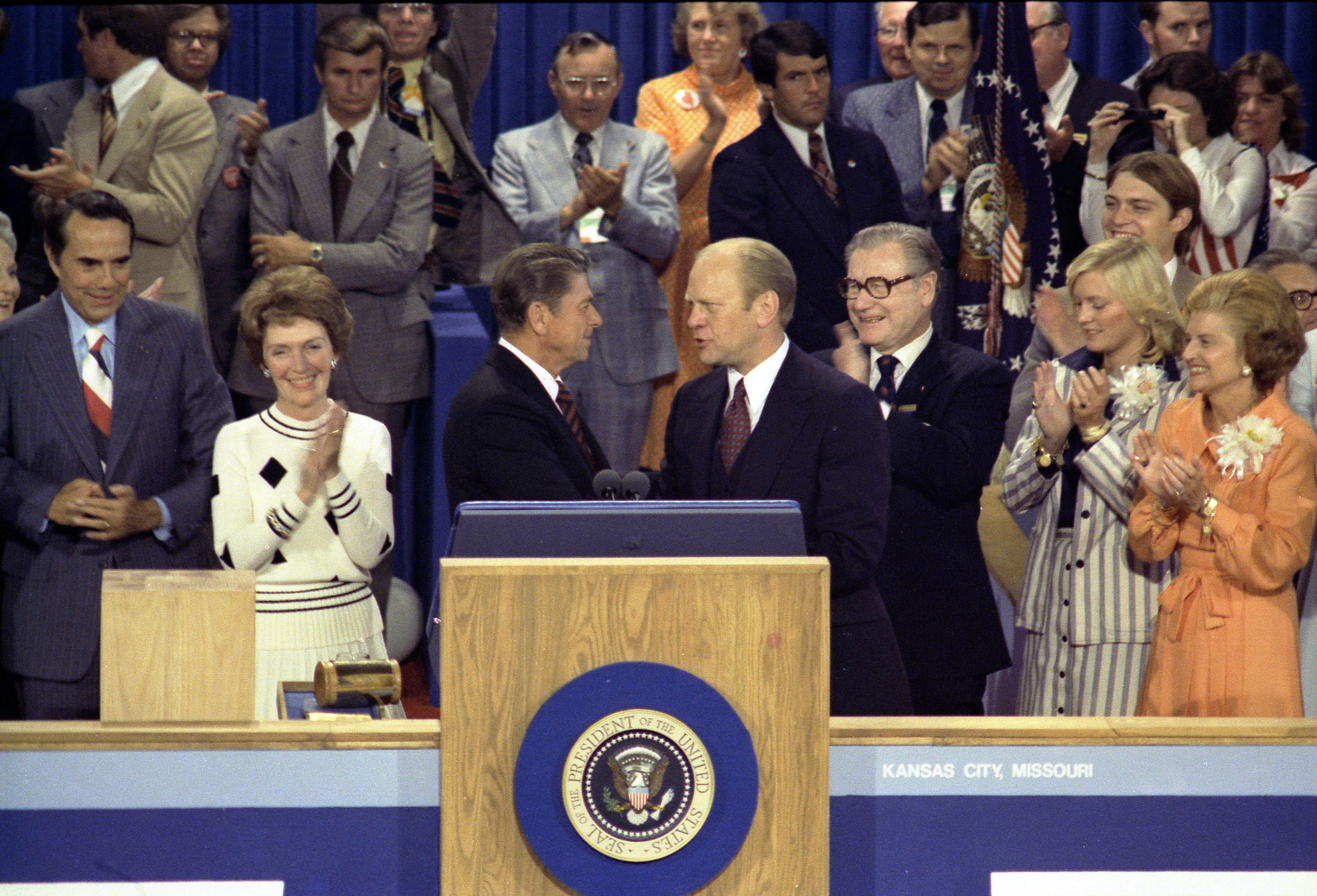
Rockefeller (front row, 5th from left) at the 1976 Republican National Convention along with (left to right) Robert Dole, Nancy Reagan, Ronald Reagan, President Gerald Ford, Susan Ford and Betty Ford.

Humphrey revealed in 1976 that he tried to convince Rockefeller to be his running mate in the Democratic Party ticket in 1968 but the latter refused to switch parties.

== Vice presidency (1974–1977) ==
Upon President Nixon's resignation on August 9, 1974, Vice President Gerald Ford assumed the presidency. On August 20, Ford nominated Rockefeller to be the next vice president of the United States. In considering potential nominees, Rockefeller was one of three primary candidates. The other two were Donald Rumsfeld, the then-United States Ambassador to NATO whom Ford eventually chose as his chief of staff and later secretary of defense, and then-Republican National Committee chairman George H. W. Bush, who would eventually become vice president in his own right for two terms and president for one term.

While acknowledging that many conservatives opposed Rockefeller, Ford believed he would bring executive expertise to the administration and broaden the ticket's appeal if they ran in 1976, given Rockefeller's ability to attract support from constituencies that did not typically support Republicans, including organized labor, African Americans, Hispanics, and city dwellers. Ford also felt he could demonstrate his own self-confidence by selecting a strong personality like Rockefeller for the number two spot. Although he had said he was "just not built for standby equipment", Rockefeller was persuaded by Ford's promise to make him "a full partner" in his presidency, especially in domestic policy. Rockefeller accepted the President's request to serve as vice president. He said: "It was entirely a question of there being a Constitutional crisis and a crisis of confidence on the part of the American people. I felt there was a duty incumbent on any American who could do anything that would contribute to a restoration of confidence in the democratic process and in the integrity of government."

Rockefeller underwent extended hearings before Congress, suffering embarrassment when it was revealed he made massive gifts to senior aides, such as Henry Kissinger, and used his personal fortune to finance a scurrilous biography of political opponent Arthur Goldberg. He had also taken debatable deductions on his federal income taxes, and ultimately agreed to pay nearly one million dollars to settle the issue but no illegalities were uncovered, and he was confirmed. Although conservative Republicans were not pleased that Rockefeller was picked, most of them voted for his confirmation anyway; nevertheless, a minority bloc (including Barry Goldwater, Jesse Helms, and Trent Lott) voted against him. Many conservative groups campaigned against Rockefeller's nomination, including the National Right to Life Committee, the American Conservative Union, and others. The New York Conservative Party also opposed his confirmation, despite the fact that James L. Buckley, its only elected member of Congress then, supported him. On the American Left, the likes of Americans for Democratic Action opposed Rockefeller's confirmation because it said his wealth posed too much of a conflict of interest.

The U.S. Senate had given its approval December 10, 1974, 90 to 7. The U.S. House confirmed his nomination 287 to 128 on December 19, 1974. Beginning his service upon taking the oath of office on December 19, 1974, Rockefeller was the second person appointed vice president under the 25th Amendment—the first being Ford himself. He is also the only private citizen to become Vice President without having campaigned for, or elected to the office. Rockefeller often seemed concerned that Ford gave him little or no power, and few tasks while he was vice president. Ford initially said he wanted Rockefeller to chair the U.S. Domestic Policy Council but Ford's new White House staff had no intention of sharing power with the vice president and his staff.

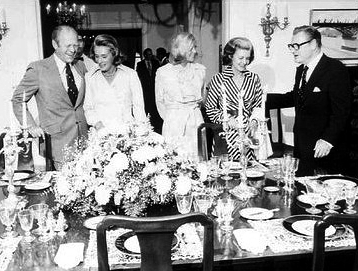
Vice President Rockefeller (right) and his wife Happy (second on left) entertain President Gerald Ford (left) his wife Betty (second on right) and their daughter Susan (center) at Number One Observatory Circle on September 7, 1975.

Rockefeller's attempt to take charge of domestic policy was thwarted by Chief of Staff Rumsfeld, who objected to policy makers reporting to the president through the vice president. When Rockefeller had one of his former aides, James Cannon, appointed executive director of the Domestic Council, Rumsfeld cut its budget. Rockefeller was excluded from the decision-making process on many important issues. When he learned that Ford had proposed cuts in federal taxes and spending, he responded: "This is the most important move the president has made, and I wasn't even consulted."

Rockefeller's time as vice president was marked by his strong support for the Vietnam War, a position that aligned him with the military-industrial complex. Even as public sentiment turned against the conflict, Rockefeller remained a proponent of continued U.S. military involvement. His unwavering stance on Vietnam reflected his broader connection to elite circles, which were exposed by the Pentagon Papers. These documents revealed how high-ranking officials, like Rockefeller, were complicit in the escalation of the war for strategic and economic reasons, downplaying the costs to both the American people and the Vietnamese population. Rockefeller's ties to military contractors and his defense of war policies further underscored his alignment with the defense industry, which benefitted from prolonged military engagement.

Ford appointed him to the Commission on the Organization of Government for the Conduct of Foreign Policy, and appointed him chairman of the Commission on CIA Activities within the United States, the National Commission on Productivity, the Federal Compensation Committee, and the Committee on the Right to Privacy. While Rockefeller was vice president, the official vice-presidential residence was established at Number One Observatory Circle on the grounds of the U.S. Naval Observatory. This residence had previously been the residence of the Chief of Naval Operations. Previous vice presidents had been responsible for maintaining their own homes at their own expense but the necessity of full-time U.S. Secret Service security had made this custom impractical. Rockefeller already had a well-secured Washington residence and never lived in the home as a principal residence. Rockefeller was slow to make use of Air Force Two, the official vice-presidential aircraft. Instead, he continued to use his own Gulfstream, which had the callsign Executive Two as a private aircraft. Rockefeller felt he was saving taxpayer money this way. Finally, the Secret Service convinced him it was costing more to fly agents around separately for his protective detail than it would for him to travel on Air Force Two with them.

=== 1976 presidential election ===
With the moderate Ford facing continued difficulty in securing the support of conservative Republicans for the 1976 Republican Party presidential primaries and anticipating a challenge from the conservative Ronald Reagan, he considered the possibility of another running mate, and discussed it with Rockefeller. In November 1975, Rockefeller offered to withdraw. Ford eventually concurred. In explaining his decision, Rockefeller said that he "didn't come down [to Washington] to get caught up in party squabbles which only make it more difficult for the President in a very difficult time". After Ford was nominated at the 1976 Republican National Convention, Reagan, Goldwater, and other prominent conservatives conditioned their support for Ford on his selection of a suitable vice-presidential nominee. Ford selected Kansas Senator Bob Dole instead. Ford is the most recent incumbent president to not choose his incumbent vice president as his running mate. Ford later said not choosing Rockefeller was one of his biggest mistakes, and "one of the few cowardly things I did in my life".

Rockefeller campaigned actively for the Republican ticket in the 1976 United States presidential election, which was won by Jimmy Carter. In what would become an iconic photo of the 1976 campaign, Rockefeller appeared to be responding to hecklers at a rally in Binghamton, New York, with a raised middle finger. Rockefeller's former right-hand man Malcolm Wilson told reporter Richard Zander that Rockefeller "just got his fingers mixed up" while signaling somebody. While political observers scoffed at that explanation, it may have been true; Rockefeller had dyslexia and was known to favor his middle finger, signing his signature with a pen held between his index and middle fingers. When Rockefeller's camp saw that the obscene gesture story was popular to many Republicans, they stopped denying that that had been his intent. At that time, Rockefeller's finger flashing was considered scandalous. Writing about the moment 20 years later, Michael Oricchio of the San Jose Mercury News said the action became known euphemistically as "the Rockefeller gesture".

== Political ideology ==
Reflecting his interdisciplinary approach to problem solving, Rockefeller took a pragmatic approach to governing. In their book Rockefeller of New York: Executive Power in the State House, Robert Connery and Gerald Benjamin state that "Rockefeller was not committed to any ideology. Rather, he considered himself a practical problem solver, much more interested in defining problems and finding solutions around which he could unite support sufficient to ensure their enactment in legislation than in following either a strictly liberal or strictly conservative course. Rockefeller's programs did not consistently follow either liberal or conservative ideology." According to Connery and Benjamin, early fiscal policies were conservative while later ones were not so. In the later years of his administration, "conservative decisions on social programs were paralleled by liberal ones on environmental issues."

Rockefeller was opposed by conservatives in the Republican Party, such as Barry Goldwater and Ronald Reagan, because of his liberal political views. Described as a big spender by historian Geoffrey Kabaservice, Rockefeller spent more money as governor of New York than his Republican predecessor Thomas E. Dewey, a moderate Republican who was more fiscally conservative. Rockefeller expanded the state's infrastructure, increased spending on education including a massive expansion of the State University of New York, and increased the state's involvement in environmental issues. In foreign affairs, Rockefeller supported American involvement in the United Nations, as well as United States foreign aid. He also supported the fight against communism and its membership in NATO. As a result of Rockefeller's policies, some conservatives sought to gain leverage by creating the Conservative Party of New York. The small party acted as a minor counterweight to the Liberal Party of New York.

The most common criticism of Rockefeller's governorship of New York is that he attempted to do too much too quickly, significantly increasing the state's debt level, which later contributed to New York's fiscal crisis in 1975. Rockefeller created some 230 public-benefit authorities like the Urban Development Corporation. They were often used to issue bonds in order to avoid the requirement of a vote of the people for the issuance of a bond; such authority-issued bonds bore higher interest than if they had been issued directly by the state. The state budget went from $2.04 billion in 1959–1960 to $8.8 billion in his last year, 1973–1974. In the words of Connery and Benjamin, "Rockefeller sought and obtained eight tax increases during his fifteen years in office." Connery and Benjamin further argued that "during his administration, the tax burden rose to a higher level than in any other state, and the incidence of taxation shifted, with a greater share being borne by the individual taxpayer."

== Philanthropy and art patronage ==
Rockefeller served as chairman of Rockefeller Center, Inc., from 1945 to 1953 and 1956 to 1958, and began a program of physical expansion there. In 1940, he and his four brothers established the Rockefeller Brothers Fund, a philanthropy; he served as a trustee from 1940 to 1975 and 1977 to 1979, and as president in 1956. He established the American International Association for Economic and Social Development (AIA) in 1946. AIA was a philanthropy for the dissemination of technical and managerial expertise and equipment to underdeveloped countries to support grass-roots efforts in overcoming illiteracy, disease and poverty.

Rockefeller served as a trustee of the Museum of Modern Art from 1932 to 1979. He also served as treasurer from 1935 from 1939 and president from 1939 to 1941 and 1946 and 1953. In 1933 Rockefeller was a member of the committee selecting art for the new Rockefeller Center. For the wall opposite the main entrance of 30 Rockefeller Plaza Nelson Rockefeller wanted Henri Matisse or Pablo Picasso to paint a mural because he favored their modern style but neither was available. Diego Rivera was one of Rockefeller's mother's favorite artists and therefore was commissioned to create the huge mural. He was given the theme of New Frontiers. Rockefeller wanted the painting to make people pause and think. Rivera submitted a sketch for a mural entitled Man at the Crossroads Looking with Hope and High Vision to the Choosing of a New and Better Future. The sketch featured an anonymous man at the center; however, when it was painted, the work caused great controversy due to the inclusion of a painting of Vladimir Lenin (depicting communism) just off-center. The directors of Rockefeller Center objected and Rockefeller asked Rivera to change the face of Lenin to that of an unknown laborer's face as was originally intended but the painter refused. The work was paid for on May 22, 1933, and immediately draped. Rockefeller suggested that the fresco could be donated to the Museum of Modern Art, but the trustees of the museum were not interested. People protested but it remained covered until the early weeks of 1934, when it was smashed by workers and hauled away in wheelbarrows. Rivera responded by saying that it was "cultural vandalism". At Rockefeller Center in its place is a mural by Jose Maria Sert which includes an image of Abraham Lincoln. The Rockefeller-Rivera dispute is covered in the films Cradle Will Rock and Frida.

Rockefeller was a noted collector of both modern and non-Western art. During his governorship, the state of New York acquired major works of art for the new Empire State Plaza in Albany. He continued his mother's work at the Museum of Modern Art as president and turned the basement of his Kykuit mansion into a gallery while placing works of sculpture around the grounds (an activity he enjoyed personally supervising, frequently moving the pieces from place to place by helicopter). While he was overseeing construction of the State University of New York system, Rockefeller built, in collaboration with his lifelong friend Roy Neuberger, the Philip Johnson-designed Neuberger Museum on the campus of the State University of New York at Purchase. He commissioned Master Santiago Martínez Delgado to make a canvas mural for the Bank of New York (City Bank) in Bogotá, Colombia; this ended up being the last work of the artist, as he died while finishing it.

Rockefeller's early visits to Mexico kindled a collecting interest in pre-Columbian and contemporary Mexican art, to which he added works of traditional African and Pacific Island art. In 1954, he established the Museum of Primitive Art devoted to the indigenous art of the Americas, Africa, Oceania, and early Asia and Europe. His personal collection formed the core of the collection. In 1956, Frederic Huntington Douglas was named honorary Curator of the American Indian section of the Nelson Rockefeller Museum of Native Arts in New York. The museum opened to the public in 1957 in a townhouse at 15 West 54th Street in New York City. In 1969, he gave the museum's collection to the Metropolitan Museum of Art where it became the Michael C. Rockefeller Collection.

In 1977, Rockefeller founded Nelson Rockefeller Collection, Inc., (NRC) an art reproduction company that produced and sold licensed reproductions of selected works from Rockefeller's collection. In the introduction to the NRC catalog, he stated he was motivated by his desire to share with others "the joy of living with these beautiful objects". In 1978, Alfred A. Knopf published a book on primitive art from Rockefeller's collection. Rockefeller, impressed with the work of photographer Lee Boltin and editor/publisher Paul Anbinder on the book, co-founded Nelson Rockefeller Publications, Inc. with them, with the goal of publishing fine art books of high quality. After Rockefeller's death less than a year later, the company continued as Hudson Hills Press, Inc.

== Personal life ==
On June 23, 1930, Rockefeller married Mary Todhunter Clark, a daughter of Percy Hamilton Clark, a noted cricketer, and Elizabeth Williams Clark (née Roberts), of Germantown, Philadelphia. They had five children:

- Rodman Clark Rockefeller (1932–2000), businessman and philanthropist, wed firstly to Barbara Ann Olsen, with whom he had four children. He was secondly married to Alexandra (Sascha) von Metzler.
- Ann Rockefeller Roberts (1934–2024), author and founder/president of Fund of the Four Directions (a private fund with focus on indigenous people), married firstly to Robert Laughlin Pierson, a clergyman in Newark, New Jersey, from 1952 to 1966, three children. She sought divorce in Juarez, Mexico. She would then secondly marry and divorce Lionel R. Coste Jr., an architect. In 1979, she married thirdly to T. George Harris, of Princeton, New Jersey. She continued to use the maiden name of her maternal grandmother Elizabeth Roberts Clark.
- Steven Clark Rockefeller (born 1936), a professor and philanthropist, married three times, four children including Steven Clark Rockefeller Jr.
- Mary Rockefeller (born 1938), twin of Michael, married firstly to William J. Strawbridge Jr., with whom she had three children. In 1974, she married secondly to Thomas B. Morgan, press secretary to former Mayor John Lindsay. She is a psychotherapist and author based in Manhattan, New York.
- Michael Clark Rockefeller (1938–1961), twin of Mary, who disappeared in New Guinea in November 1961. He is presumed to have drowned while trying to swim to shore after his dugout canoe capsized.

Nelson and Mary Rockefeller were divorced in 1962. On May 4, 1963, Rockefeller married Margaretta Large "Happy" Fitler. She was a daughter of William Wonderly Fitler Jr. and Margaretta Large Fitler (née Harrison). They had two sons together:

- Nelson Aldrich Rockefeller Jr. (born 1964), a serial businessman, alumnus of Dartmouth College, married to Amy K. Taylor. They have a son and a daughter. They were residents of Manhattan and Montclair, New Jersey before moving to Larchmont, New York.
- Mark Fitler Rockefeller (born 1967), a businessman, financier and gentleman farmer, married to and divorced from Renee Anne Anisko (born 1968). He served as chairman of Historic Hudson Valley. They jointly own South Fork Lodge, a fishing resort on Snake River, Idaho. They have three children.

With Mary Rockefeller, Rockefeller had lived at the three top floors at 810 Fifth Avenue. After their divorce and Rockefeller's second marriage, Mary Rockefeller kept the two top floors of the triplex apartment. The apartment was expanded via the purchase of one floor of 812 Fifth Avenue. The two spaces were connected via a flight of six steps. Nelson and Happy Rockefeller used the entrance at 812 Fifth, while Mary Rockefeller entered through 810 Fifth. Nelson and Happy Rockefeller remained married until Rockefeller's death.

Rockefeller engaged in numerous extramarital affairs during his marriages. Mary Rockefeller resented his adultery, which was one of the main reasons for their divorce. Rockefeller convinced Mary early in the marriage that they should live separate lives, but remain married for the sake of public appearances and the children. There was speculation surrounding the paternity of Malinda Fitler Murphy (born 1960), the youngest daughter of Happy Rockefeller and James Slater Murphy; many in the Rockefeller inner circle believed her to be Rockefeller's daughter. In his diary, Rockefeller intimate Ken Riland used a tone of knowing irony when mentioning Malinda, putting the word stepfather in quotes. Rockefeller was also a patient of famous psychic Edgar Cayce.

== Death ==
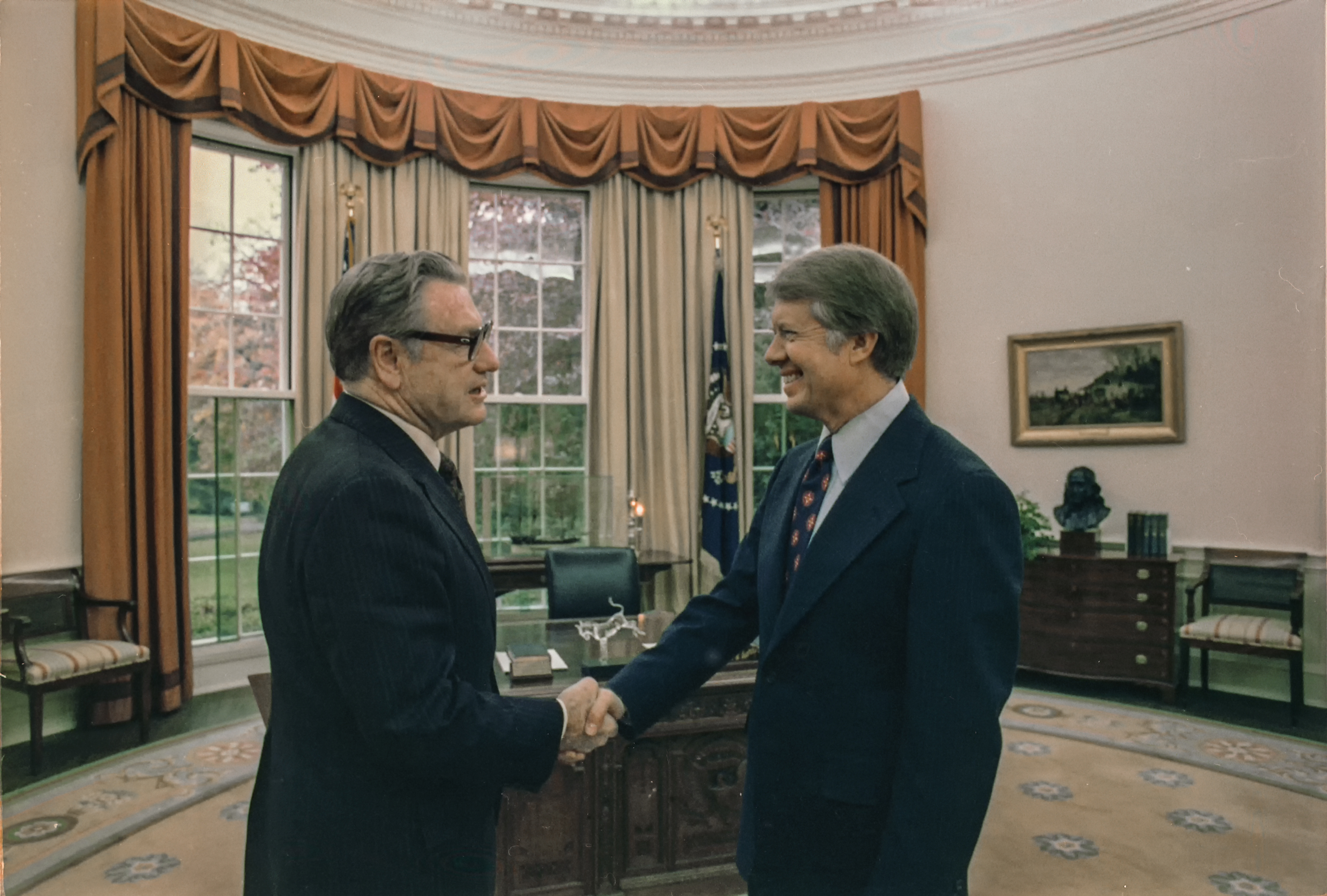
Rockefeller and President Jimmy Carter in October 1977

Rockefeller died on January 26, 1979 from complications of a heart attack. His death occurred two years and six days after his vice presidential tenure ended. He was 70 years old.

An initial report incorrectly stated that he died at his desk in his office at Rockefeller Center. The report was soon corrected to state that Rockefeller actually had the fatal heart attack at another location, a townhouse he owned at 13 West 54th Street. The heart attack occurred in the late evening in the presence of Megan Marshack, a 25-year-old aide. After Rockefeller suffered the heart attack, Marshack called her friend, news reporter Ponchitta Pierce, to the townhouse; Pierce phoned an ambulance approximately an hour after the heart attack.

Rockefeller's remains were cremated at Ferncliff Cemetery in nearby Hartsdale, New York. On January 29, 1979, family and close friends gathered to inter his ashes in the private Rockefeller family cemetery at the family estate in Pocantico Hills, New York. A memorial service was held at Riverside Church in Upper Manhattan on February 2; the service was attended by 2,200 people. Attendees included President Jimmy Carter and former Secretary of State Henry Kissinger.

=== Megan Marshack ===
The circumstances of Rockefeller's death led to widespread speculation regarding a possible adulterous relationship between Rockefeller and Megan Marshack. Marshack had worked for Rockefeller when he served as vice president, had relocated to New York, had continued to work for Rockefeller after his term as vice president ended, and had received financial assistance from Rockefeller in purchasing and furnishing a condominium several doors down from his Manhattan townhouse. In a Public Broadcasting Service (PBS) documentary about the Rockefeller family, longtime Rockefeller aide Joseph E. Persico said: "It became known that [Rockefeller] had been alone with a young woman who worked for him, in undeniably intimate circumstances, and in the course of that evening had died from a heart attack." Rockefeller's four oldest children issued a statement saying that they had conducted their own review, that they believed their father could not have been saved, and that all those who tried to help had acted responsibly. The family would not consent to an autopsy.

In 2017, the New York Daily News stated that following Rockefeller's death, "it wasn't long before Johnny Carson could start drawing laughs merely by uttering the words 'Megan Marshack'."

== Legacy ==
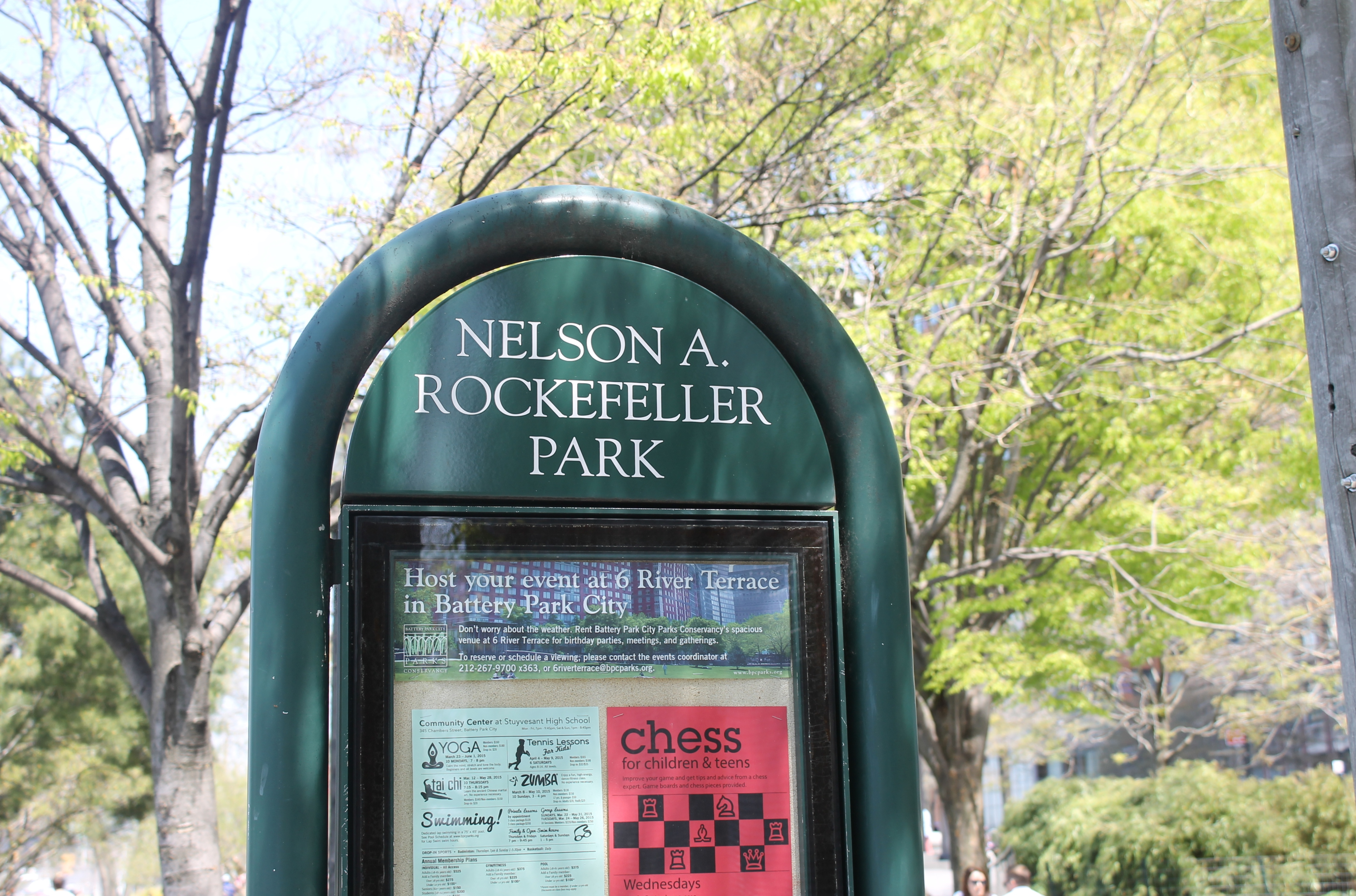
Nelson A. Rockefeller Park is an enclave within Battery Park City in New York City.

The following institutions and facilities have been named in honor of Nelson A. Rockefeller:

- The Nelson A. Rockefeller Center for Public Policy and the Social Sciences, Dartmouth College, a social science research center.
- The Nelson A. Rockefeller Collegiate Center, Binghamton University, New York.
- The Governor Nelson A. Rockefeller Empire State Plaza.
- Nelson A. Rockefeller Park, Battery Park City, New York City.

== See also ==
- 30 Rockefeller Plaza (Room 5600 – The Rockefeller Family Office)
- Electoral history of Nelson Rockefeller
- Wallace Harrison

Government offices
New office	Assistant Secretary of State for American Republic Affairs; 1944–1945	Succeeded by Spruille Braden
Party political offices
Preceded by Irving Ives	Republican nominee for Governor of New York; 1958, 1962, 1966, 1970	Succeeded by Malcolm Wilson
Political offices
New office	Under Secretary of Health, Education, and Welfare; 1953–1954	Succeeded by Herold C. Hunt
Preceded by W. Averell Harriman	Governor of New York; 1959–1973	Succeeded by Malcolm Wilson
Preceded by Gerald Ford	Vice President of the United States; 1974–1977	Succeeded by Walter Mondale
