= Megan Marshack =

American journalist (1953–2024)

- Born: Megan Ruth Marshack; October 31, 1953; Los Angeles, California, U.S.
- Died: October 2, 2024 (aged 70); Sacramento, California, U.S.
- Education: California State University, Northridge
- Occupations: Journalist; political aide
- Known for: Association with Nelson Rockefeller
- Spouse: Edmond Jacoby Jr. (m. 2003; died 2023)

Megan Ruth Marshack (October 31, 1953 – October 2, 2024) was an American journalist and producer who served as an aide to Nelson Rockefeller from 1975 until his death on January 26, 1979. She was with Rockefeller when he died, and it was widely alleged that she was his mistress.

== Background ==
Born in Los Angeles on October 31, 1953, Marshack was adopted by Sidney Robert Marshack (1918–1997) and Credwyn (née Patricia) Marshack (1918–2010) of Sherman Oaks, Los Angeles. She graduated from California State University, Northridge, in 1975.

== Career ==
In 1975, Marshack worked briefly as a reporter for the Associated Press. She then joined Rockefeller's staff.

=== Nelson Rockefeller ===
Marshack worked on Rockefeller's vice-presidential staff, in Washington, D.C., for two years, and remained with his team after he left office in 1977 and returned to New York. There had been speculation in the press regarding the nature of the relationship between Marshack and the married Rockefeller.

Marshack was with Rockefeller on the night of his death, and did not phone an ambulance for nearly an hour after his fatal heart attack. Longtime Rockefeller aide Joseph E. Persico claimed in the PBS documentary about the Rockefeller family, "It became known that he had been alone with a young woman who worked for him, in undeniably intimate circumstances, and in the course of that evening had died from a heart attack." Initial reports of Rockefeller's death stated that the former vice president had died in his office; these were later amended to say that his death occurred at a townhouse he owned. It has also been reported that he may have died at Marshack's apartment.

News organizations widely reported that Marshack was a named beneficiary in Rockefeller's will, which specified that personal loans he had made to Marshack totalling $45,000 were to be forgiven. The bulk of his estate was left to his wife, Margaretta L. "Happy" Rockefeller, with other large gifts going to museums.

=== Later career ===
Marshack remained largely out of the public eye afterward, and never commented on Nelson Rockefeller; the Rockefellers were reported to have had her sign a non-disclosure agreement. For about a year after Rockefeller died, she dated 68-year-old cartoonist Charles Addams, who lived in the same apartment building as she did. In the 1980s, she began working for CBS.

In 1992, it was reported that Marshack was still living in New York, working as a news writer for WCBS-TV, but The Washington Post noted she declined to comment, saying "I don't do interviews." She remained with WCBS until around 1998, when she moved to Placerville, California, and joined the staff of the Placerville Mountain Democrat newspaper. In 2003, she married fellow journalist Edmond Jacoby, Jr.

== Later life and death ==
Marshack moved to Sacramento, California, in 2022, so she could live closer to her brother. The following year, Jacoby died from complications of injuries sustained in a car accident.

Marshack died from liver and kidney failure at a care facility in Sacramento, on October 2, 2024, at the age of 70. She authored her own obituary, which was published by a local funeral home. The New York Times observed that, while she largely maintained her silence about a relationship with Rockefeller in her writing, she may have made an oblique reference in the final line, in which she quoted the song "What I Did for Love".
