= 1960 Republican Party presidential primaries =

Selection of Republican US presidential candidate

- March 8 to June 7, 1960
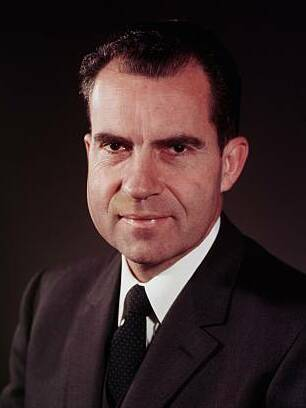

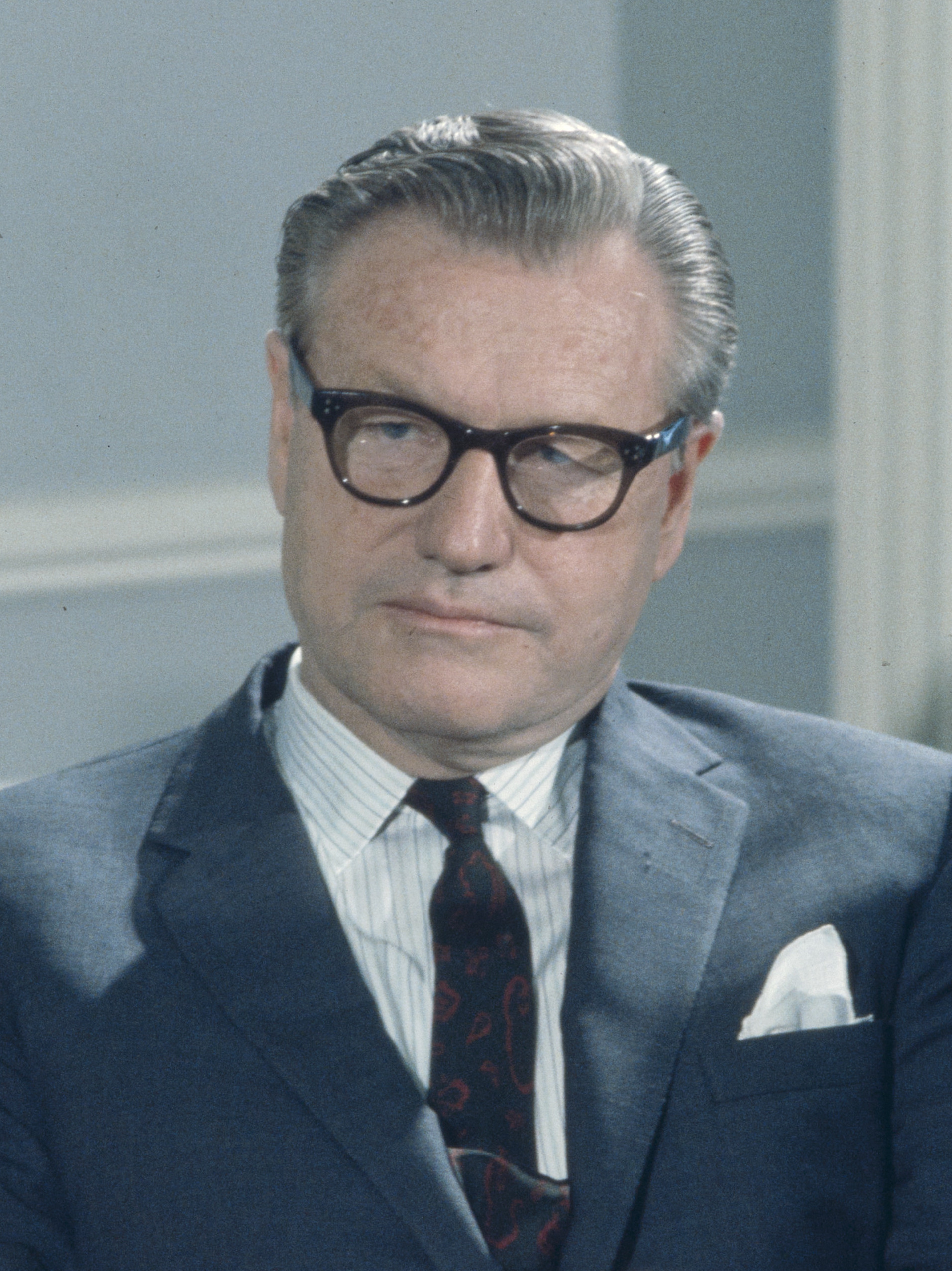
Candidate	Richard Nixon	Nelson Rockefeller
Home state	California	New York
Contests won	11	0
Popular vote	4,975,938	30,639
Percentage	86.6%	0.52%
- Results map by state.
Previous Republican nominee
Dwight D. Eisenhower
Republican nominee
Richard Nixon

From March 8 to June 7, 1960, voters of the Republican Party elected delegates to the 1960 Republican National Convention, in part to choose the party nominee for president in the 1960 United States presidential election.

Incumbent vice president Richard Nixon faced no formidable opposition for the nomination. There were significant efforts by liberals to draft New York governor Nelson Rockefeller as a candidate. Although Rockefeller embarked on a national speaking tour and received some write-in votes in primary elections, he did not declare a campaign for the presidency, and Nixon swept the primaries without difficulty. Rockefeller endorsed Nixon after struggling in the polls and extracting compromises on the party platform.

The 1960 Republican National Convention was held in Chicago, Illinois from July 25 to 28. Nixon was nominated for president and United Nations ambassador Henry Cabot Lodge was nominated for vice president. Nixon and Lodge were defeated in the general election by the Democratic Party ticket of Massachusetts senator John F. Kennedy and Texas senator Lyndon B. Johnson.

== Candidates ==
The following political leaders were candidates for the 1960 Republican presidential nomination:

=== Nominee ===
Candidate	Most recent office	Home state	Campaign Withdrawal date	Popular vote	Contests won	Running mate
Richard Nixon	Vice President of the United States (1953–1961)	California	(Campaign); Secured nomination: July 28, 1960	4,975,938 (86.6%)	11	Henry Cabot Lodge Jr.

=== Other major candidates ===
These candidates participated in multiple state primaries or were included in multiple major national polls.

Candidate	Most recent office	Home state	Campaign Withdrawal date
Nelson Rockefeller	Governor of New York (1959–1973)	New York	(Campaign); Declined draft: December 26, 1959; Revoked declination: June 8, 1960

=== Favorite sons ===
The following candidates ran only in their home state's primary or caucus for the purpose of controlling its delegate slate at the convention and did not appear to be considered national candidates by the media.

- Former U.S. senator George H. Bender of Ohio
- State senator James M. Lloyd of South Dakota
- Governor Cecil H. Underwood of West Virginia

=== Declined to run ===
The following persons were listed in two or more major national polls or were the subject of media speculation surrounding their potential candidacy, but declined to actively seek the nomination.

- Senator Barry Goldwater of Arizona
- Secretary Oveta Culp Hobby of Texas
- Ambassador to the United Nations Henry Cabot Lodge Jr. of Massachusetts
- Former President Herbert Hoover of California

== Polling ==
=== National polling ===
Poll source	Publication	Henry Cabot Lodge Jr.	Richard Nixon	Nelson Rockefeller
Gallup	July 1957	6%	48%	–
Gallup	Oct. 1957	7%	48%	–
Gallup	Jan. 1958	4%	64%	–
Gallup	Jan. 1959	6%	56%	27%
Gallup	Mar. 1959	8%	56%	23%
Gallup	Apr. 1959	10%	58%	17%
Gallup	May 1959	6%	63%	20%
Gallup	June 1959	11%	61%	18%
Gallup	July 1959	5%	65%	19%
Gallup	Aug. 1959	4%	68%	18%
Gallup	Oct. 1959	6%	67%	19%
Gallup	Nov. 1959	4%	66%	19%
Gallup	Jan. 1960	6%	84%	–
Gallup	May 1960	2%	75%	13%
Gallup	July 1960	4%	75%	12%

== Statewide contests by winner ==
		Richard M. Nixon	George H. Bender	Cecil Underwood	James M. Lloyd	Nelson Rockefeller	Unpledged
March 8	New Hampshire	89.28%	-	-	-	3.76%	-
April 5	Wisconsin	100%	-	-	-	-	-
April 12	Illinois	99.94%	-	-	-	-	-
April 19	New Jersey	-	-	-	-	-	100%
April 26	Massachusetts	85.96%	-	-	-	6.58%	-
April 26	Pennsylvania	98.15%	-	-	-	1.27%	-
May 1	Washington, D.C.	-	-	-	-	-	100%
May 3	Indiana	95.40%	-	-	-	-	-
May 3	Ohio	70.48%	29.52%	-	-	-	-
May 10	Nebraska	93.82%	0%	0%	0%	2.56%	0%
May 10	West Virginia	-	-	100%	-	-	-
May 20	Oregon	93.06%	-	-	-	4.10%	-
May 24	Florida	100%	-	-	-	-	-
June 7	California	100%	-	-	-	-	-
June 7	South Dakota	-	-	-	100%	-	-

- Italics - Write-In Vote

== Total popular vote results ==
Primaries total popular vote results

- Richard M. Nixon - 4,975,938 (86.63%)
- George H. Bender - 211,090 (3.68%)
- Unpledged - 314,234 (5.47%)
- Cecil Underwood - 123,756 (2.16%)
- James M. Lloyd - 48,461 (0.84%)
- Nelson Rockefeller - 30,639 (0.53%)
- Others - 39,516 (0.69%)

== See also ==
- 1960 Democratic Party presidential primaries
