= Richard Nixon presidential campaign =

Richard Nixon, the 37th President of the United States, ran for president thrice:

- Richard Nixon 1960 presidential campaign, an unsuccessful general election campaign
- Richard Nixon 1968 presidential campaign, a successful election campaign resulting in him being elected the 37th president of the United States
- Richard Nixon 1972 presidential campaign, a successful re-election campaign
