= 1960 Republican Party vice presidential candidate selection =

1960 Republican vice presidential nomination
- July 28, 1960
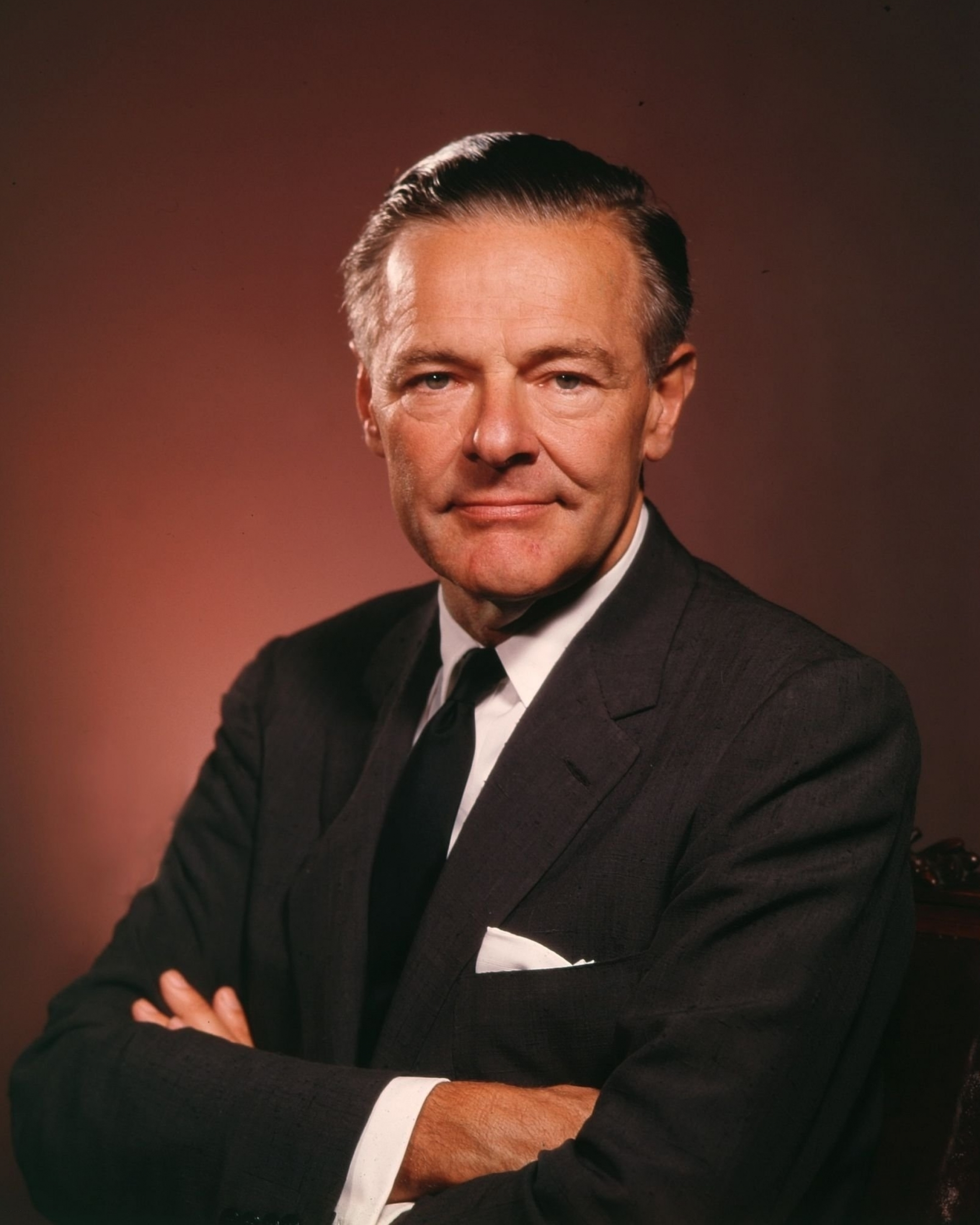
Nominee	Henry Cabot Lodge Jr.
Home state	Massachusetts
Previous Vice Presidential nominee
Richard Nixon
Vice Presidential nominee
Henry Cabot Lodge Jr.

This article lists those who were potential candidates for the Republican nomination for Vice President of the United States in the 1960 election. After winning the Republican presidential nomination at the 1960 Republican National Convention, incumbent Vice President Richard Nixon needed to choose a running mate. President Dwight D. Eisenhower strongly supported UN Ambassador Henry Cabot Lodge Jr. Though Lodge lacked charisma as a campaigner, his foreign policy experience and stature as ambassador made him an appealing candidate. However, Lodge was unpopular with the Republican right, who did not want a Northeastern moderate on the ticket. Nixon also strongly considered conservative Minnesota Representative Walter Judd and moderate Kentucky Senator Thruston Morton. After a closed session with Republican Party leaders, Nixon announced his choice of Lodge. The Republican convention ratified Nixon's choice of Lodge. The Nixon–Lodge ticket lost the 1960 election to the Democratic ticket of Kennedy–Johnson.

== Potential running mates ==
=== Finalists ===
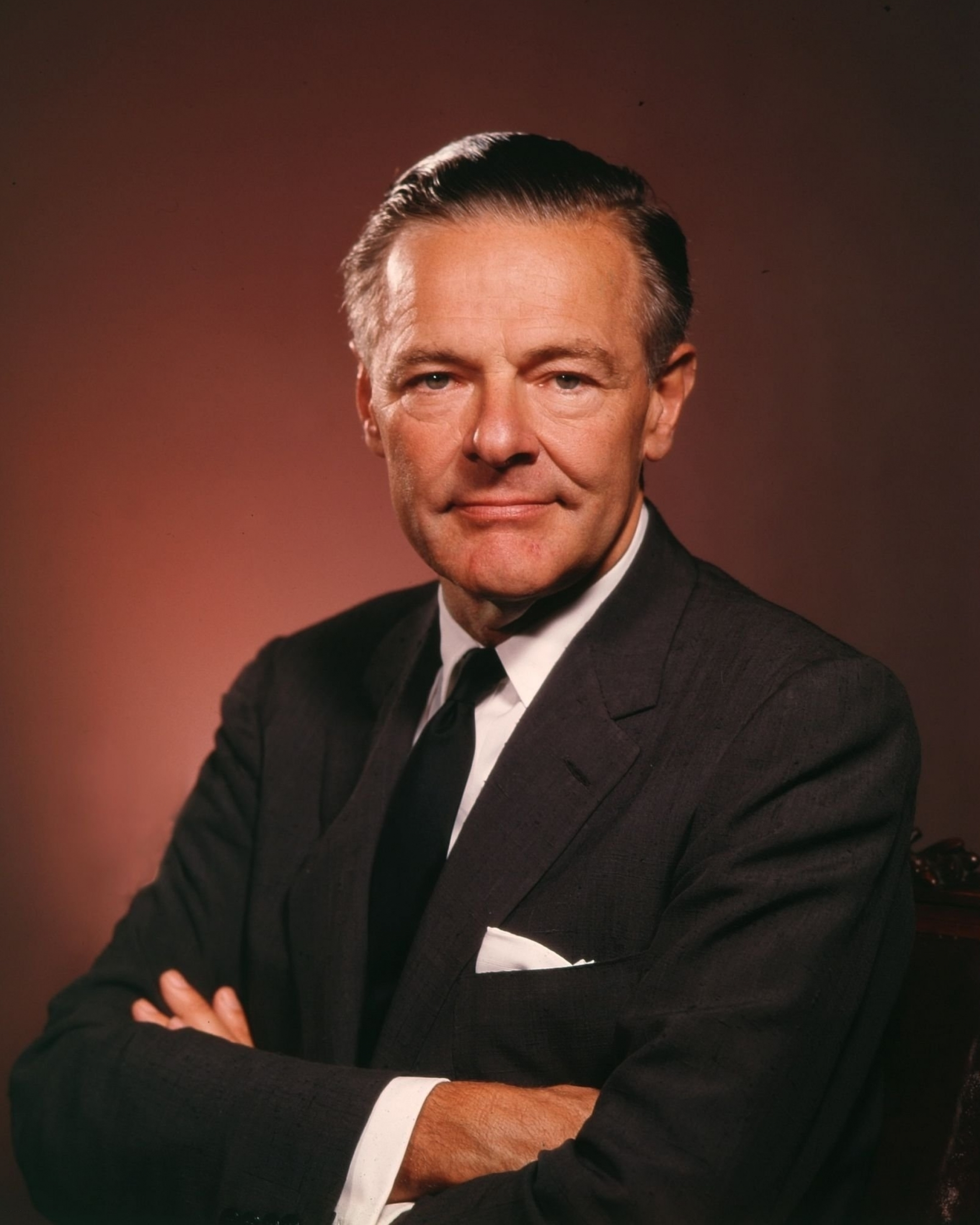
UN Ambassador
Henry Cabot Lodge Jr.
from Massachusetts
(1953–1960)

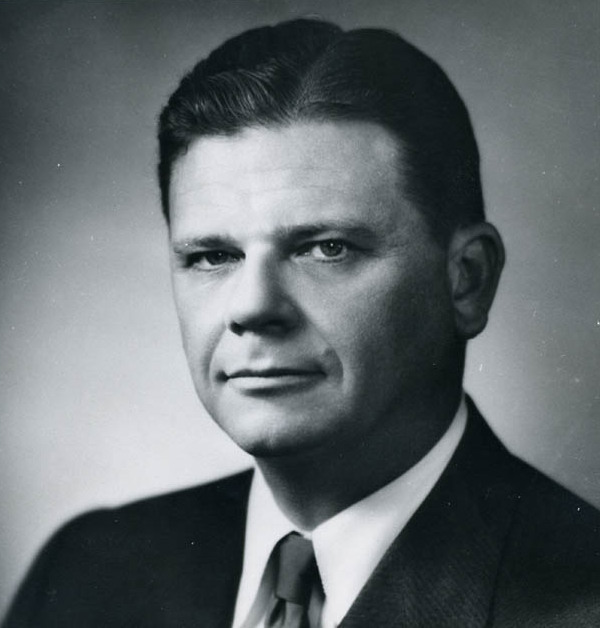
Senator
Thruston Morton
from Kentucky
(1957–1968)

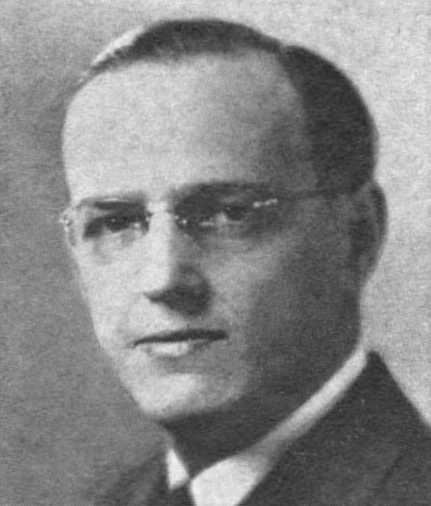
Representative
Walter Judd
from Minnesota
(1943–1963)

=== Others ===
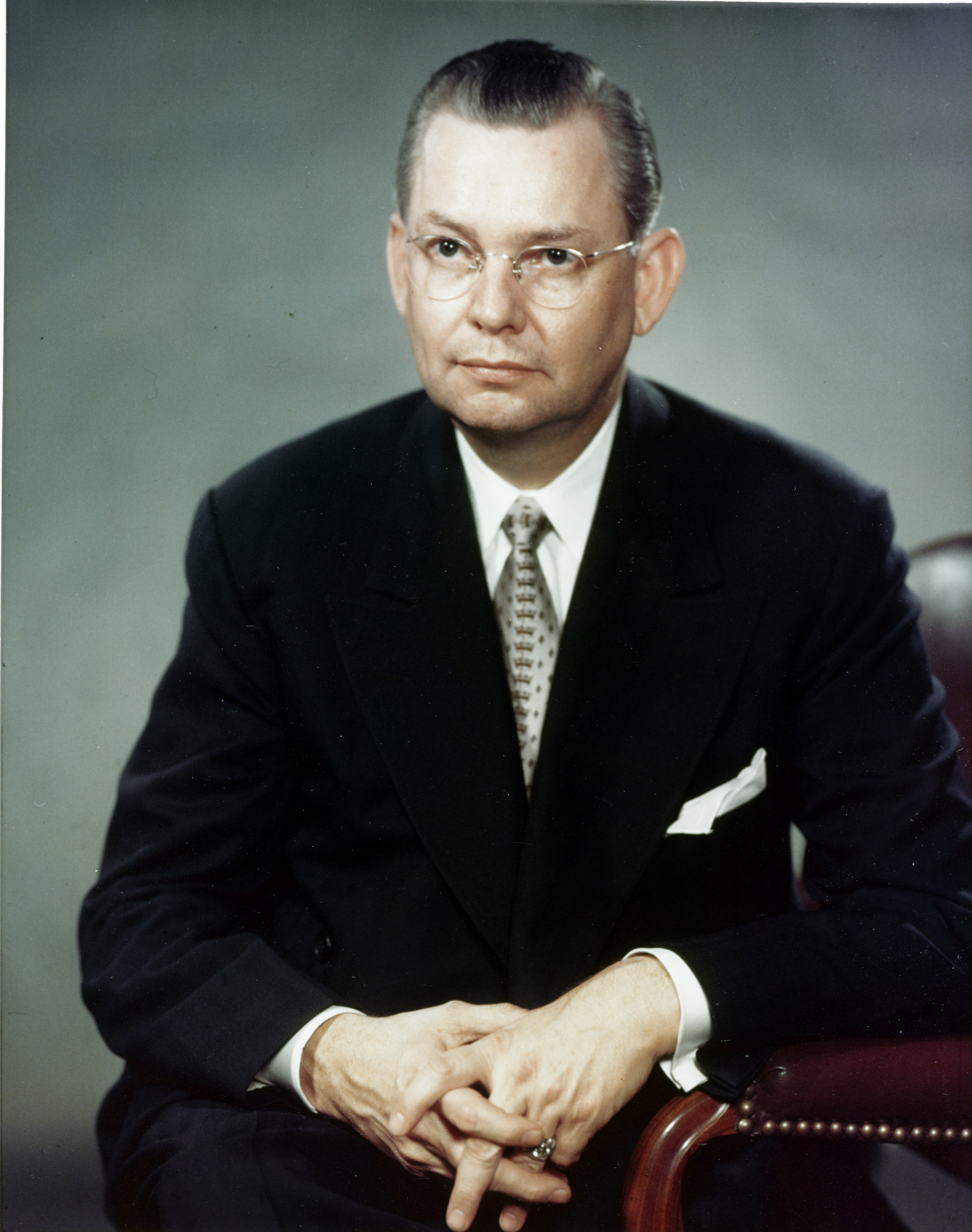
Secretary of the Treasury
Robert B. Anderson
from Texas
(1957–1961)

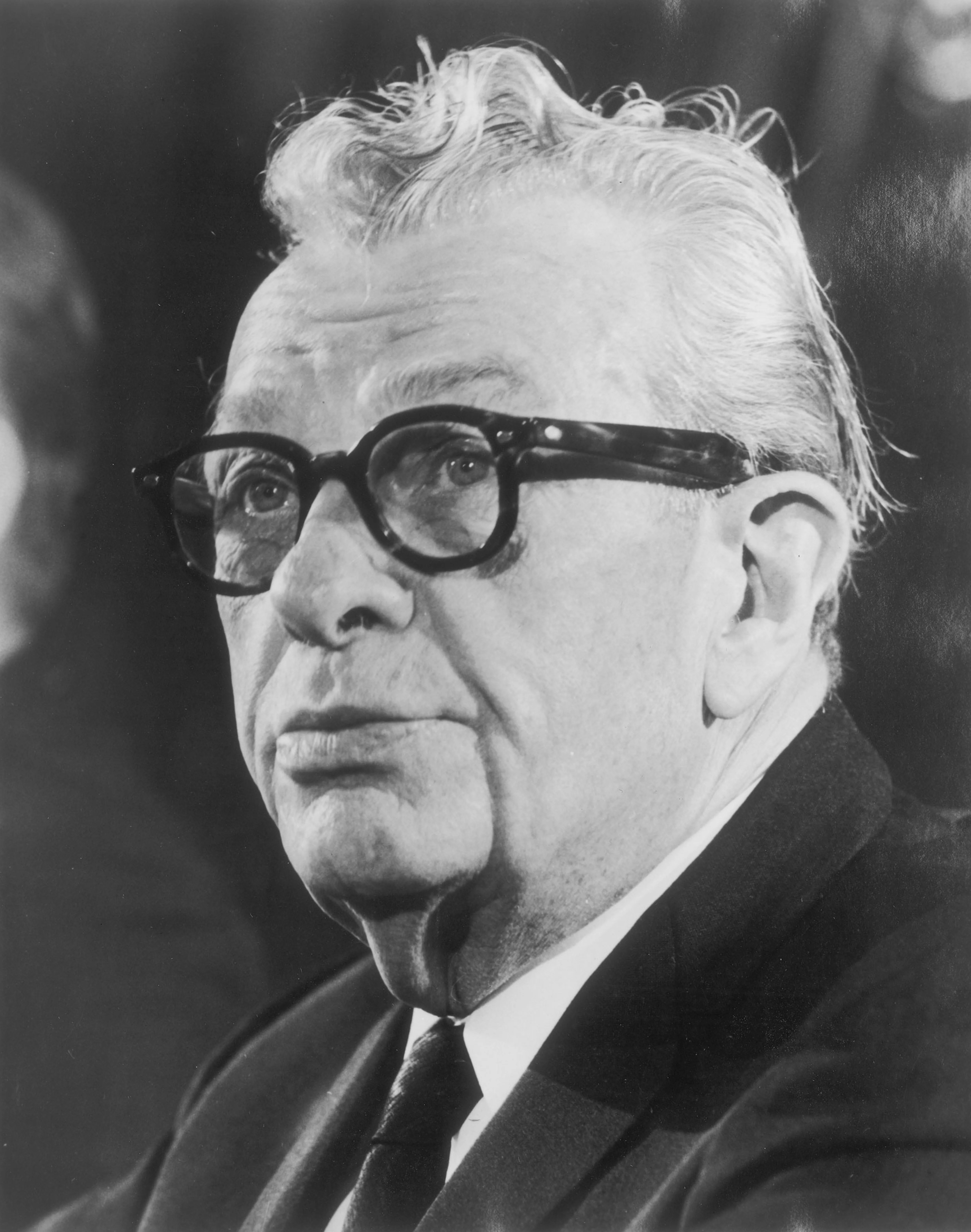
Senator
Everett Dirksen
from Illinois
(1951–1969)

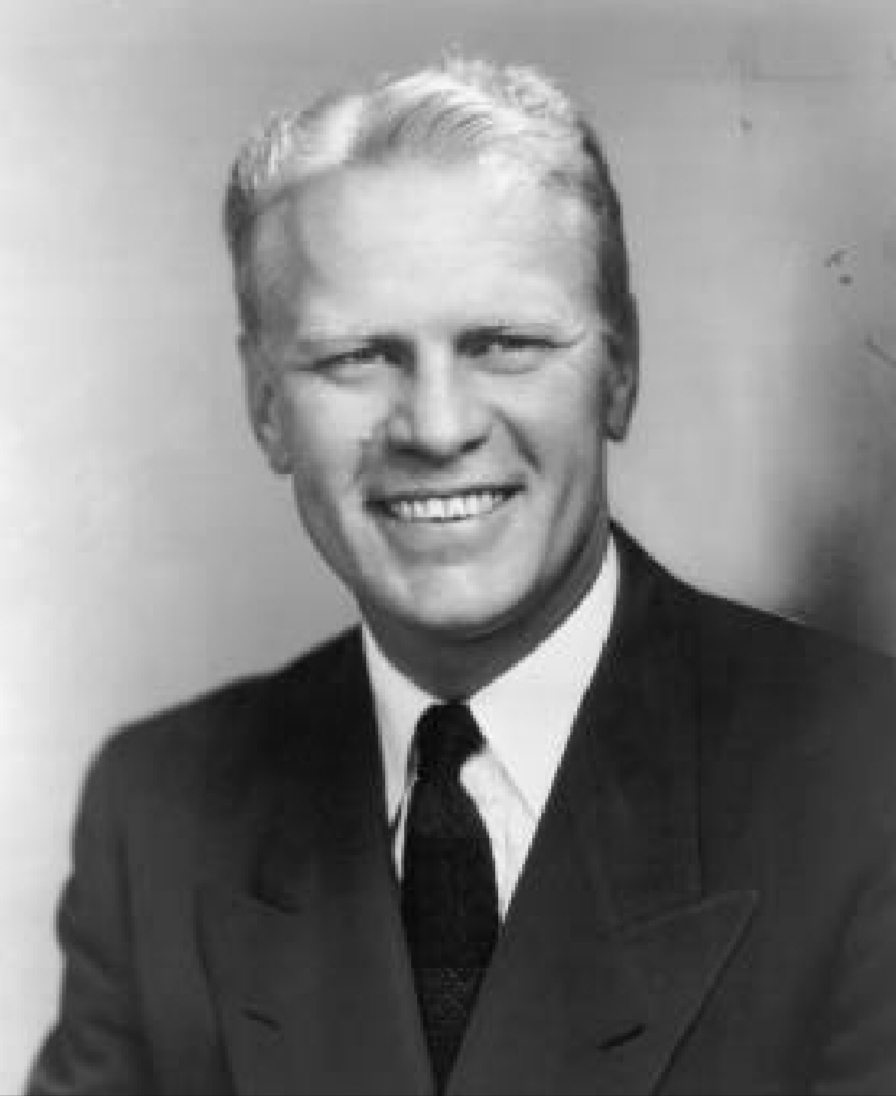
Representative
Gerald Ford
from Michigan
(1949–1973)

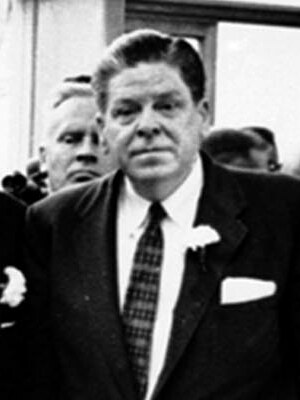
Secretary of Labor
James P. Mitchell
from New Jersey
(1953–1961)

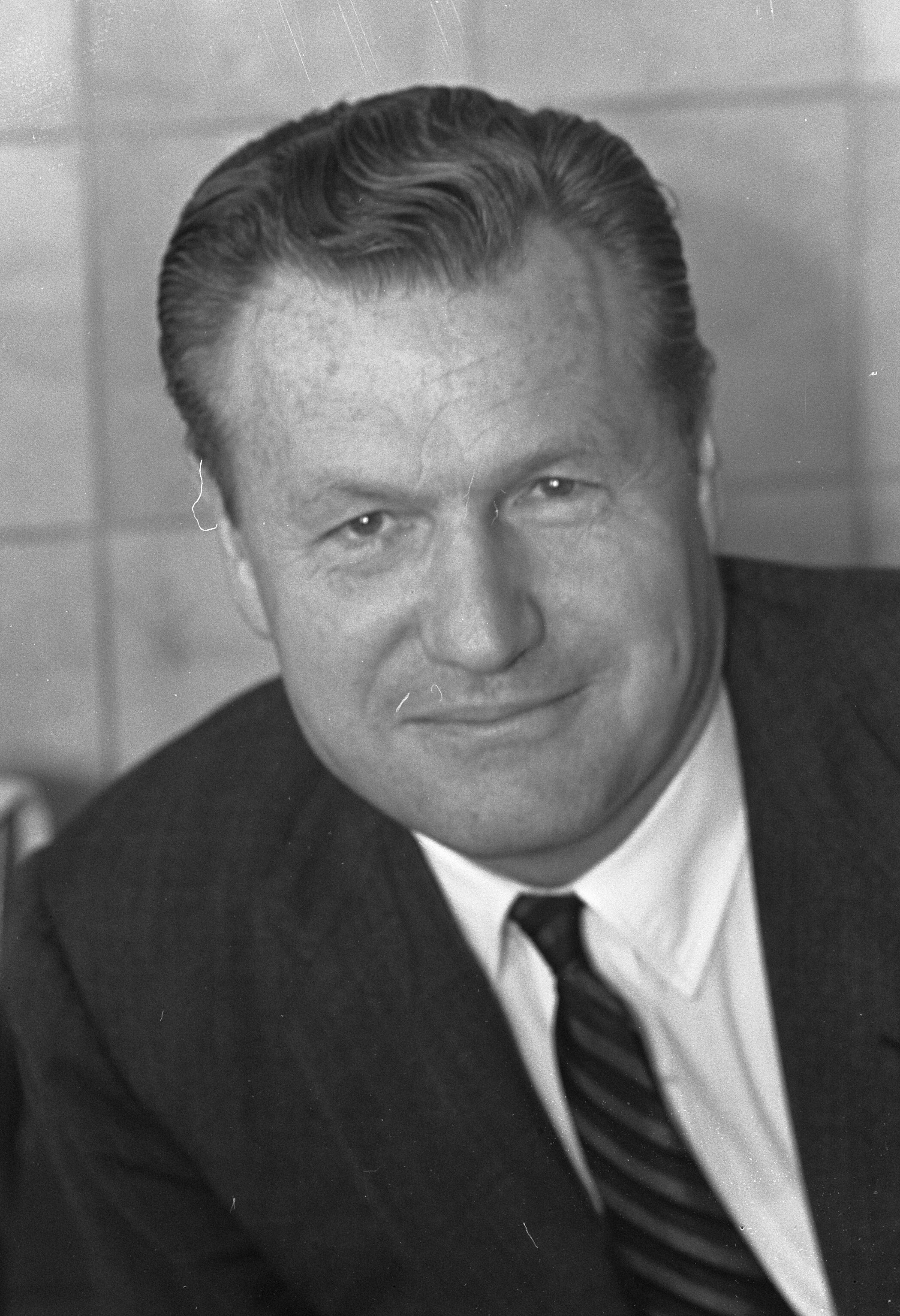
Governor
Nelson Rockefeller
of New York
(1959–1973)

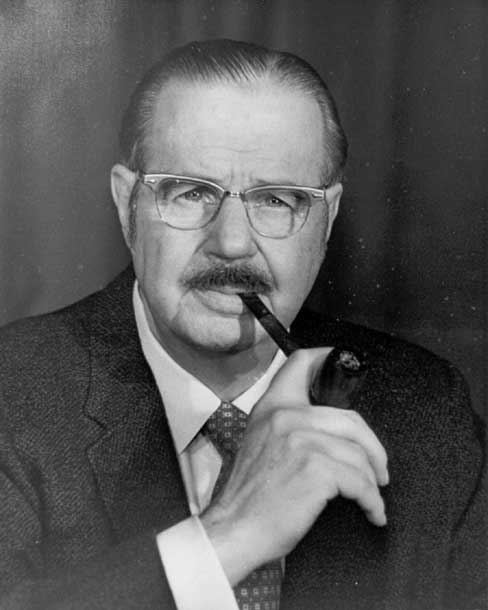
Senator
Hugh Scott
from Pennsylvania
(1959–1977)

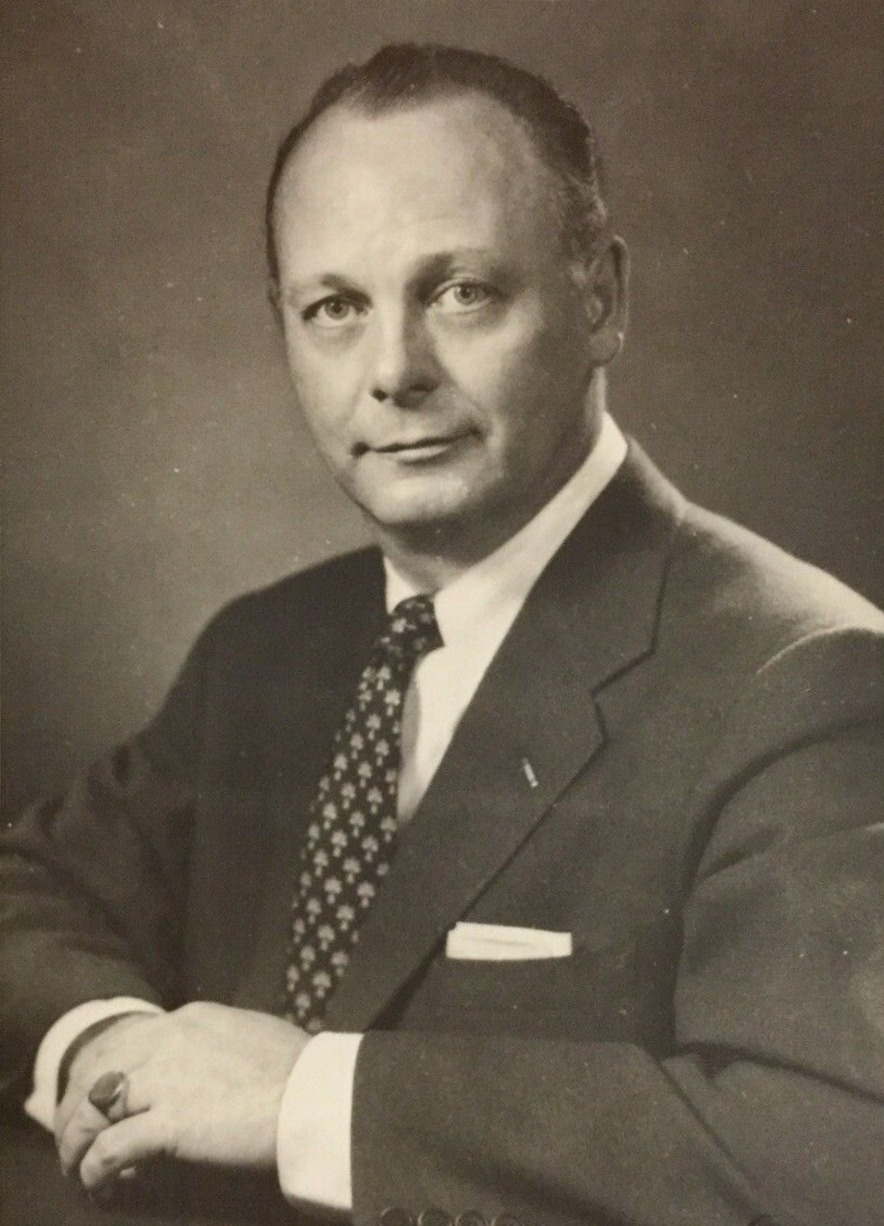
Secretary of the Interior
Fred A. Seaton
from Nebraska
(1956–1961)

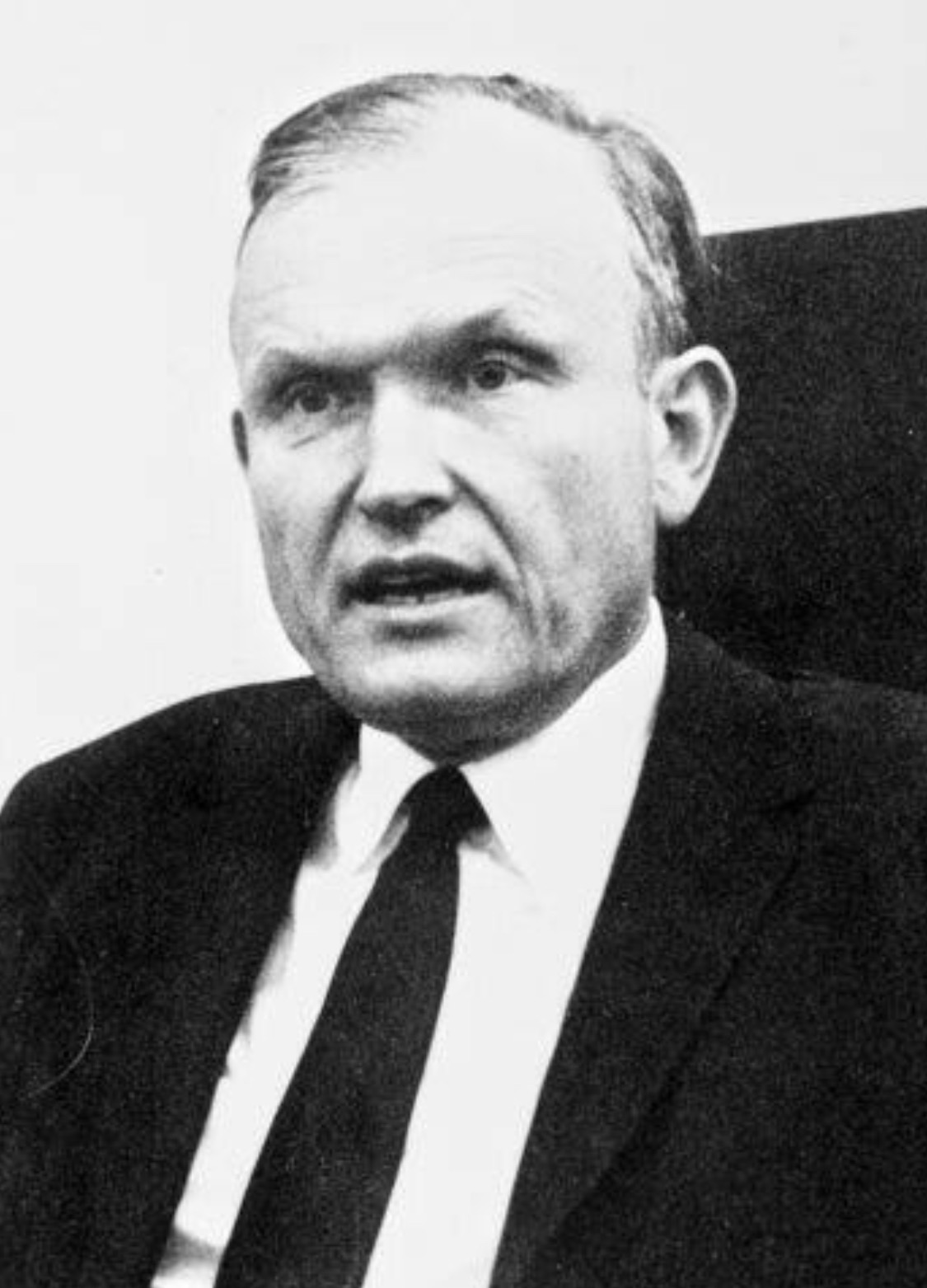
Former State Representative
Philip Willkie
from Indiana
(1948–1954)

Ford would eventually be chosen as vice president by President Nixon in 1973 to replace Spiro Agnew, and Ford would succeed to the presidency when Nixon resigned in 1974. Ford chose Nelson Rockefeller as his vice president in 1974.

== See also ==
- 1960 Republican National Convention
- 1960 Republican Party presidential primaries
