= Richard Nixon 1960 presidential campaign =

American political campaign

Richard Nixon for President 1960
- Campaign: 1960 Republican primaries 1960 U.S. presidential election
- Candidate: Richard Nixon; 36th Vice President of the United States (1953–1961); Henry Cabot Lodge Jr. U.S. Ambassador to the United Nations (1953–1960)
- Affiliation: Republican Party
- Status: Announced: January 9, 1960; Official nominee: July 28, 1960; Lost election: November 8, 1960
- Slogan(s): Experience Counts; Peace, Experience, Prosperity; Nixon-Lodge: They Understand What Peace Demands; America Needs Nixon-Lodge: Side by Side Our Strongest Team
- Theme song: Click with Dick; Buckle Down with Nixon

The 1960 presidential campaign of Richard Nixon, the 36th vice president of the United States, under President Dwight D. Eisenhower, began when he announced he was running for the Republican Party's nomination in the 1960 U.S. presidential election on January 9, 1960. He won the Republican primaries with little opposition and chose as his running mate Henry Cabot Lodge Jr., the United States Ambassador to the United Nations. They faced Democrats John F. Kennedy and running mate Lyndon B. Johnson in the general election. The main issues of the election were the civil rights movement, the Cold War, and Kennedy's Catholic faith. Both candidates were against communism, and were in favor of civil rights enough to win Black voters but not enough to lose white Southerners.

Kennedy won the general election by a slim margin, and Nixon was urged to contest the election results due to irregularities in Illinois and Texas; he declined to do so. Despite having 15 unpledged and faithless electors vote for Harry Byrd in the Electoral College, Kennedy was certified as president. Had Nixon been elected, he would have been the first incumbent vice president since Martin Van Buren to be elected and the second president from California after Herbert Hoover; these feats would be eventually accomplished respectively 28 years later and 12 years later by George H. W. Bush and Nixon himself. Lodge would become the fifth vice president from Massachusetts. In 1968, Nixon ran for president again, and was ultimately elected the 37th U.S. president, serving from 1969 until his resignation in 1974.

== Campaign ==
Richard Nixon was the Vice President of the United States from 1953 to 1961, serving alongside Dwight D. Eisenhower. Prior to this, he was a U.S. Representative from 1947 to 1951 and a Senator from 1951 to 1953.

Henry Cabot Lodge Jr. was the U.S. Ambassador to the United Nations from 1953 to 1961. Before this, he was a Senator from Massachusetts.

=== Republican primaries ===
In late 1959, New York Governor Nelson Rockefeller suggested that he would run for the Republican presidential nomination, but withdrew in December after "almost total opposition by Republican Party leaders". Nixon then joined the primaries, and faced no serious opposition. In July 1960, at the Republican National Convention in Chicago, Nixon accepted the party's nomination and nominated Lodge to be his running mate.

=== General election ===
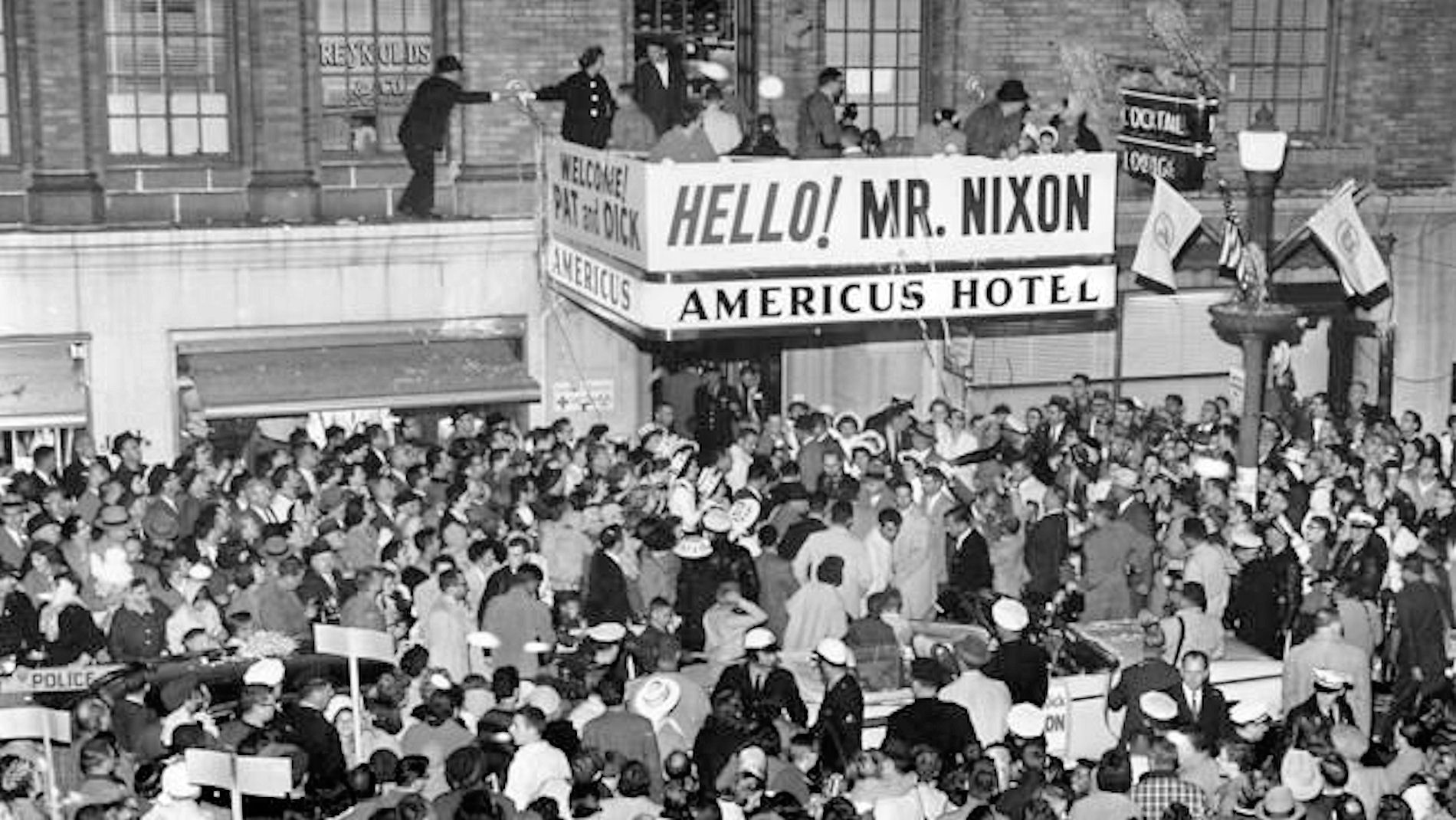
Nixon visits Allentown, Pennsylvania in 1960

Nixon's campaign manager was Robert Finch. Nixon had the advantage of Eisenhower being a popular president. He promised to continue Eisenhower's work and "improve upon them in such areas as welfare programs, foreign aid, and defense." His main opponents in the general election were Massachusetts Senator John F. Kennedy and Texas Senator Lyndon B. Johnson, Democrats. Nixon's campaigning was more intense than Kennedy, in that he traveled to more locations at a faster pace and for a longer time. He became the first presidential candidate to visit every state during the election season. His campaign had two official songs: "Click with Dick" and "Buckle Down with Nixon".

The election happened "amid a rapidly shifting political terrain". White southerners had previously solidly stayed Democrat, but was shifting to the Republican Party as the Democrats promoted civil rights in the South; for this same reason, historically-Republican New England was shifting to the Democrats. As a result of these changes, Politico writes, "both Kennedy and Nixon were trying to simultaneously appeal to urban Black people and white southerners, an exercise in political tightrope-walking."

An ad by the Nixon campaign, describing his foreign policy

Both Kennedy and Nixon were against communists and the Soviet Union, though Nixon was arguably more hawkish towards them. He said that in a hypothetical war with the Soviet Union, nuclear weapons "would inevitably be employed". Nixon, like Kennedy, supported Zionism in Israel. Another major issue was Kennedy's Catholic faith, at a time of widespread anti-Catholic sentiment. Nixon gave his opinion on the matter while speaking to a group of Protestant ministers in Houston on September 12:

I believe in an America that is officially neither Catholic, Protestant nor Jewish—where no public official either requests or accepts instructions on public policy from the Pope, the National Council of Churches or any other ecclesiastical source—where no religious body seeks to impose its will directly or indirectly upon the general populace or the public acts of its officials—and where religious liberty is so indivisible that an act against one church is treated as an act against all.

Full broadcast of the September 26, 1960 debate

There were four televised debates between Nixon and Kennedy. The first debate on September 26, 1960, which received around 70 million viewers, is the subject of disagreement by writers over how detrimental it was to Nixon. Nixon had a "sweaty, haggard appearance" because of the studio's hot stage lights, and a knee infection caused by septic arthritis, for which he got treated at Walter Reed Army Medical Center in August. Journalist Theodore H. White writes: "Until the cameras opened on the senator and the vice-president, Kennedy had been the boy under assault and attack by the vice-president as immature, young, inexperienced. Now, obviously, in flesh and behavior, he was the vice-president’s equal." In 2024, The Conversation wrote that there was no unanimity regarding Nixon's appearance in the news media at the time: columnist Walter Liptmann wrote that the cameras "made him look sick, which he is not, and they made him look older and more worn than he is", whereas The Washington Post wrote: "Of the two performances Mr. Nixon’s was probably the smoother. He is an accomplished debater with a professional polish, and he managed to convey a slightly patronizing air of a master instructing a pupil." The Conversation writes that was arguably more detrimental was Nixon's seeming "defensive and deferential" attitudes towards topics Kennedy brought up.

In October, columnist Drew Pearson accused Nixon of having a conflict of interest as vice president; on December 10, 1956, Nixon's mother, Hannah Nixon, allegedly received a $205,000 loan from the Hughes Tool Company, owned by Howard Hughes. Afterwards, Pearson wrote, Hughes' "problems with various government agencies had improved". Robert Finch responded to the allegation by saying it was "an obvious political smear in the last two weeks of the campaign", and that the loan actually came from Frank J. Waters, a California attorney who was Nixon's friend. Nixon had no comment.

=== Endorsements ===
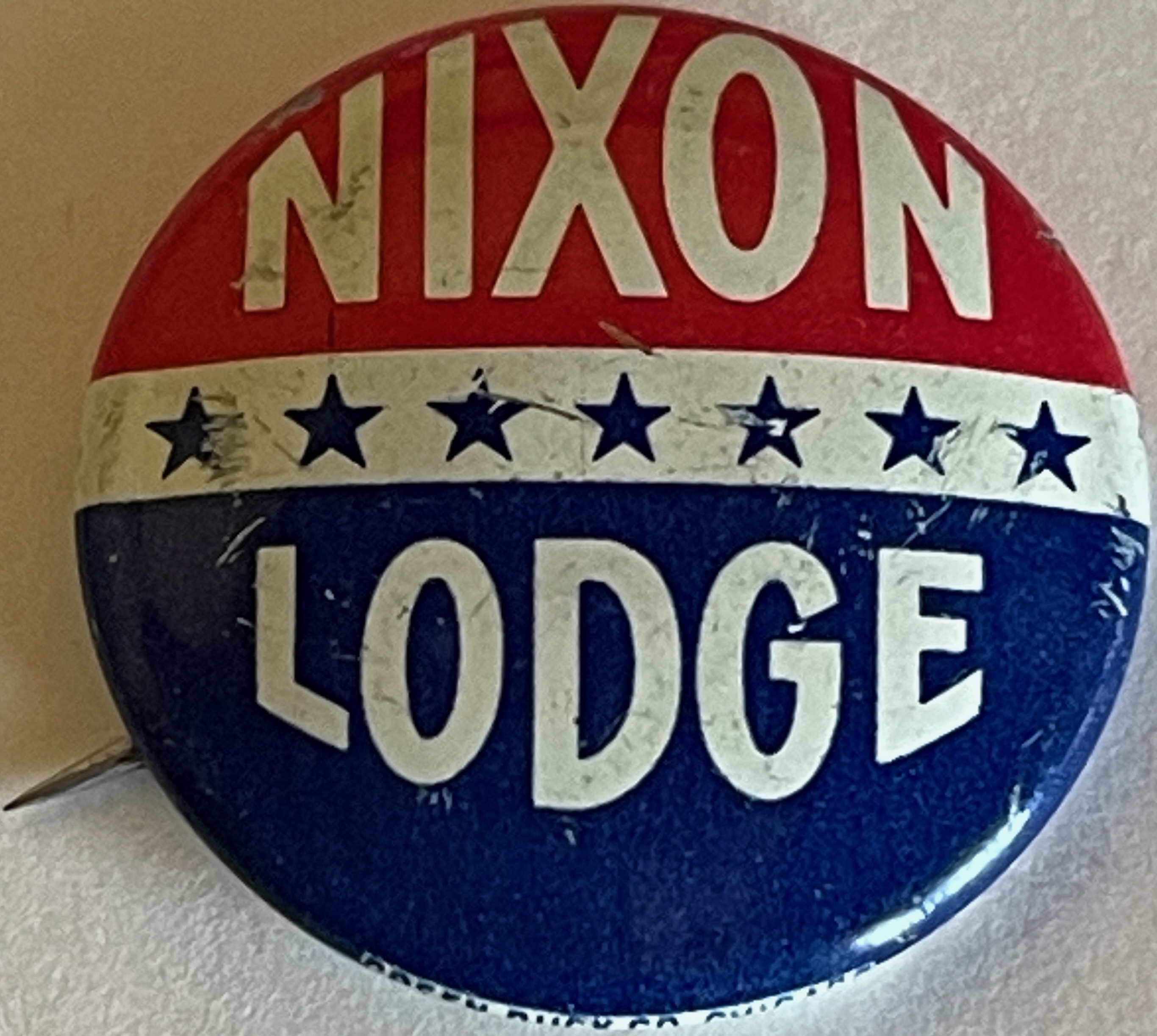
Campaign button

Black former baseball player Jackie Robinson, a major celebrity, endorsed Nixon after meeting with both candidates, which went against common sentiment among Black voters. He supported Hubert Humphrey in the Democratic primaries, but wrote that he also liked Nixon:

Though the Democratic nominee is still undetermined at this point, it would be folly to underestimate the impression Nixon’s generally good civil rights record has made among Negroes. I’ve been following Nixon’s career for some time now, and I don’t mind admitting that generally I’ve liked what I’ve seen and heard.

— Jackie Robinson, Robinson's column in a Black-demographic newspaper, the Chicago Defender, in 1960

When Robinson met with Nixon, he disliked when Nixon stopped their conversation to take a phone call in which he seemed to state he was planning to get Robinson to dissociate him (Nixon) from Eisenhower, as Black people generally did not trust Eisenhower. Robinson viewed this as a "cheap trick". However, he found his meeting with Kennedy afterwards to be worse; he wrote that Kennedy "admitted a lack of any depth of understanding about black people". Robinson then endorsed Nixon, receiving animosity from some Black community leaders like Malcolm X.

Civil rights leader Martin Luther King Sr. initially endorsed Nixon for president, as he did not support Kennedy for religious reasons. On October 19, 1960, however, Martin Luther King Jr. was arrested in Atlanta for protesting against a segregated department store. A judge ordered that King Jr. be jailed for three months for violating probation for a minor traffic offense. Jackie Robinson contacted Nixon, asking him to help King Jr.; Nixon declined, saying it would be "grandstanding". Fearing he would not survive, King Jr.'s wife Coretta Scott King contacted the Kennedy campaign to see if they could help. Robert Kennedy then was able to get King out of prison on bail, and King Sr. said he had a "suitcase full of votes" for Kennedy. Politico writes that this could have decided the election.

== Results ==
Electoral college results of the general election, November 8, 1960

68 million people voted in the general election. The news media projected on November 8 that Kennedy had won. In the popular vote, Nixon lost to Kennedy by approximately 118,000 votes, or 0.2 percentage points, which was the closest race a U.S. presidential election had been since 1884. In the Electoral College, Kennedy would receive 303 votes and Nixon 219. 15 southern unpledged and faithless electors cast votes for Senator Harry Byrd from Virginia as an attempt to preserve southern segregation.

Nixon was urged to contest the election results due to accusations of voter fraud that were popularized by Nixon's friend, journalist Earl Mazo. Republican operatives, led by Robert Finch, Thurston B. Morton, and Leonard W. Hall, announced investigations into 11 states' results for irregularities: Delaware, Michigan, Minnesota, Missouri, New Jersey, New Mexico, Nevada, Pennsylvania, and South Carolina. They found some irregularities in Illinois and Texas which may have meant Kennedy did not legally win those states. Kennedy won by 8,000 to 9,000 votes in Illinois, and in Texas by 46,000 votes. Morton claimed the Republican Party received, as Politico wrote, "35,000 letters and telegrams with anecdotal accounts of fraud". In Illinois, Chicago mayor Richard Daley was accused of using his "political machine" to influence the vote towards Kennedy, and in Texas, Lyndon B. Johnson was accused of doing the same thing. (Daley had a history of ballot manipulation, and Johnson was previously accused of cheating in his 1948 Senate run.) The Democratic National Committee chairman, Henry L. Jackson, called the investigation effort "a fishing expedition on a grand scale", and former U.S. President Harry Truman called the effort "a lot of hooey" from "just a bunch of poor losers".

Nixon declined to contest the results. He publicly said:

I could think of no worse example for nations abroad, who for the first time were trying to put free electoral procedures into effect, than that of the United States wrangling over the results of our presidential election, and even suggesting that the presidency itself could be stolen by thievery at the ballot box.

On November 9, Nixon conceded to Kennedy. In December, as the Electoral College vote was underway, Hawaii's three electors voted for Kennedy despite Nixon winning the state by 140 popular votes. Later that month, Nixon held a Christmas party at his home, in which he said to his guests, "We won, but they stole it from us". Nixon later claimed in his biography, Six Crises, that voter fraud had occurred in Illinois and Texas. Historian Edmund Kallina, however, writes that the discrepancies in the Chicago vote count were not large enough to give the state to Nixon if they had not occurred.

== Aftermath ==
Nixon temporarily retired to private life after the election. In 1962, he unsuccessfully ran for Governor of California, losing to the Democrat Pat Brown. In 1968, Nixon successfully ran for president again and was ultimately elected as the 37th president of the United States, serving from 1969 until his resignation in 1974.

In 2020, Republican candidate then-incumbent president Donald Trump lost the presidential election and attempted to overturn the election results. His allies argued that their claims of voter fraud had historical precedent in how Hawaii's electors voted for Kennedy instead of Nixon; no evidence of widespread fraud in the 2020 election has been found.

== See also ==
- 1960 Republican Party presidential primaries
- 1960 Republican Party vice presidential candidate selection
- 1960 Republican National Convention
- 1960 United States presidential election
- John F. Kennedy 1960 presidential campaign
- Richard Nixon 1968 presidential campaign
- Richard Nixon 1972 presidential campaign
