= 1960 Republican National Convention =

Political convention of the Republican Party

- 1960 presidential election
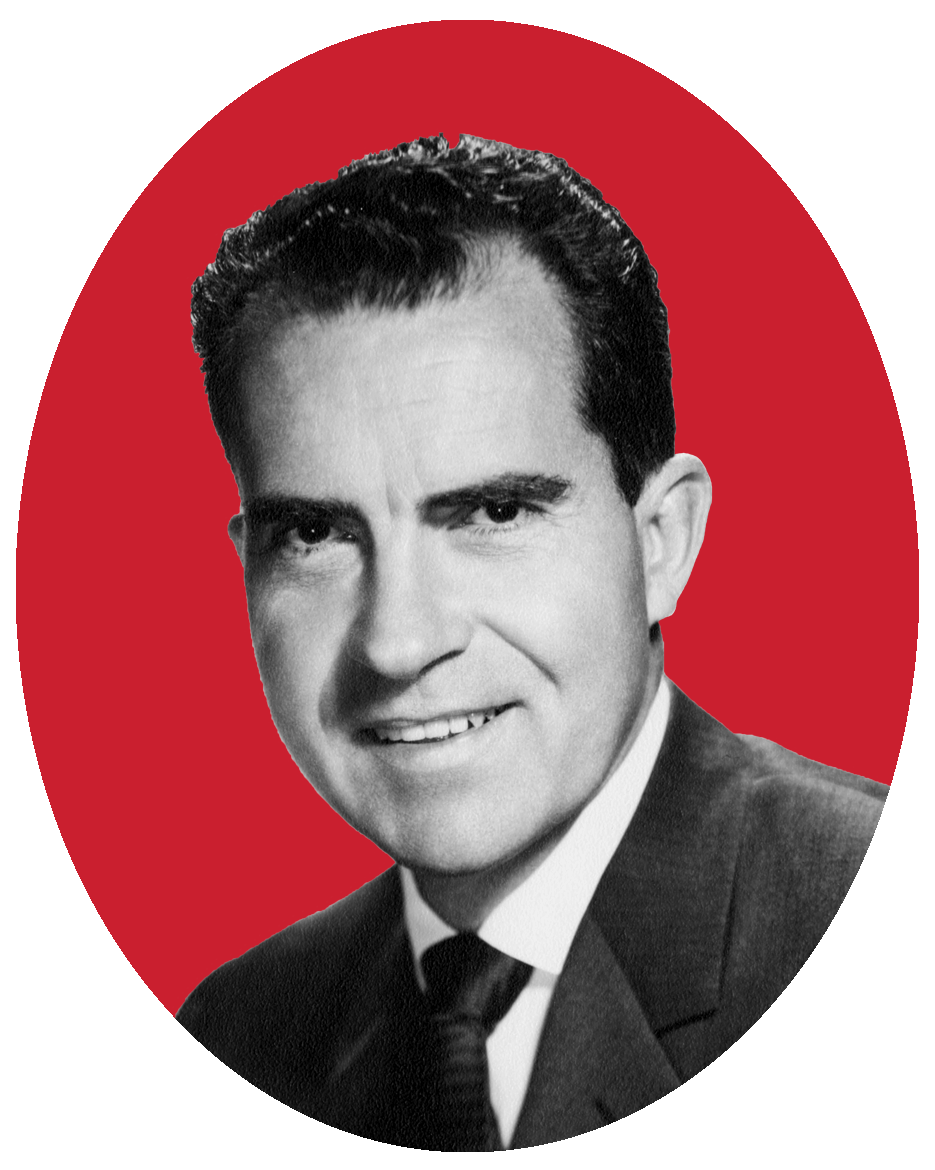
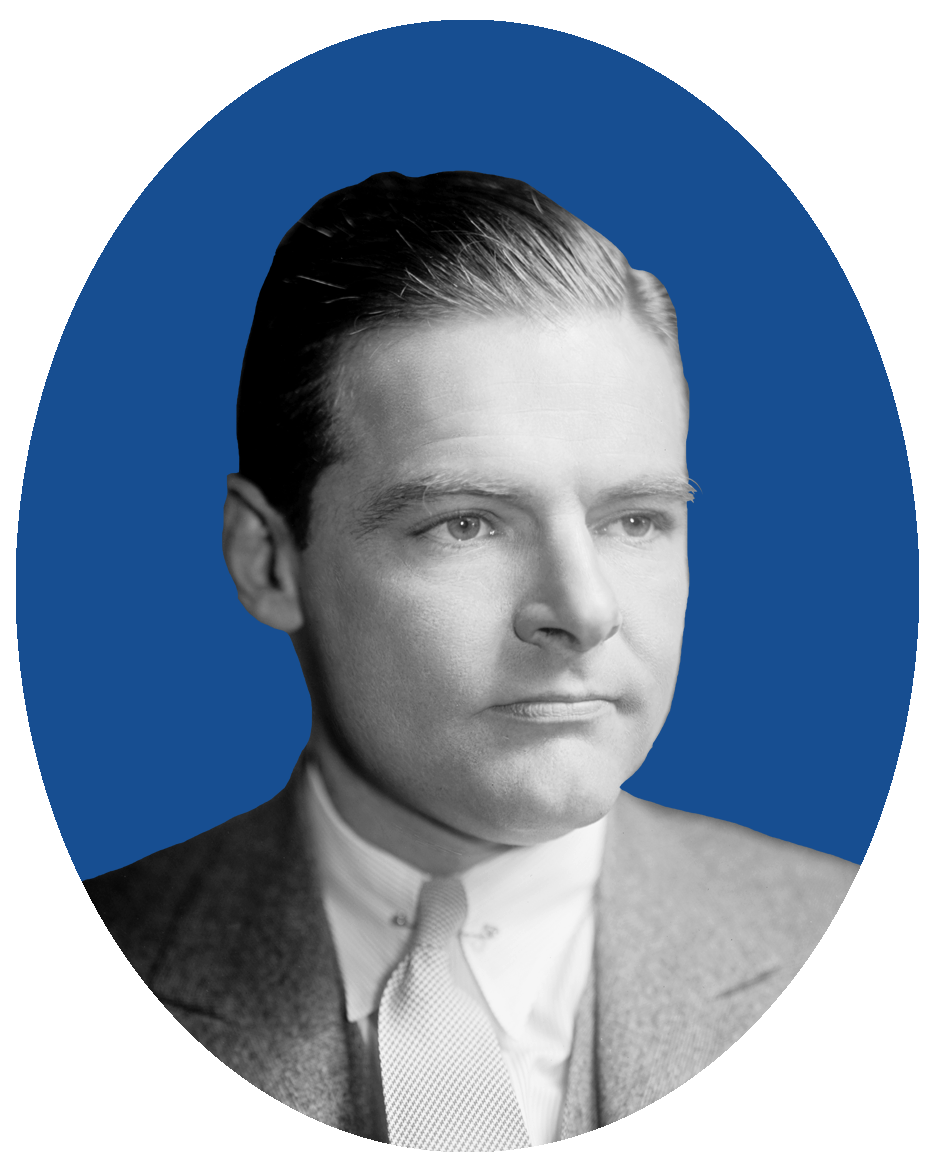
- Nominees; Nixon and Lodge

Convention
- Dates: July 25–28, 1960
- City: Chicago
- Venue: International Amphitheatre

Candidates
- Presidential nominee: Richard M. Nixon of California
- Vice-presidential nominee: Henry C. Lodge Jr. of Massachusetts

Highlights of 1960 Republican convention

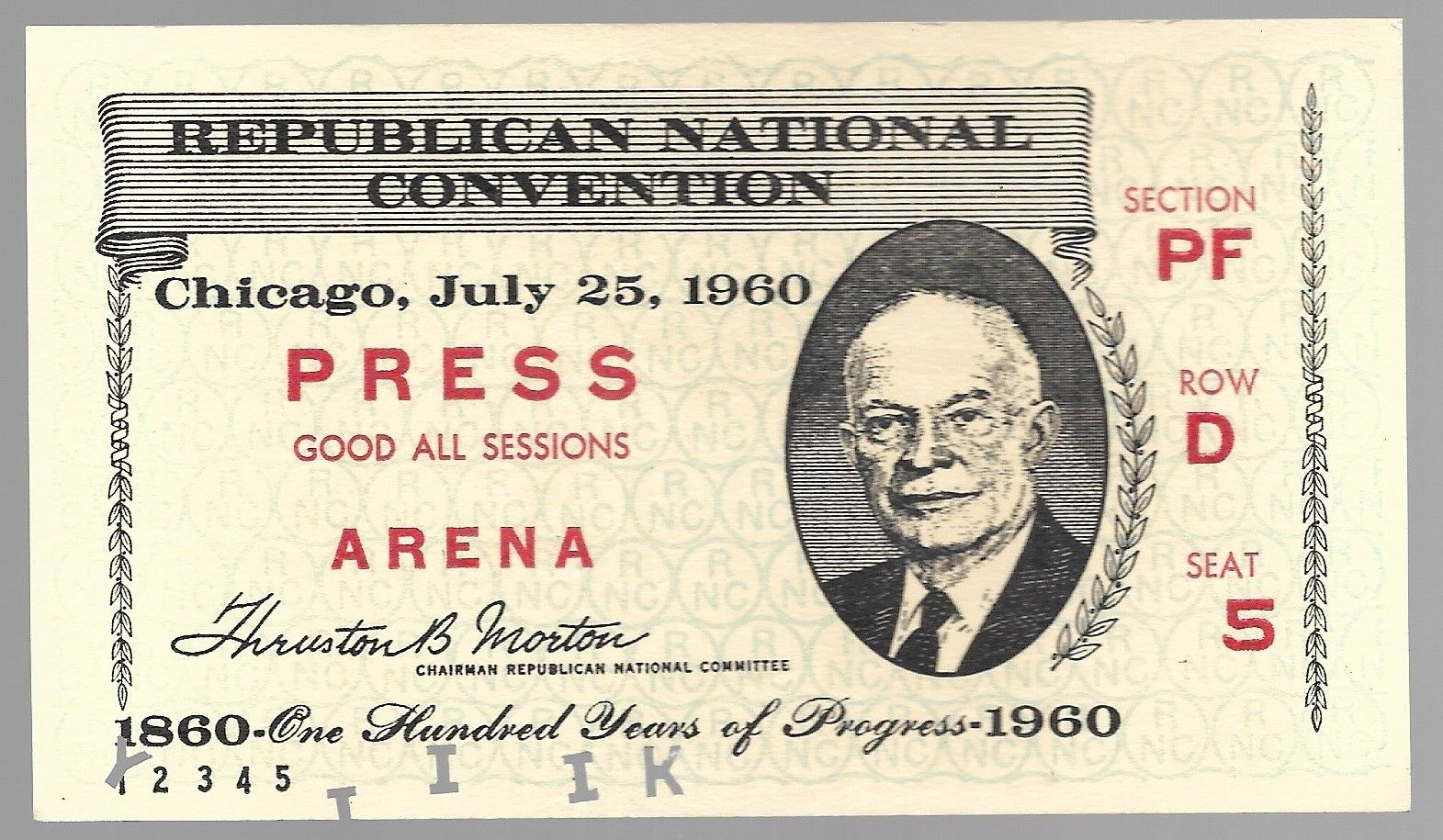
Entrance ticket, featuring an illustration of term-limited incumbent Republican president Dwight D. Eisenhower

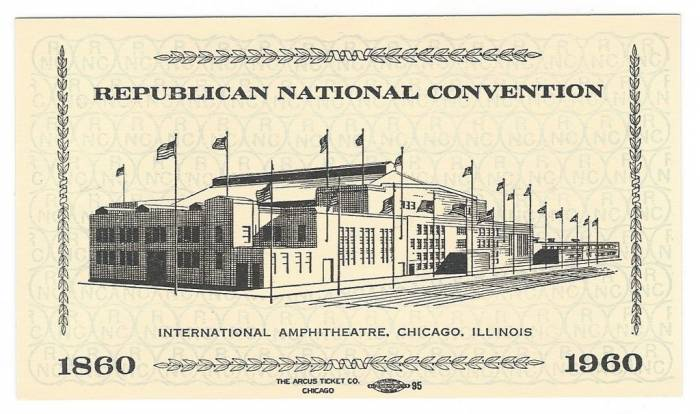
Backside of an entrance ticket, featuring an illustration of the International Amphitheatre (the main venue of the convention)

The 1960 Republican National Convention was held in Chicago, Illinois, from July 25 to July 28, 1960, at the International Amphitheatre. It was the 14th and most recent time overall that Chicago hosted the Republican National Convention, more times than any other city.

The convention nominated then Vice President of the United States Richard Nixon for President of the United States and former Senator Henry Cabot Lodge Jr. of Massachusetts for vice president.

== Presidential nomination ==
=== Presidential candidates ===
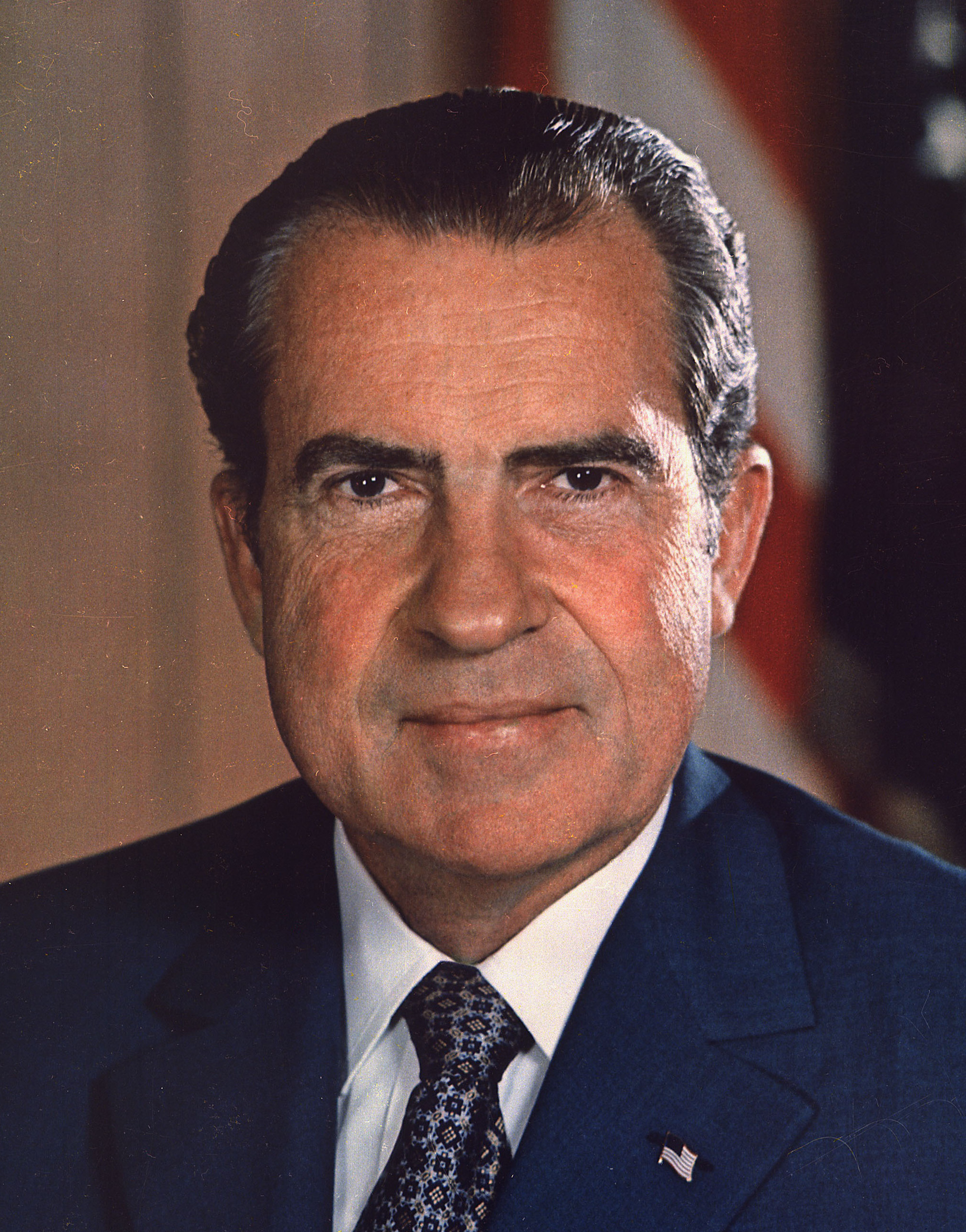
Vice President
Richard Nixon
of California

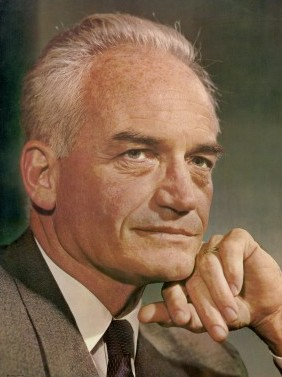
Senator
Barry Goldwater
of Arizona
(Declined Consideration)

By the time the Republican convention opened, Nixon had no opponents for the nomination. The highlight of the convention was the speech by U.S. Senator Barry Goldwater of Arizona removing himself from the race, in which he called on conservatives to "take back" the party. Nixon won easily, earning 1,321 votes to 10 for Goldwater. At the convention, Nixon promised that he would visit every state during his campaign.

Presidential Balloting
Candidate	1st
Nixon	1,321
Goldwater	10

Presidential Balloting / 3rd Day of Convention (July 27, 1960)

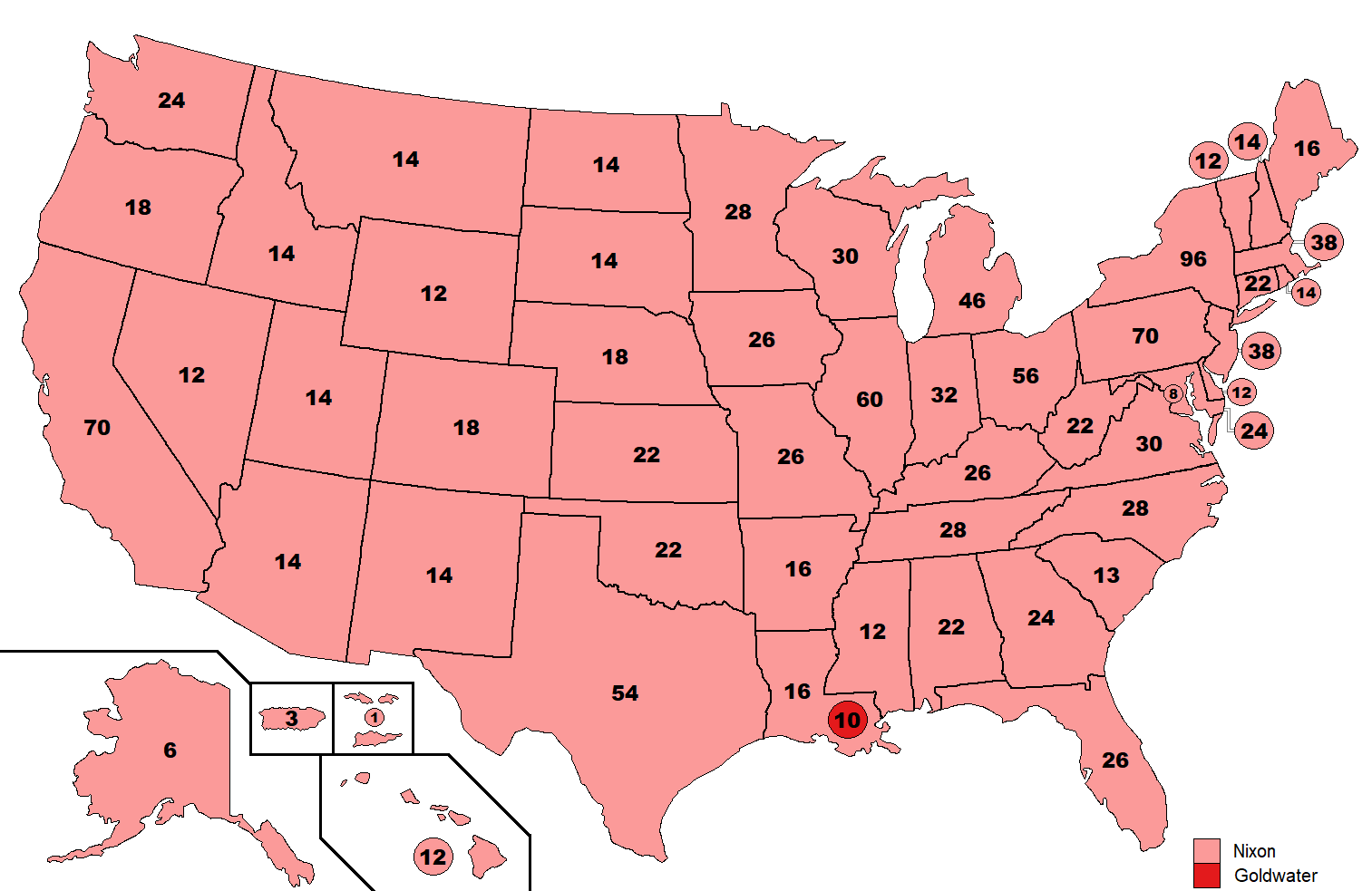
1st Presidential Ballot

== Vice Presidential nomination ==
=== Vice Presidential candidates ===
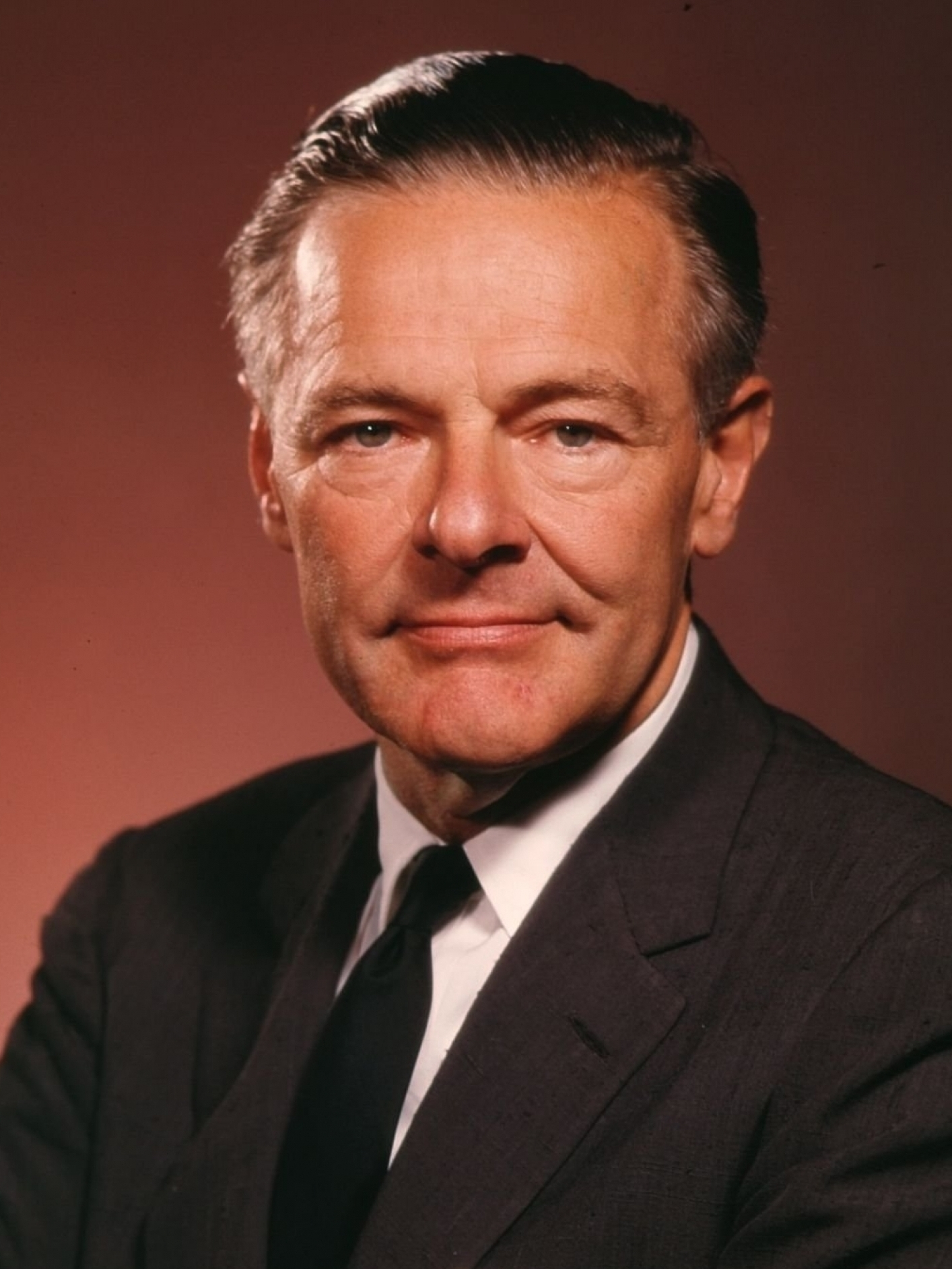
UN Ambassador
Henry Cabot Lodge Jr.
of Massachusetts

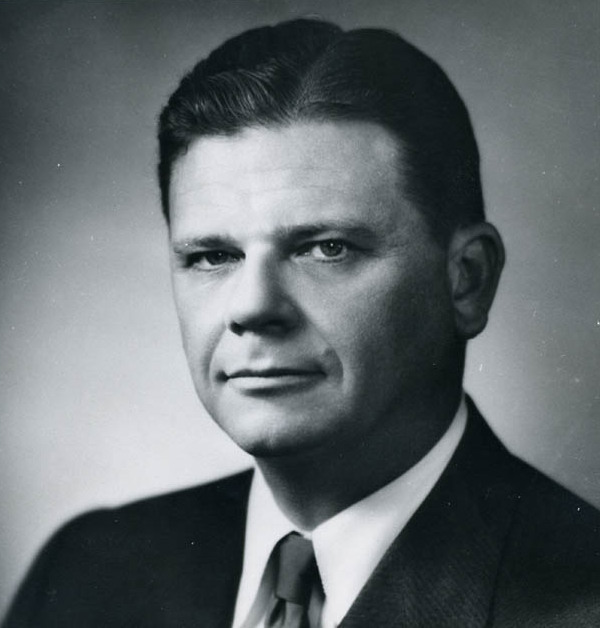
Senator
Thruston B. Morton
of Kentucky

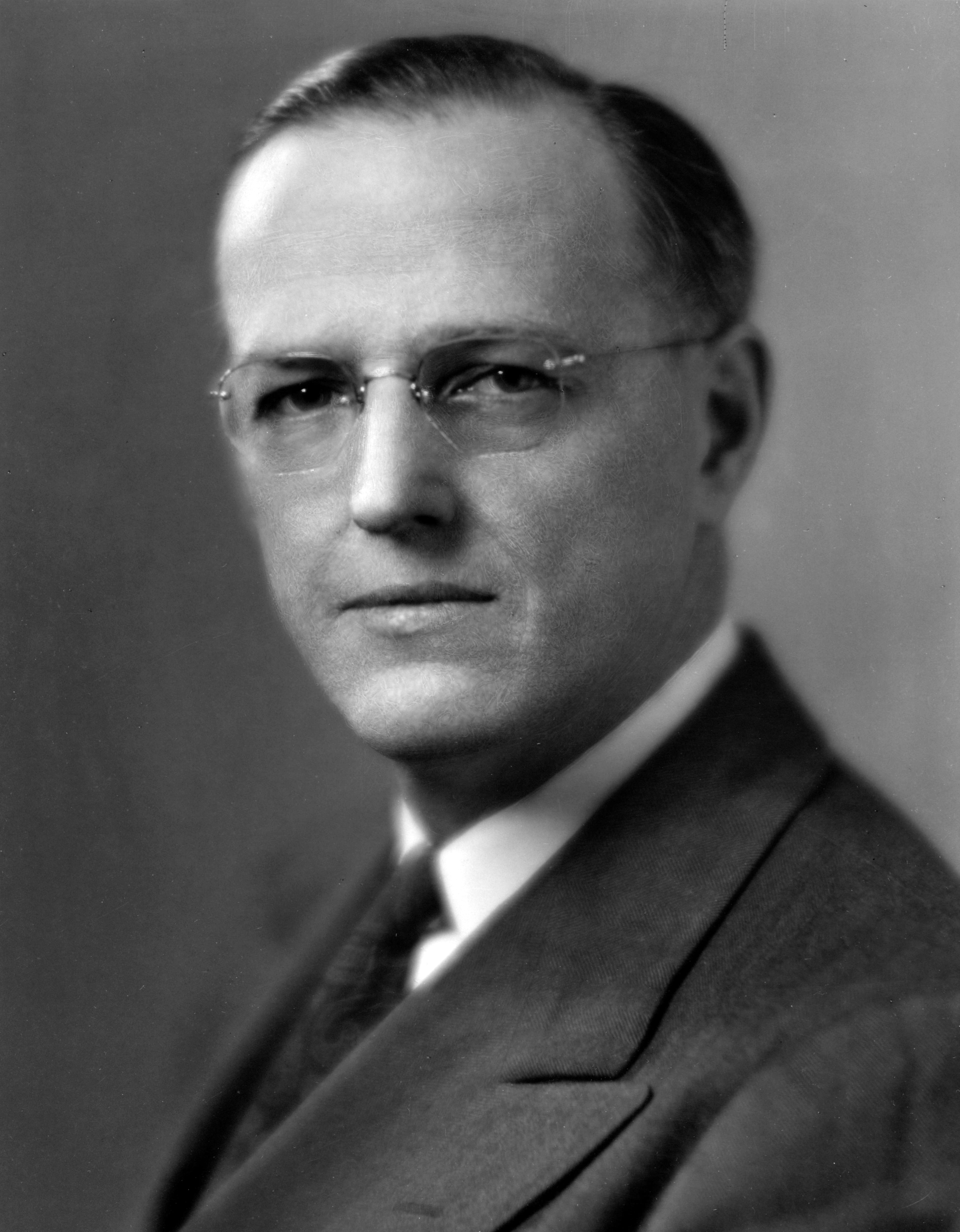
Representative
Walter Judd
of Minnesota

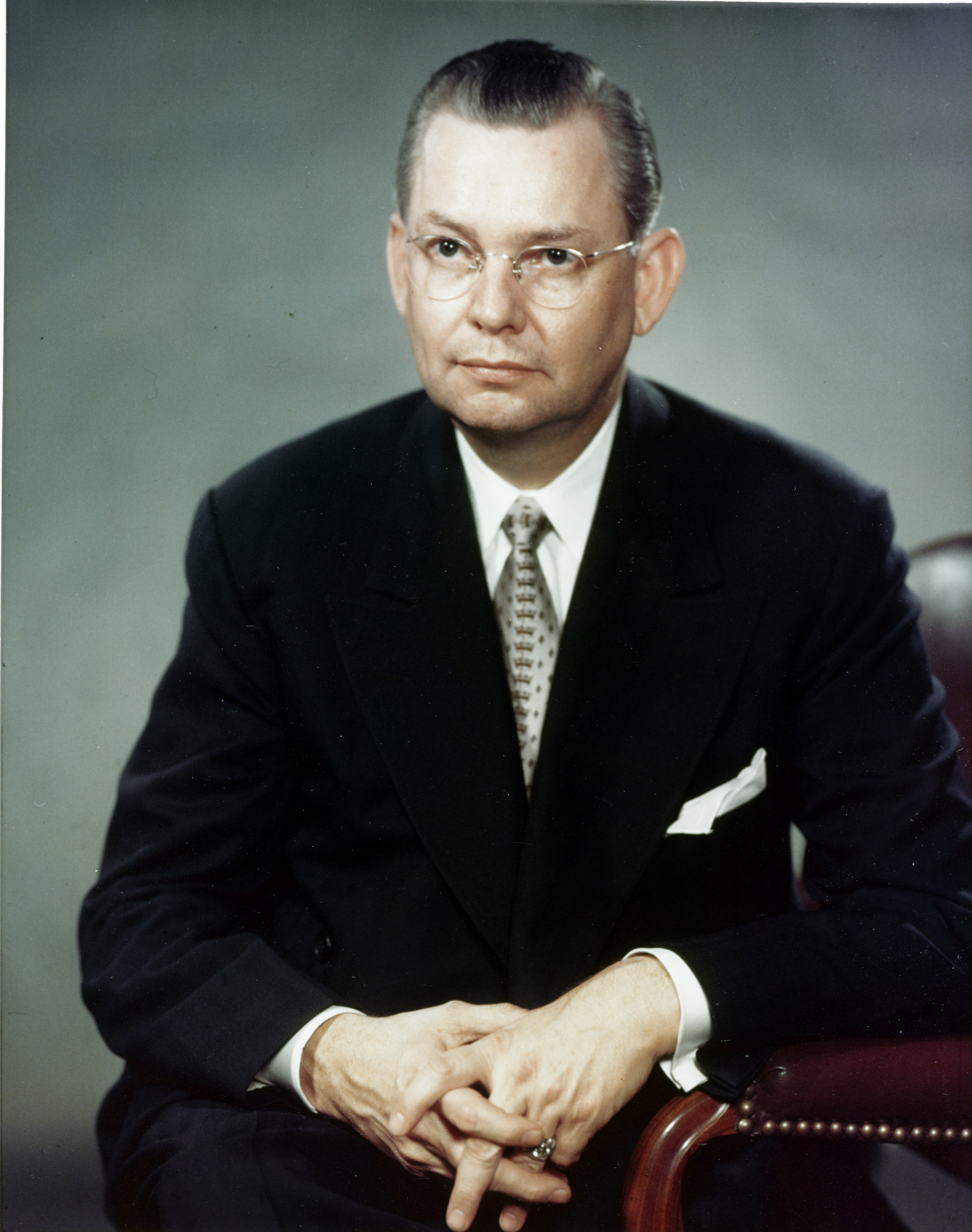
Treasury Secretary
Robert B. Anderson
of Texas

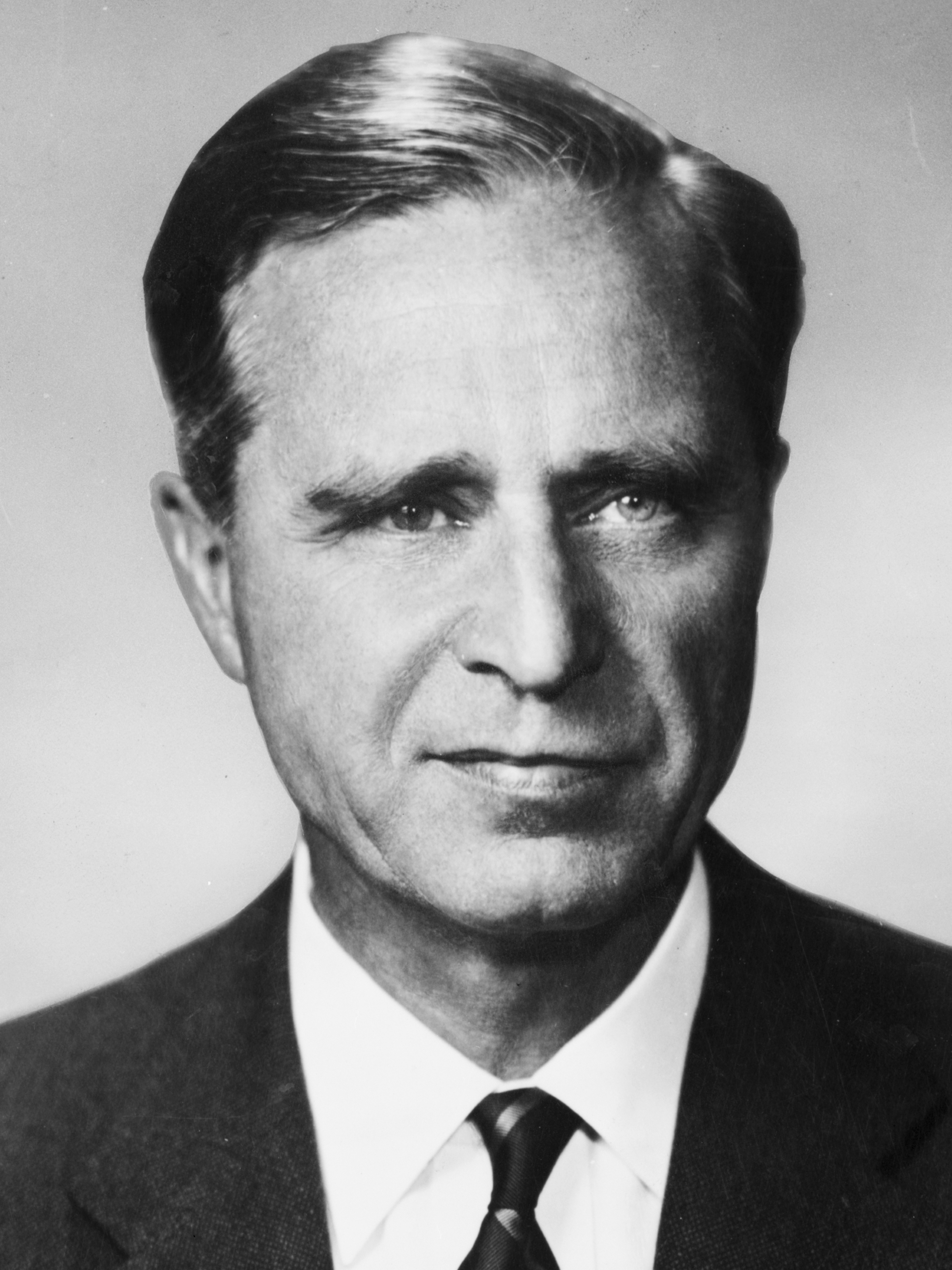
Senator
Prescott Bush
of Connecticut

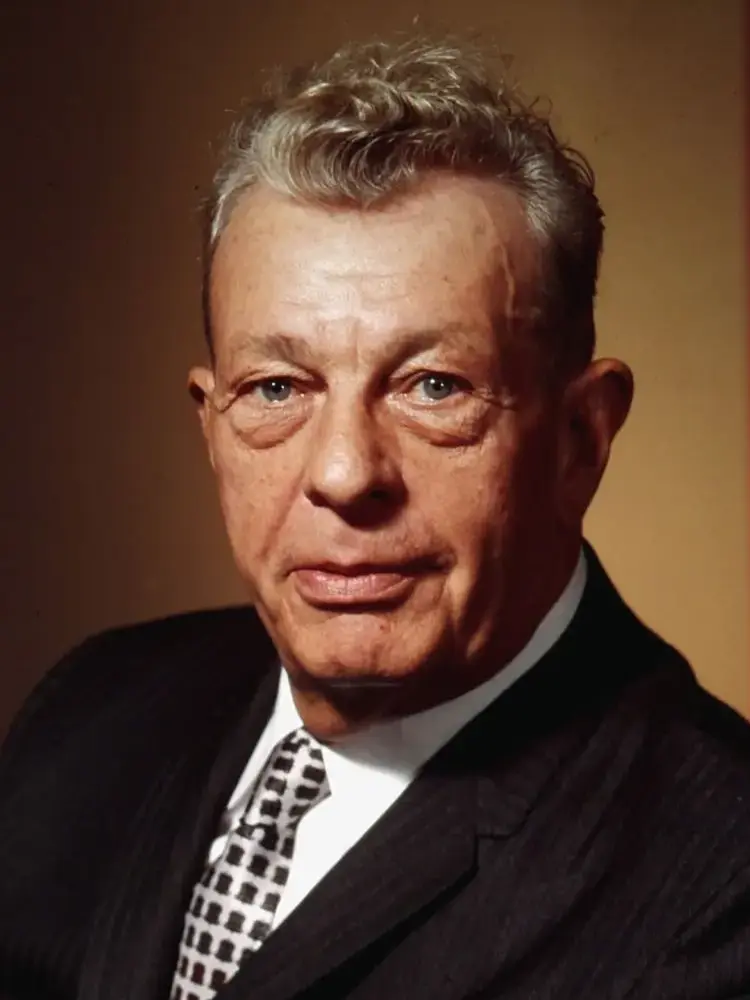
Senate Minority Leader
Everett Dirksen
of Illinois

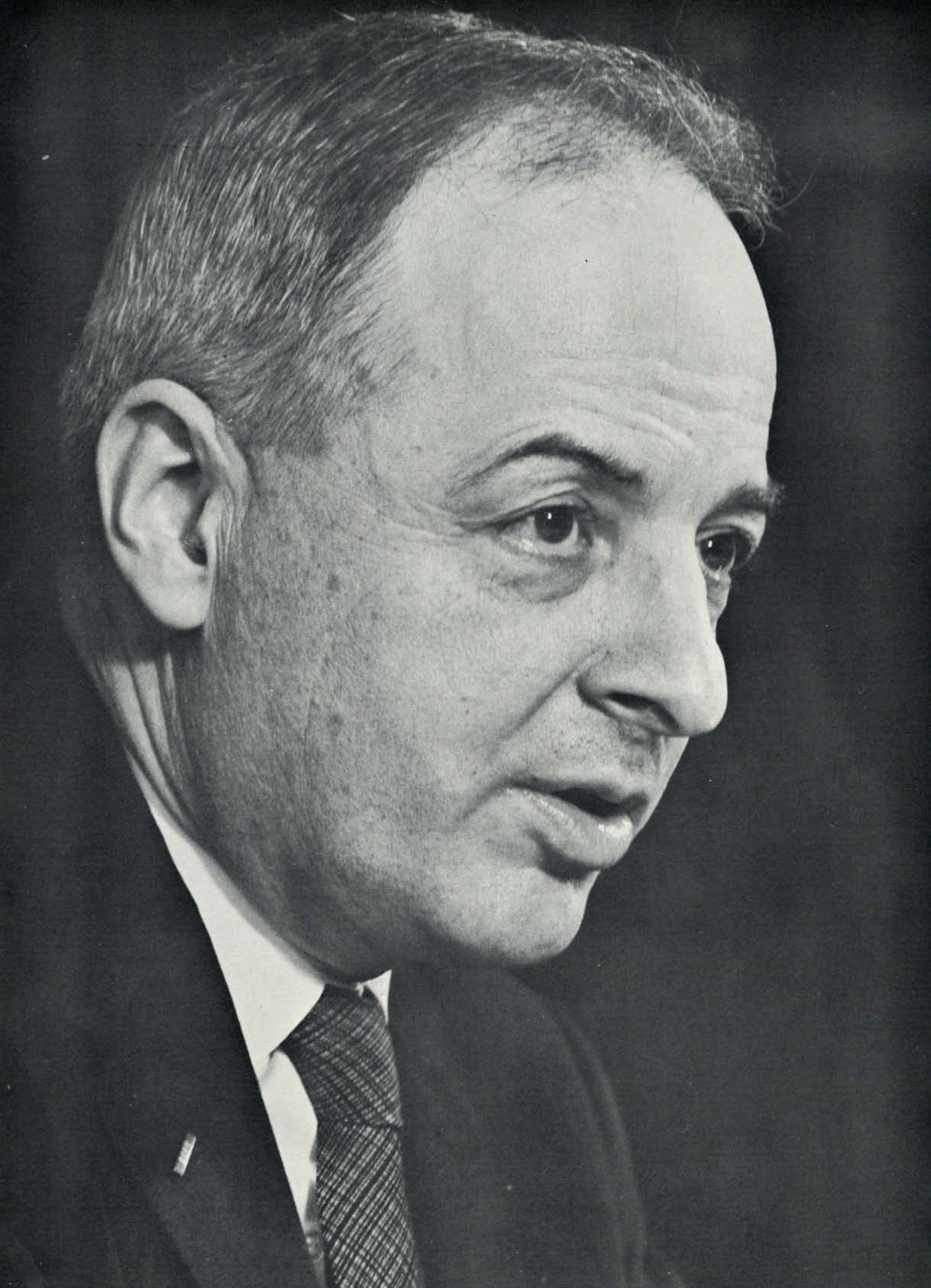
HEW Secretary
Arthur Flemming
of Ohio

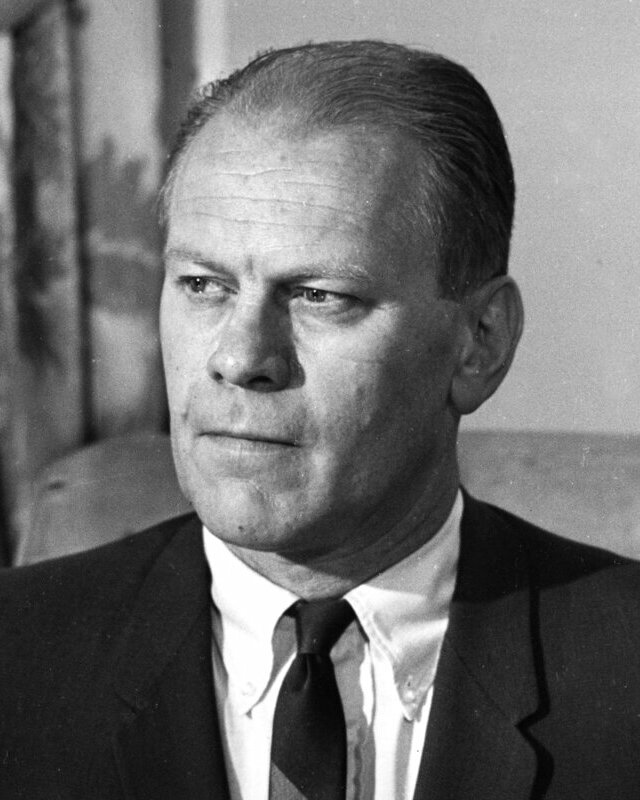
Representative
Gerald Ford
of Michigan

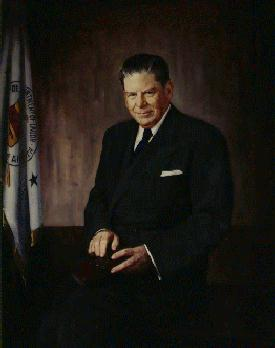
Labor Secretary
James P. Mitchell
of New Jersey

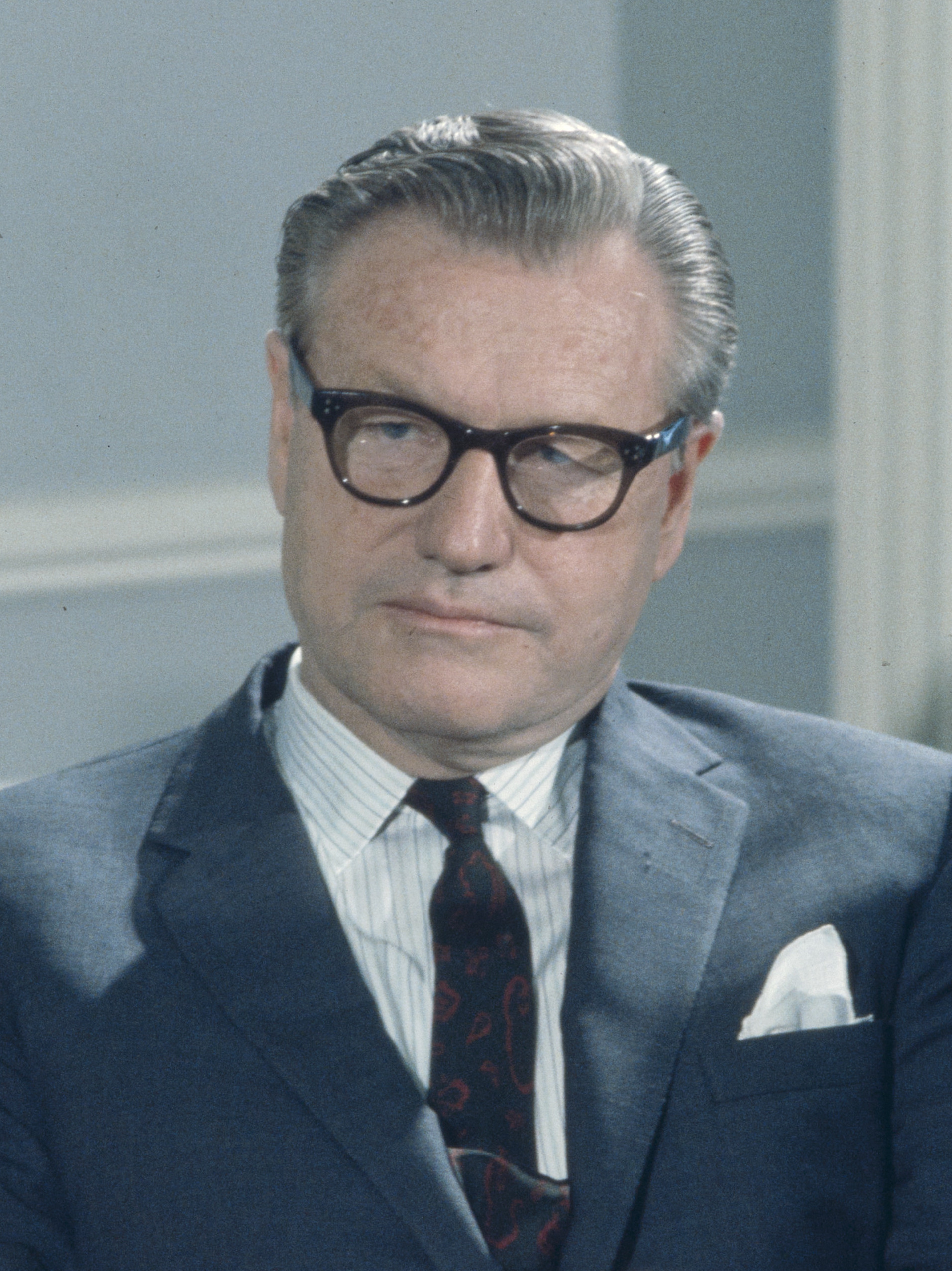
Governor
Nelson Rockefeller
of New York

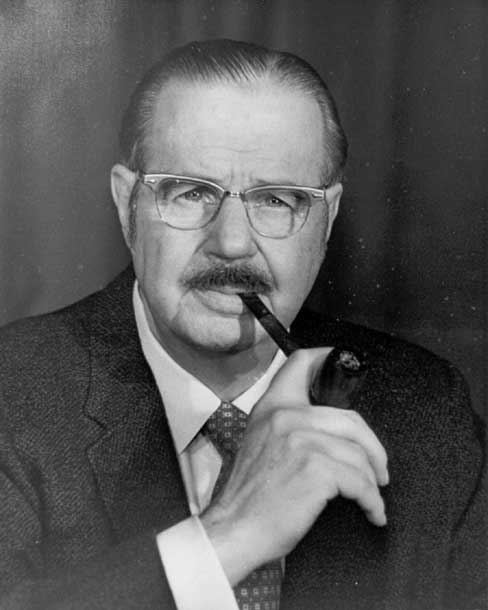
Senator
Hugh Scott
of Pennsylvania

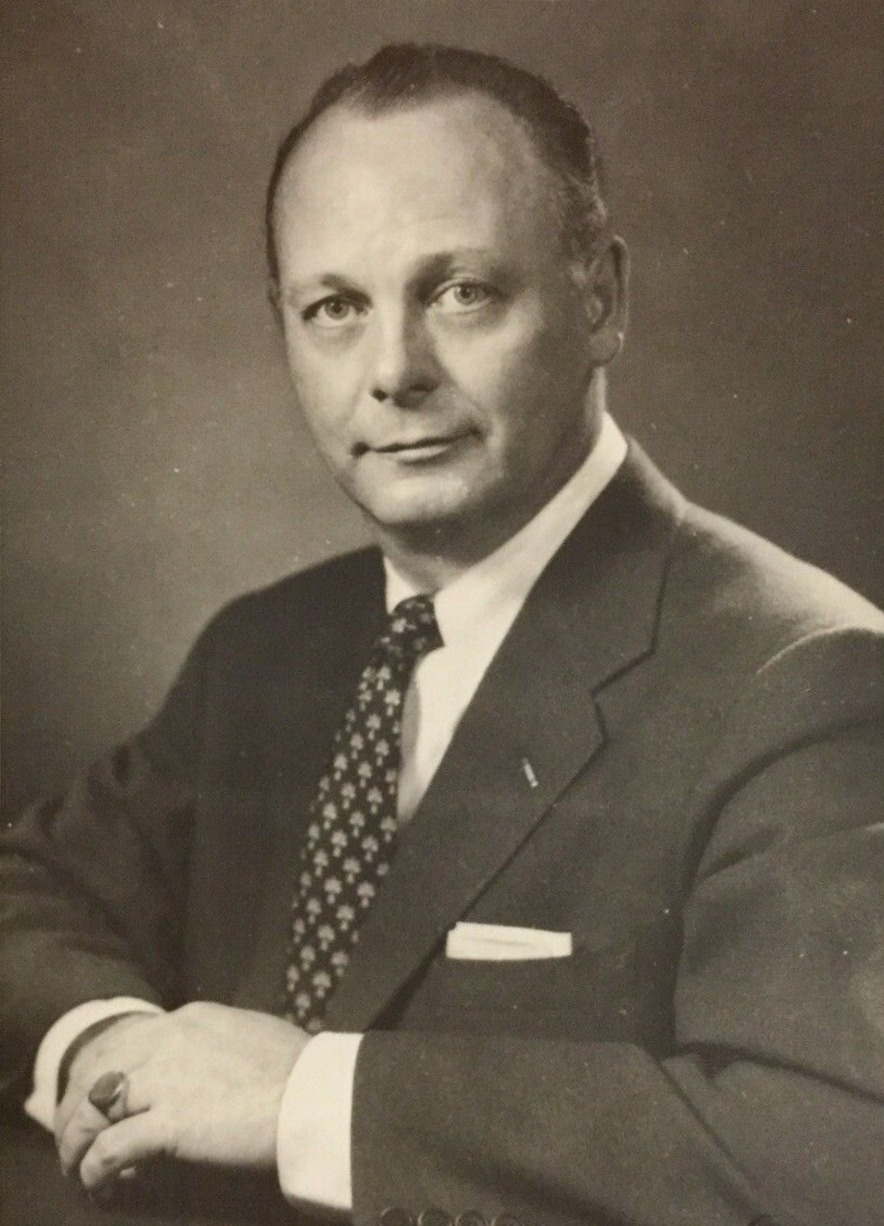
Interior Secretary
Fred A. Seaton
of Nebraska

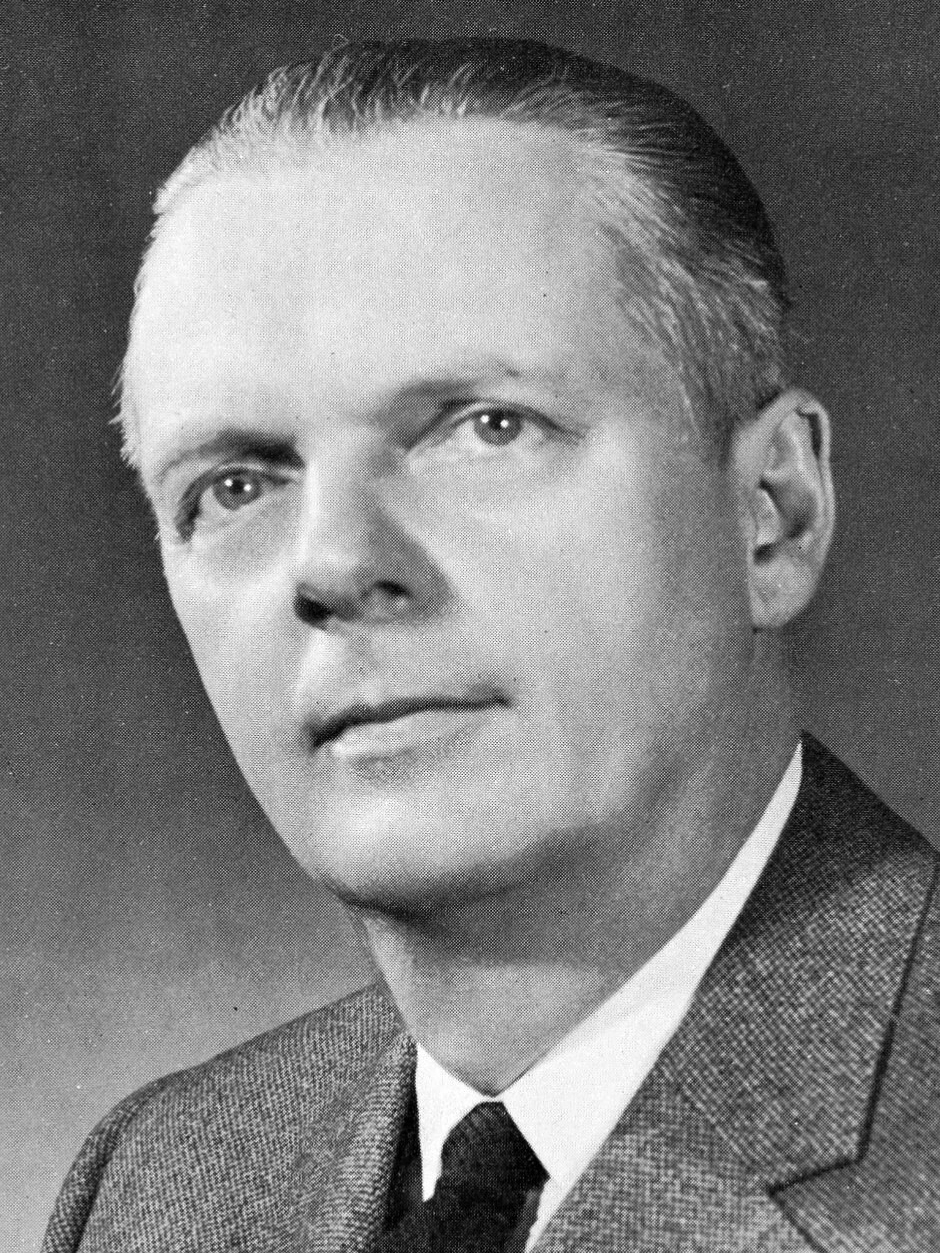
Governor
William Stratton
of Illinois

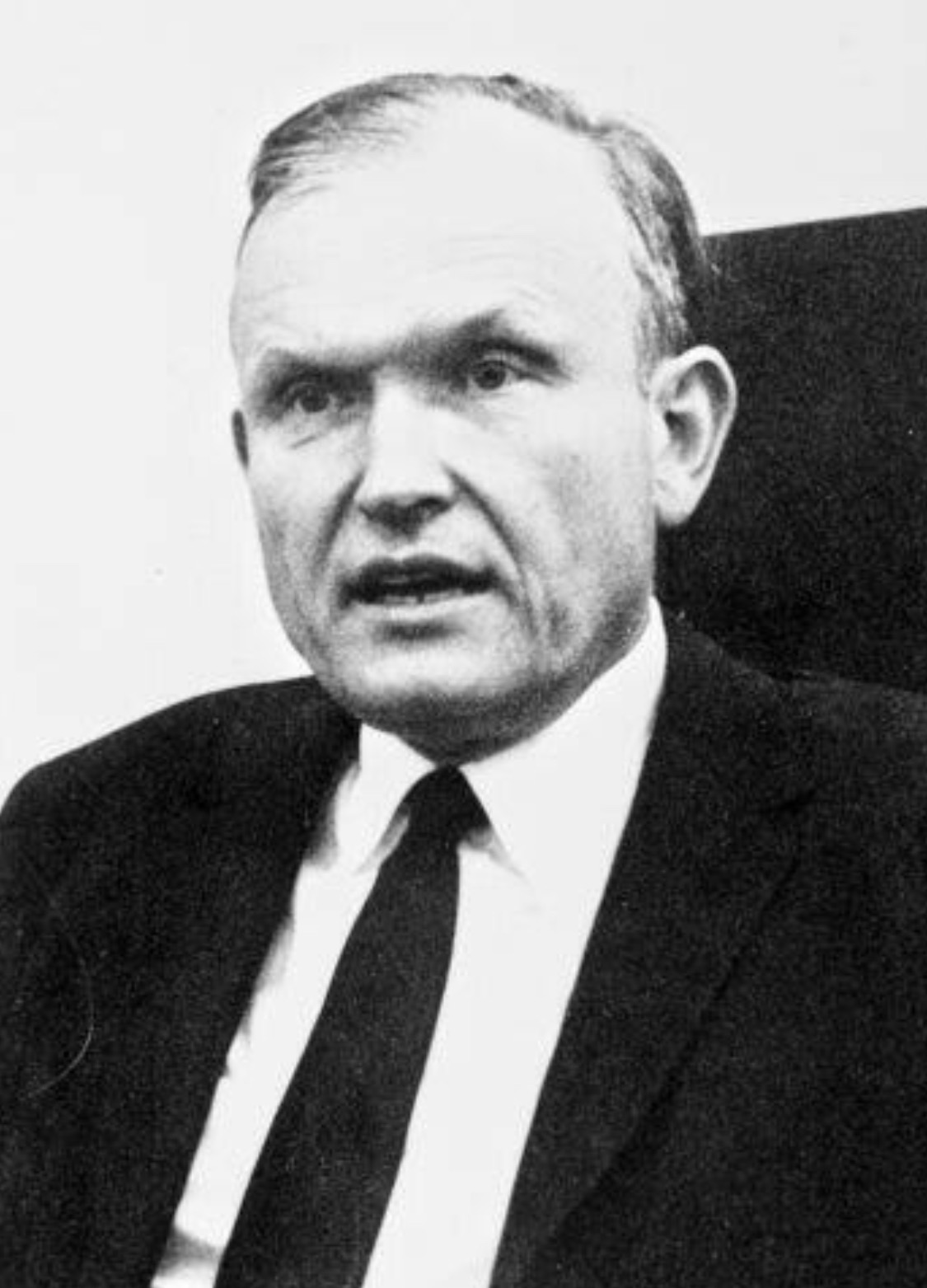
Former State Representative
Philip Willkie
of Indiana

After winning the presidential nomination, Nixon considered several candidates for the vice presidential nomination. Incumbent President Dwight D. Eisenhower strongly supported Henry Cabot Lodge Jr., the United States Ambassador to the United Nations. Though Lodge was not viewed by Republicans as a charismatic speaker, his foreign policy experience as well as his longtime Republican Party ties as a descendant of the Lodge family made him an appealing candidate.

Lodge was unpopular with the conservative wing of the party, who regarded him as a Northeastern moderate. As a result of the conservatives' coolness toward Lodge, Nixon strongly considered conservative Minnesota Representative Walter Judd and U.S. Senator Thruston Morton of Kentucky, an establishment Republican who was more moderate than Judd but had a high profile as chairman of the Republican National Committee.

Other candidates Nixon may have considered include:

- Barry M. Goldwater, U.S. Senator from Arizona (Would be nominated for president in 1964)
- Charles A. Halleck, U.S. House Minority Leader from Indiana
- Neil H. McElroy, former Secretary of Defense from Ohio
- Charles H. Percy, businessman from Illinois
- William P. Rogers, U.S. Attorney General from Maryland

After deciding on Lodge, Nixon participated in a closed session with party leaders, who concurred with his preference. After the session, Nixon announced his choice publicly, and the convention ratified it.

Vice Presidential Balloting
Candidate	1st
Lodge	1,330
Not Voting	1

Vice Presidential Balloting / 4th Day of Convention (July 28, 1960)

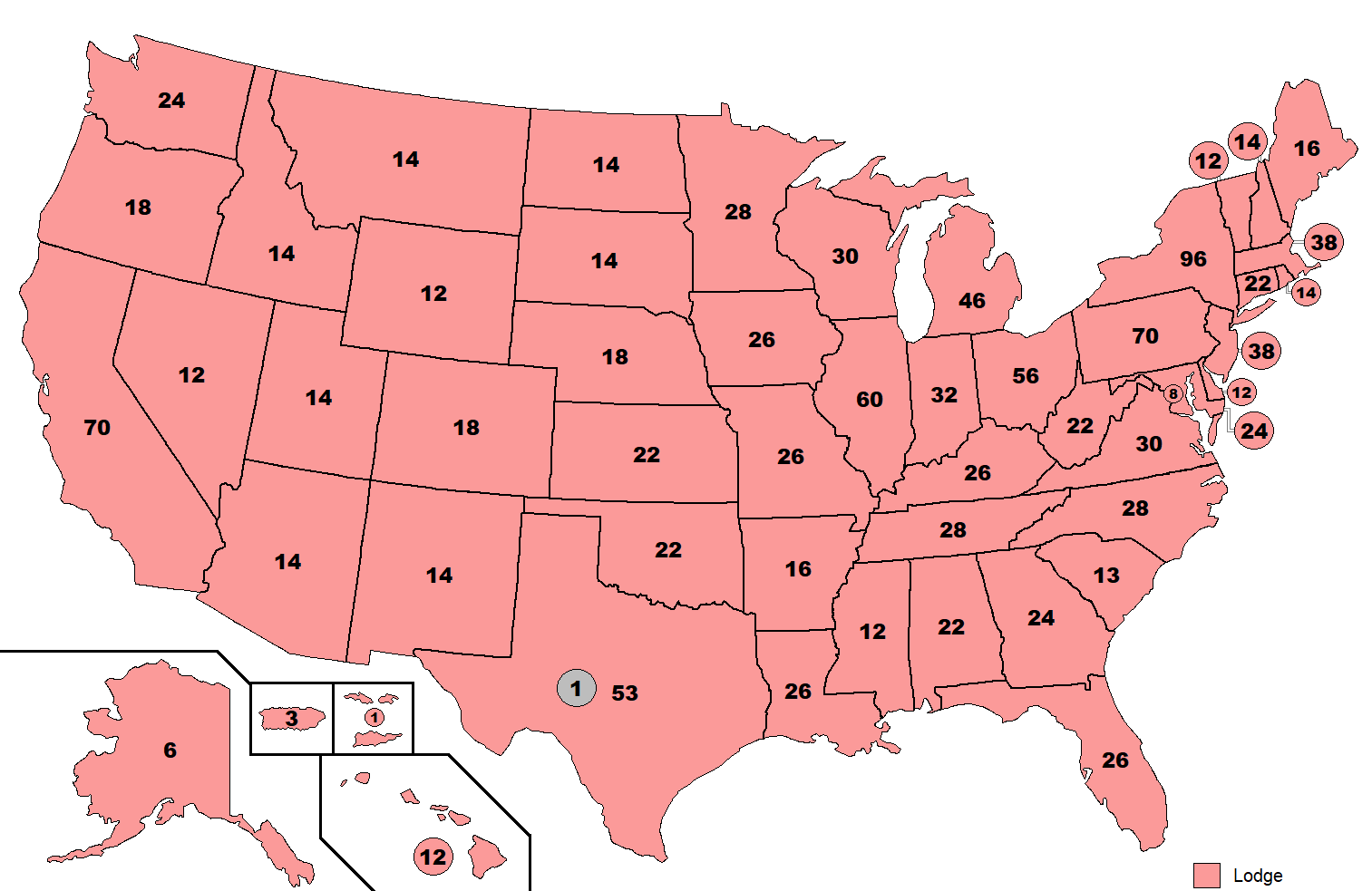
1st
Vice Presidential Ballot

== General election ==
The Nixon-Lodge ticket lost the 1960 election to the Democratic ticket of John F. Kennedy and Lyndon B. Johnson.

== See also ==
- 1960 Democratic National Convention
- 1960 United States presidential election
- History of the United States Republican Party
- List of Republican National Conventions
- United States presidential nominating convention
- Richard Nixon 1960 presidential campaign
- 1960 Republican Party presidential primaries

Preceded by 1956; San Francisco, California	Republican National Conventions	Succeeded by 1964; Daly City, California
