= Richard Nixon 1972 presidential campaign =

American political campaign

Richard Nixon for President 1972
- Nixon–Agnew campaign logo.
- Campaign: 1972 Republican primaries 1972 U.S. presidential election
- Candidate: Richard Nixon; 37th President of the United States (1969–1974); Spiro Agnew; 39th Vice President of the United States (1969–1973)
- Affiliation: Republican Party
- Status: Announced: January 7, 1972; Official nominee: August 23, 1972; Won election: November 7, 1972; Certification: January 6, 1973; Inaugurated: January 20, 1973
- Slogan(s): President Nixon. Now more than ever Re-elect the President
- Theme song: "Nixon Now" by Ken Sutherland

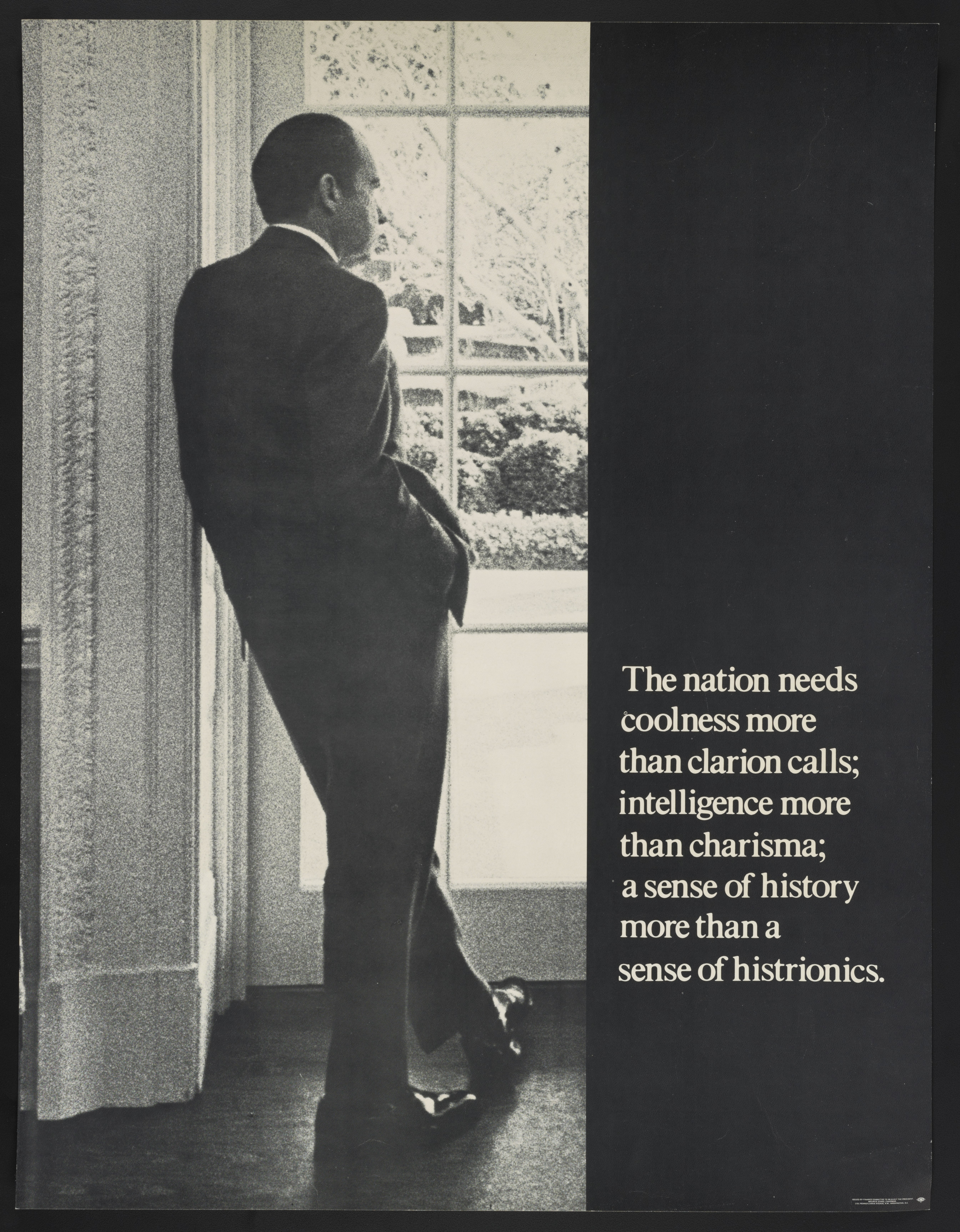
Nixon '72 poster, with text: "The Nation needs coolness more than clarion calls; intelligence more than charisma; a sense of history more than a sense of histrionics."

The 1972 presidential campaign of Richard Nixon was a successful re-election campaign for President Richard Nixon and Vice President Spiro Agnew. They were re-elected president and vice president after decisively defeating George McGovern and Sargent Shriver of the Democratic Party.

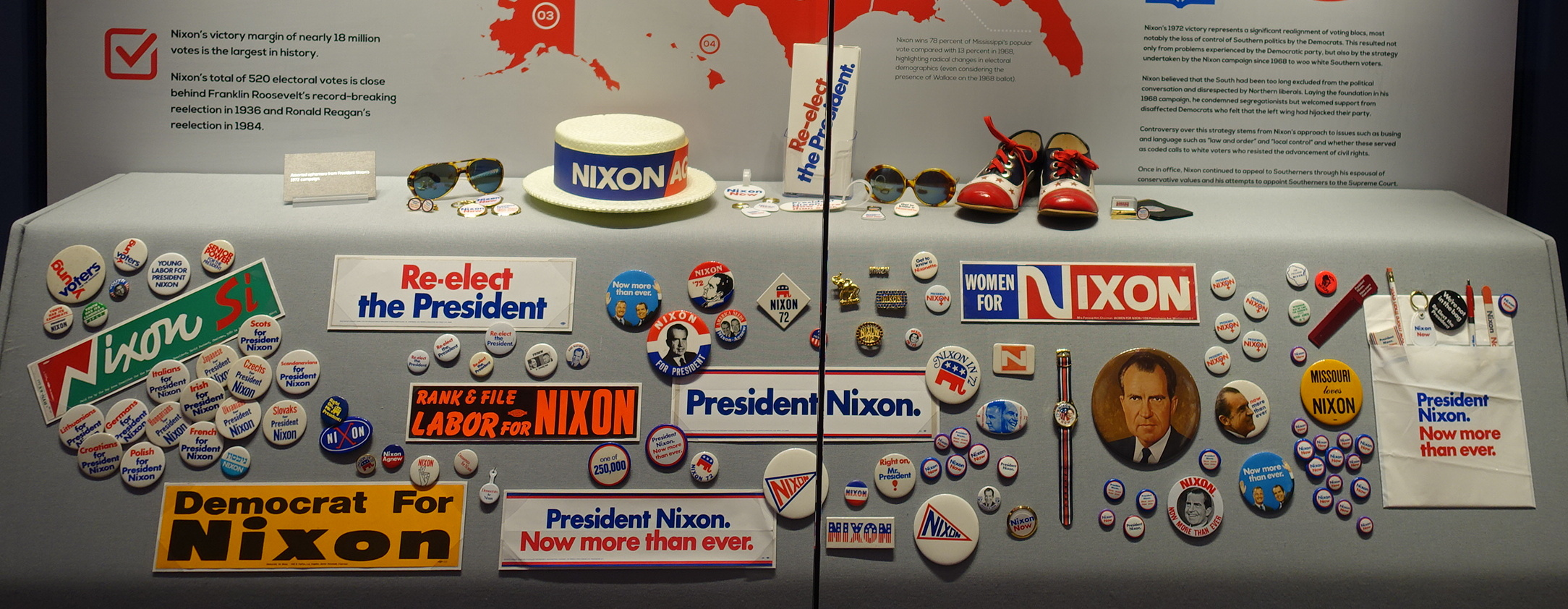
Nixon '72 memorabilia at the Nixon Presidential Library

Nixon authorized the formation of his 1972 campaign committee, Nixon-Agnew '72, on January 7, 1972. On August 23, he secured the nomination of the Republican Party at its convention in Miami Beach, Florida. The convention nominated Vice President Agnew as his running mate.

On November 7, Nixon carried 49 of 50 states, winning the election with 60.7 percent of the popular vote and 520 electoral votes. McGovern only carried Massachusetts and the District of Columbia, receiving 37.5 percent and 17 electoral votes. Nixon's re-election was confirmed by the Electoral College on December 18 and certified by the Joint session of Congress of January 6, 1973. He was inaugurated for his second term on January 20, 1973.

Both Agnew and Nixon resigned within two years of their second term. In December 1973, Gerald Ford replaced Agnew as vice president and in the following year, replaced Nixon as president. This made Nixon the first and, as of 2026, only person to be inaugurated four times as both president and vice president (only Franklin D. Roosevelt had four inaugurations, in his case for four terms).

== Chronicle ==
=== Republican National Convention ===
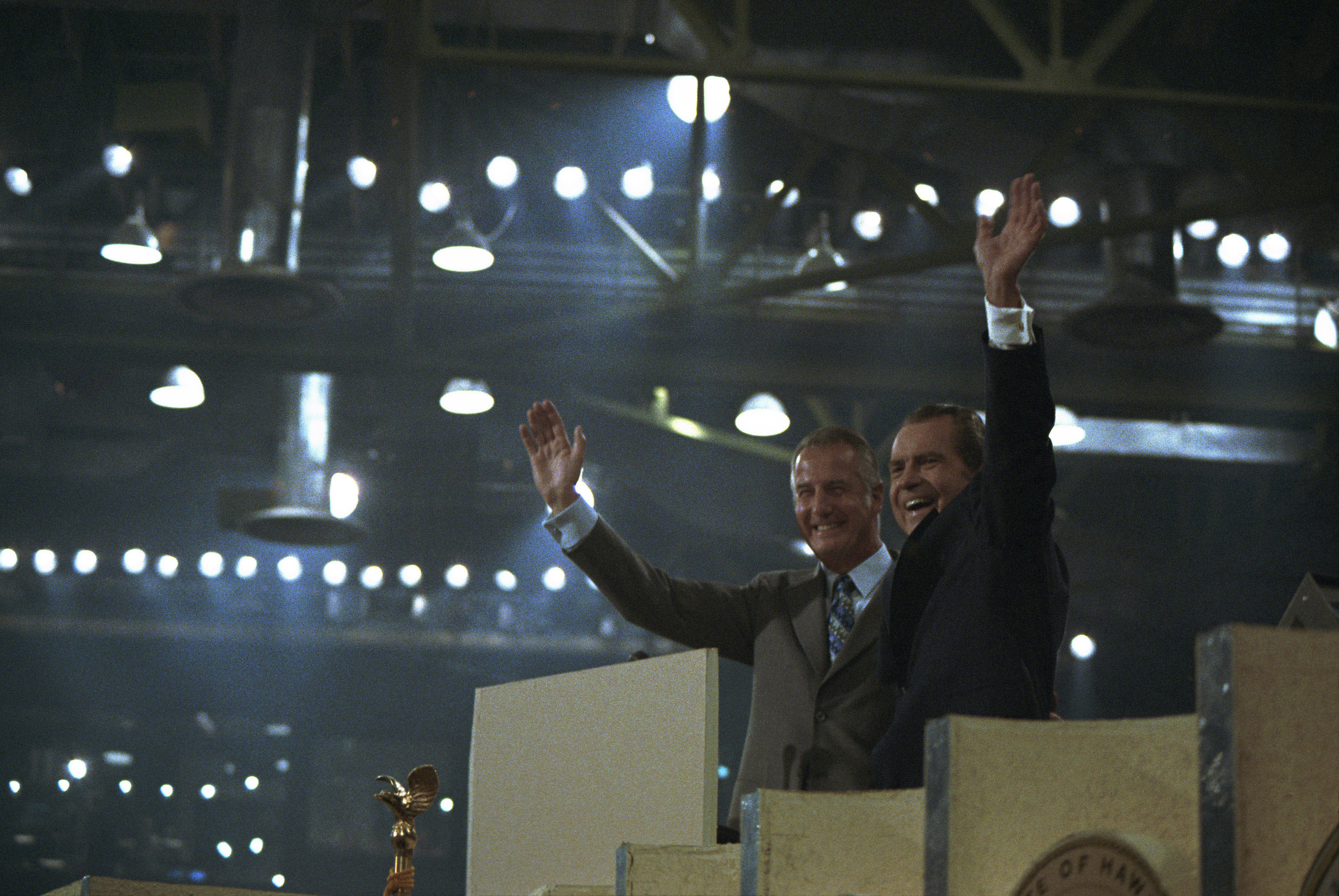
President Nixon and Vice President Agnew at the 1972 Republican National Convention at the Miami Beach Convention Center in Miami Beach, Florida

In August, Nixon accepted his party's nomination at the Republican National Convention at the Miami Beach Convention Center in Miami Beach, Florida.

==== Endorsements ====
List of Richard Nixon endorsements

Nixon had received endorsements from: Cabinet Members

- United States Deputy Secretary of Defense David Packard (1969–1971)
- United States Secretary of State William P. Rogers (1969–1973)

Senators

- Bob Dole (R-KS)
- Jacob Javits (R-NY)
- Charles H. Percy (R-IL)

Former Representatives

- William M. Tuck, (D-VA)

Governors

- William T. Cahill (R-NJ)
- Thomas Meskill (R-CT)
- Richard B. Ogilvie (R-IL)
- Ronald Reagan (R-CA)
- Nelson Rockefeller (R-NY)

Former Governors

- C. Farris Bryant, (D-FL)
- John Connally, (D-TX)
- Mills Godwin, (D-VA)
- Marvin Griffin, (D-GA)
- Allan Shivers, (D-TX)
- John Bell Williams, (D-MS)

TV and Radio Personalites

- Johnny Grant radio personality
- Merv Griffin TV personality
- Art Linkletter radio personality

Actors and Actresses

- June Allyson
- Richard Arlen
- Frankie Avalon
- Joan Blondell
- Ray Bolger
- Yvonne De Carlo
- Hoagy Carmichael
- Cyd Charisse
- Christopher Connelly (democrat)
- Robert Conrad
- Richard Crenna
- Arlene Dahl
- Sammy Davis Jr. (democrat)
- Dennis Day
- Don DeFore
- William Demarest
- Andy Devine
- Joanne Dru
- James Drury
- Irene Dunne
- Clint Eastwood
- Chad Everett
- Rhonda Fleming
- Glenn Ford (democrat)
- Zsa Zsa Gabor
- Virginia Grey
- George Hamilton (democrat)
- June Haver
- Charlton Heston (democrat)
- George Jessel
- Lainie Kazan
- Dorothy Lamour
- Fred MacMurray
- Gordon MacRae
- Virginia Mayo
- Ann Miller
- Mary Ann Mobley
- Mary Tyler Moore (democrat)
- Terry Moore, actress
- Lloyd Nolan
- Hugh O'Brian
- John Payne
- Walter Pidgeon
- Gene Raymond
- Debbie Reynolds
- Cesar Romero
- Julie Sommars
- James Stewart
- Hal Wallis
- John Wayne

Comedians

- Jack Benny
- Edgar Bergen
- George Burns
- Jimmy Durante (democrat)
- Bob Hope
- Dick Martin
- Ken Murray
- Dan Rowan
- Red Skelton

Singers

- James Brown (democrat)
- Pat Boone
- Glen Campbell (democrat)
- Eddie Fisher
- Hildegarde
- Tony Martin
- Frank Sinatra (democrat)
- Rudy Vallee

Musicians

- Les Brown saxophonists
- Sammy Kaye saxophonists

Basketball Players

- Wilt Chamberlain center

Football Players

- Jim Brown fullback (democrat)
- Nick Buoniconti linebacker
- Merlin Olsen defensive tackle
- Les Richter linebacker
- Gale Sayers running back
- O. J. Simpson running back
- Howard Twilley wide receiver

Motorsports

- Bobby Allison racing driver
- Gary Bettenhausen racing driver
- Frank DelRoy racing official
- A. J. Foyt racing driver
- Bill France Sr. racing executive (democrat)
- Don Garlits racing driver
- Jerry Grant racing driver
- James Hylton racing driver
- Bobby Isaac racing driver
- John Marcum racing executive
- David Pearson racing driver
- Richard Petty racing driver
- Ronnie Sox racing driver
- Ramo Stott racing driver
- Mickey Thompson racing driver
- Bobby Unser racing driver
- Bruce Walkup racing driver
- Rodger Ward racing driver
- Cale Yarborough racing driver
- LeeRoy Yarbrough racing driver

== See also ==
- 1972 Republican National Convention
- 1972 United States presidential election
- George McGovern 1972 presidential campaign
- Richard Nixon 1960 presidential campaign
- Richard Nixon 1968 presidential campaign
- Second inauguration of Richard Nixon

== Sources ==
- The 1972 Presidential Campaign: Nixon Administration - Mass Media Relationship. American Institute for Political Communication. 1974.
- White, T.H.; Roberts, C. (2010). The Making of the President, 1972. The Landmark Political Series. HarperCollins. ISBN 978-0-06-202711-5.
- Perlstein, Rick (April 15, 2011). "The Election of 1972". A Companion to Richard M. Nixon. Wiley. pp. 164–184. doi:10.1002/9781444340952.ch9. ISBN 978-1-4443-3017-5.
- Donahue, Bernard F. (1975). "The Political Use of Religions Symbols: A Case Study of the 1972 Presidential Campaign". The Review of Politics. 37 (1): 48–65. doi:10.1017/S0034670500025717. ISSN 0034-6705.
